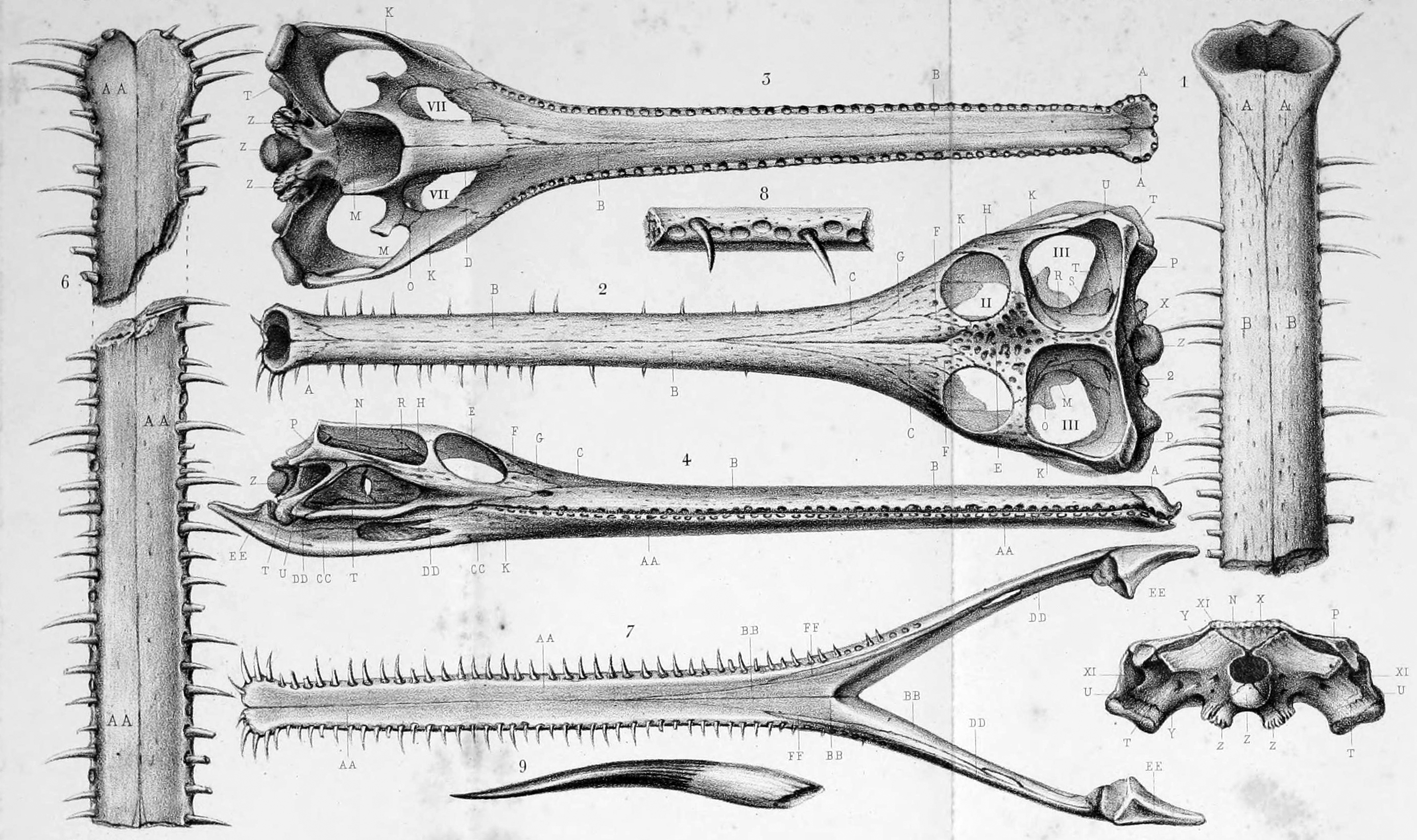
- Teleosaurus cadomensis

Scientific classification
- Kingdom: Animalia
- Phylum: Chordata
- Class: Reptilia
- Clade: Pseudosuchia
- Clade: Crocodylomorpha
- Suborder: †Thalattosuchia
- Parvorder: †Neothalattosuchia
- Superfamily: †Teleosauroidea; Geoffroy, 1831

Subgroups
- †Plagiophthalmosuchus?; †Machimosauridae; †Teleosauridae

= Teleosauroidea =

Teleosauroidea Temporal range: Early Jurassic-Early Cretaceous, 183–130 Ma

Extinct superfamily of reptiles

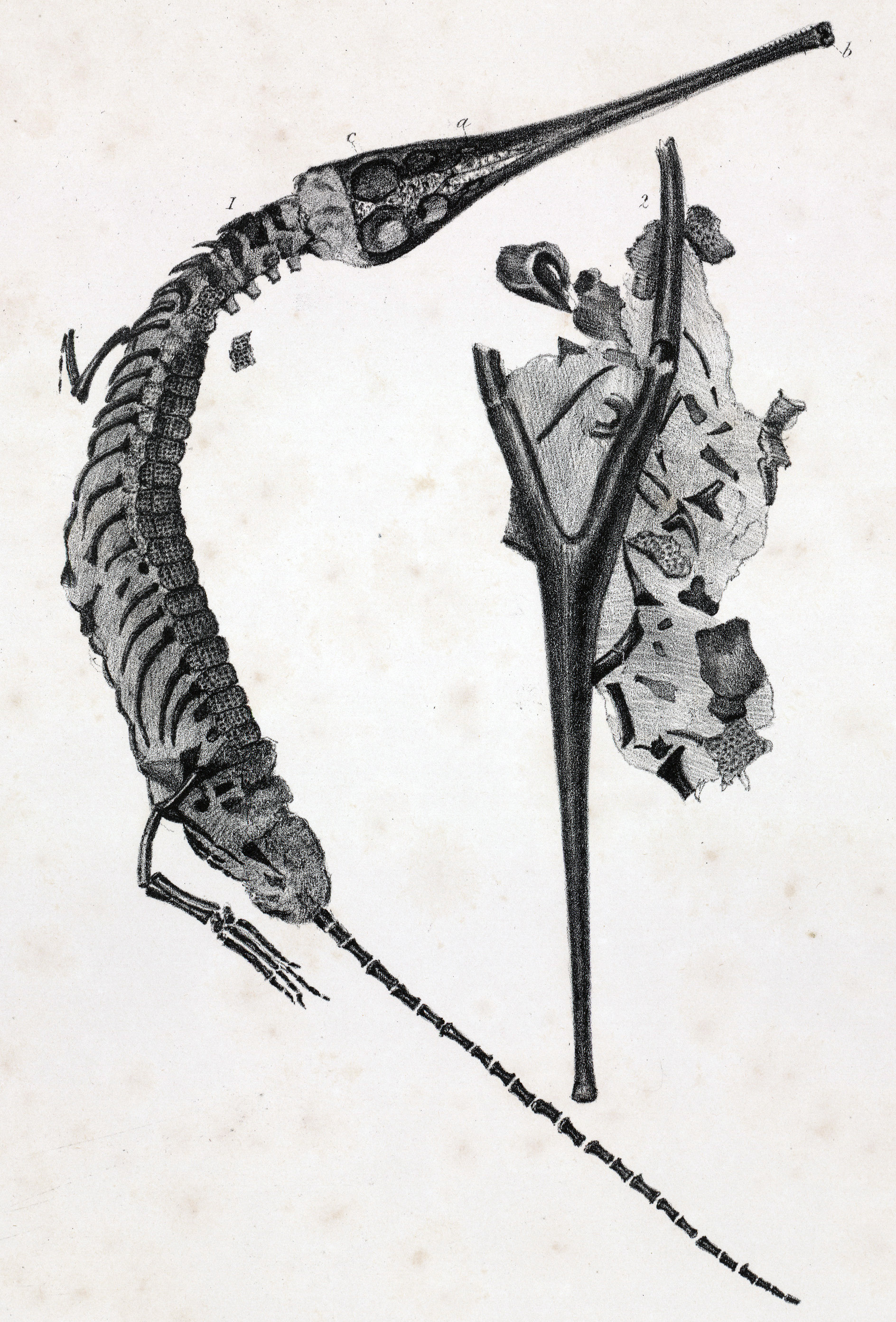
Plagiophthalmosuchus, a basal thalattosuchian sometimes placed the basal-most teleosauroid

Teleosauroidea is an extinct superfamily of thalattosuchian crocodyliforms living from the Early Jurassic to the Early Cretaceous. It is phylogenetically defined by Mark T. Young and colleagues in 2024 in the PhyloCode as "the largest clade within Thalattosuchia containing Teleosaurus cadomensis, but not Metriorhynchus brevirostris". This group contains two main families, the more piscivorous and gracile Teleosauridae and the more macropredatory and robust Machimosauridae.

== Phylogeny ==
The cladogram below is from a 2020 study by Michela Johnson and colleagues on the phylogenetic relationships of teleosauroids.

- Teleosauroidea
  - Plagiophthalmosuchus gracilirostris
  - - Teleosauridae
      - Indosinosuchus kalasinensis
      - - - Chinese teleosauroid (IVPP V 10098)
          - Mystriosaurus laurillardi
        - - Indosinosuchus potamosiamensis
          - - Teleosaurinae
              - Platysuchus multiscrobiculatus
              - Teleosaurus cadomensis
            - Aeolodontinae
              - Mycterosuchus nasutus
              - - Aeolodon priscus
                - - Sericodon jugleri
                  - Bathysuchus megarhinus
    - Machimosauridae
      - Macrospondylus bollensis
      - - Clovesuurdameredeor stephani
        - - Charitomenosuchus leedsi
          - - Seldsienean megistorhynchus
            - - Deslongchampsina larteti
              - Machimosaurinae
                - - Proexochokefalos cf. bouchardi
                  - Proexochokefalos heberti
                - - Neosteneosaurus edwardsi
                  - Andrianavoay baroni
                  - Machimosaurini
                    - Lemmysuchus obtusidens
                    - Yvridiosuchus boutilieri
                    - - Machimosaurus buffetauti
                      - - Machimosaurus mosae
                        - - Machimosaurus rex
                          - Machimosaurus hugii
