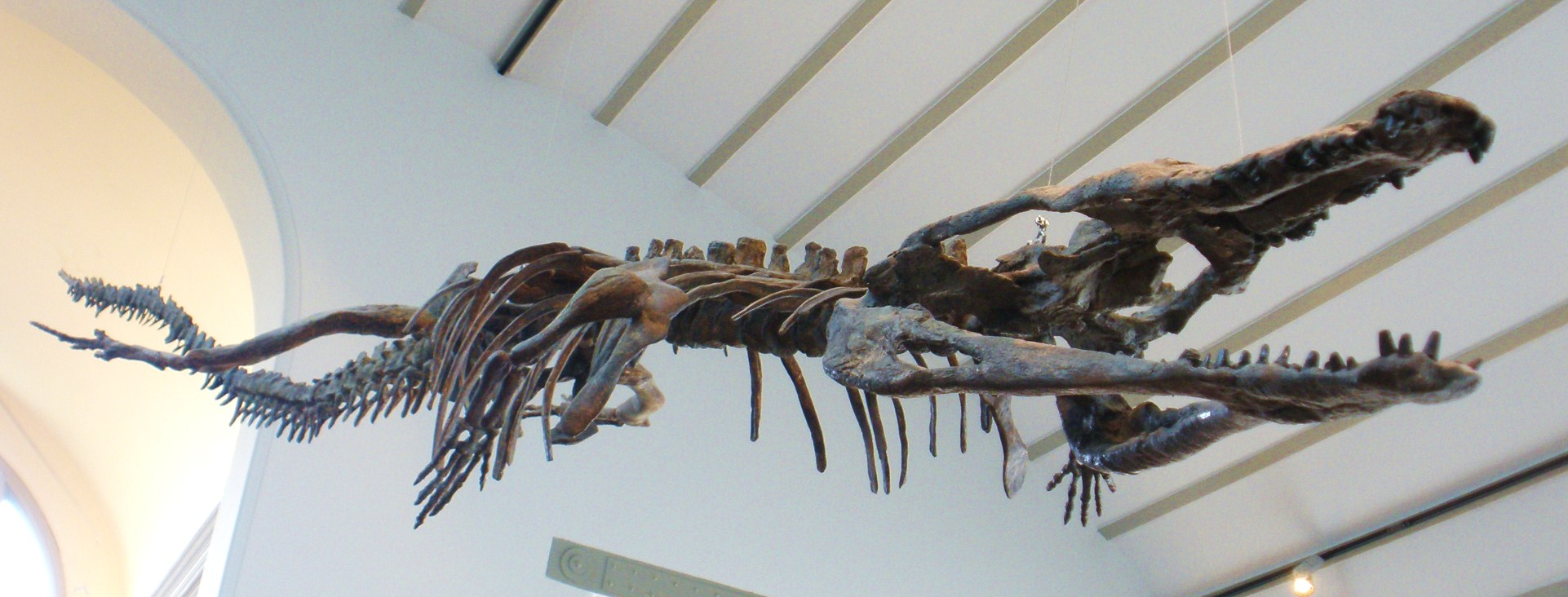
- Machimosaurus mosae cast

Scientific classification
- Kingdom: Animalia
- Phylum: Chordata
- Class: Reptilia
- Clade: Pseudosuchia
- Clade: Crocodylomorpha
- Suborder: †Thalattosuchia
- Family: †Machimosauridae
- Tribe: †Machimosaurini
- Genus: †Machimosaurus; Von Meyer, 1837

Species
- †M. hugii type Von Meyer (1837); †M. mosae Sauvage and Lienard 1879; †M. nowackianus (von Huene. 1938); †M. buffetauti Young et al., 2015; †M. rex Fanti et al., 2016

Synonyms
- Machinosaurus; Madrimosaurus hugii (sic)

= Machimosaurus =

Machimosaurus Temporal range: 154–130 Ma Kimmeridgian - Hauterivian?

Genus of reptiles

Machimosaurus is an extinct genus of machimosaurid crocodyliform from the Late Jurassic (Kimmeridgian and Tithonian). Although a new species was presented from the Early Cretaceous, this was subsequently contested and the genus might instead be restricted to the Late Jurassic. The type species, Machimosaurus hugii, was found in Switzerland. Other fossils have been found in England, France, Germany, Portugal, Switzerland and Tunisia. Machimosaurus rex is the largest named teleosauroid and thalattosuchian, with an estimated length of up to 7.15 m (23.5 ft) (skull length 155 cm (61 in)). Machimosaurus is the largest known crocodyliform of the Jurassic.

== Discovery and species ==
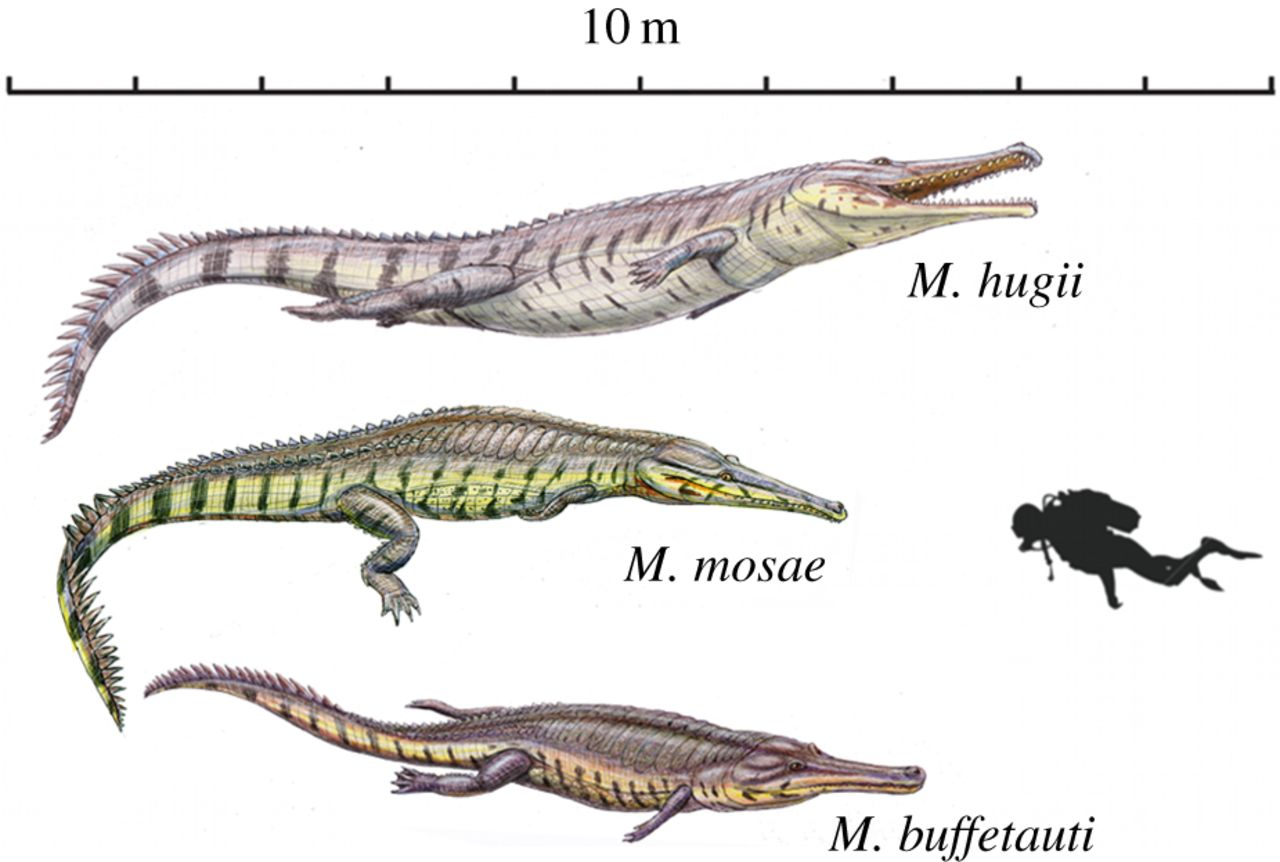
Illustrations of the three European species

Christian Erich Hermann von Meyer in 1837 named isolated conical, blunt teeth with numerous longitudinal lines from Switzerland, Madrimosaurus hugii. However, in 1838, realising he had misspelled the name, he emended Madrimosaurus to Machimosaurus, from the Greek machimoi, ancient Egyptian troops deployed during the Ptolemaic Dynasty plus the -saurus suffix, literally meaning "pugnacious lizard". The teeth of Machimosaurus, with their rounded, blunt apex and stout morphology make them characteristic and easily identifiable compared to other teleosaurid teeth.

The type species, M. hugii, is known from the Kimmeridgian of Portugal, Spain, Tunisia and Switzerland. Machimosaurus ferox and M. interruptus were previously considered junior synonyms of M. hugii, but have been recently considered possible synonyms of Machimosaurus mosae.

Krebs (1967), considered M. mosae (Lienard, 1876) to be a junior synonym of M. hugii, but is considered a second valid species of the genus based on a nearly complete skeleton found from the late Kimmeridgian of France.

Two species also placed within Machimosaurus are M. bathonicus and M. rigauxi, from the Bathonian of France. However, these are gracile species, lacking the characteristic blunted teeth of Machimosaurus, and are probably referable to Steneosaurus.

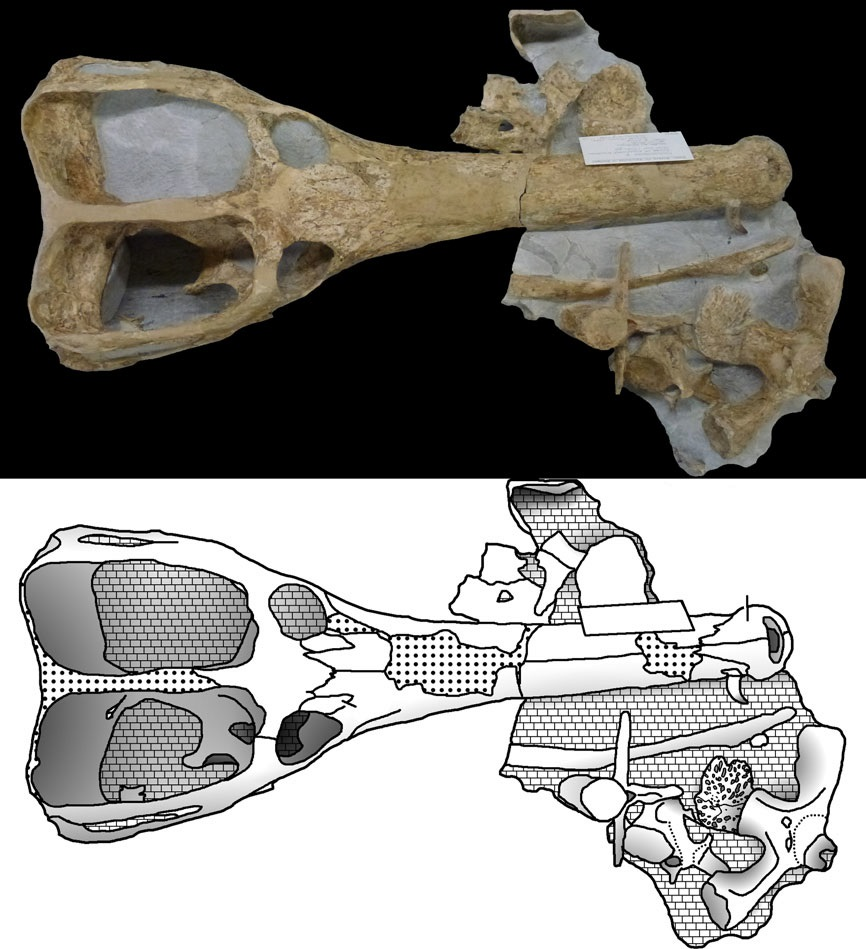
Skull

Mark Young and his colleagues made a detailed revision of the genus and recognized four species: M. hugii, M. mosae, M. nowackianus from Harrar, Ethiopia, and a new species, Machimosaurus buffetauti. They hypothesized that Machimosaurus may have been analogous to the Pliocene–Holocene genus Crocodylus in having one large-bodied taxon suited to traversing marine barriers and additional, geographically limited taxa across its range.

The fossilized anterior portion of the lower jaw from the Late Jurassic (Oxfordian or Kimmeridgian) of Ethiopia referred to the pliosaur Simolestes nowackianus, is in fact a large species of Machimosaurus.

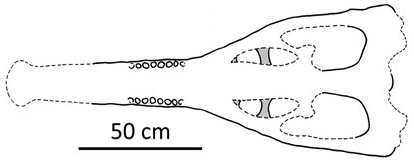
Diagram of the skull of M. rex in palatal view

In 2016, a new species of Machimosaurus from the Douiret Formation in Tunisia was described in the journal Cretaceous Research. Named Machimosaurus rex, it was the largest teleosauroid known at the time, estimated to be 9.6 m (31.5 ft) in length (skull length 155 cm (61 in)) based on a partial skeleton. M. rex was also the youngest teleosauroid known at the time. However, more recent estimates put M. hugii along with M. rex at about 6.9–7.15 m (22.6–23.5 ft) long. The discovery of M. rex indicates that teleosauroid crocodylomorphs survived the extinction event at the end of the Late Jurassic, but did not retain the biodiversity seen in the Jurassic. However, this conclusion is challenged by the poor stratigraphic constraint of the specimen. In addition, the taxonomic validity of M. rex is open to debate. Moreover, an incomplete specimen from the Barremian of Colombia attributed to Teleosauroidea is not only the youngest known teleosauroid, but also the largest at about 9.6 m (31.5 ft) long. Ichnofossils of a gigantic Crocodylomorph from Spain may belong to Machimosaurus,but the taxonomic attribution is uncertain.

== Classification ==
The genus Machimosaurus is considered monospecific with M. hugii as the sole and unique representative.

The phylogenetic relationships of the Machimosauridae were analyzed in a comprehensive analysis of teleosauroid relationships. The results of the analysis are shown below:

- Machimosauridae
  - Macrospondylus bollensis
  - - Clovesuurdameredeor stephani
    - - Charitomenosuchus leedsi
      - - Seldsienean megistorhynchus
        - - Deslongchampsina larteti
          - Machimosaurinae
            - - Proexochokefalos hebertii
              - cf. Proexochokefalos bouchardi
            - - Neosteneosaurus edwardsi
              - Andrianavoay baroni
              - Machimosaurini
                - Lemmysuchus obtusidens
                - Yvridiosuchus boutilieri
                - - Machimosaurus buffetauti
                  - - Machimosaurus mosae
                    - - Machimosaurus rex
                      - Machimosaurus hugii

== Palaeobiology ==
=== Niche partitioning ===
From the Kimmeridgian-age, semi-aquatic deposits of Oker, Lower Saxony, Germany two genera of teleosaurids (Steneosaurus and Machimosaurus) are known, in addition to the neosuchian genera Goniopholis and Theriosuchus. Machimosaurus and Steneosaurus are also found together in the same Tithonian-age deposits of western France.

=== Diet ===
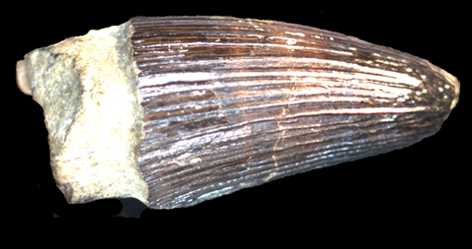
Tooth

Bite marks on an early Kimmeridgian sauropod (Amanzia) femur from Switzerland match teeth known from Machimosaurus hugii, also found in the same deposits. This suggests either scavenging on the sauropod's corpse, or active predation from the waters edge, much like living crocodilians. Kimmeridgian-age fossil turtles from "Solothurn Turtle Limestone" of northern Switzerland have bite marks, and splintered Machimosaurus teeth imbedded, while fossil turtles from the Late Jurassic of Germany also possess bite marks that match teeth of Machimosaurus found in the same deposit.

Morphofunctional analysis on the skull of Machimosaurus strongly suggests they ate turtles (chelonophagy). Morphological comparison of their teeth also confirms that they are adapted to seizing and crushing hard prey.

=== Locomotion ===
Based on the vertebrae (zygapophysial) articulations, Machimosaurus is considered to have lived in open-seas, swimming by lateral undulations of the tail with the limbs used for steering and balancing. Head and neck depressing (downward moving) muscles would have been well-developed, as their attachment site on the skull (basioccipital tubera) were large. This would have greatly assisted Machimosaurus in diving.

== See also ==
- List of marine reptiles
