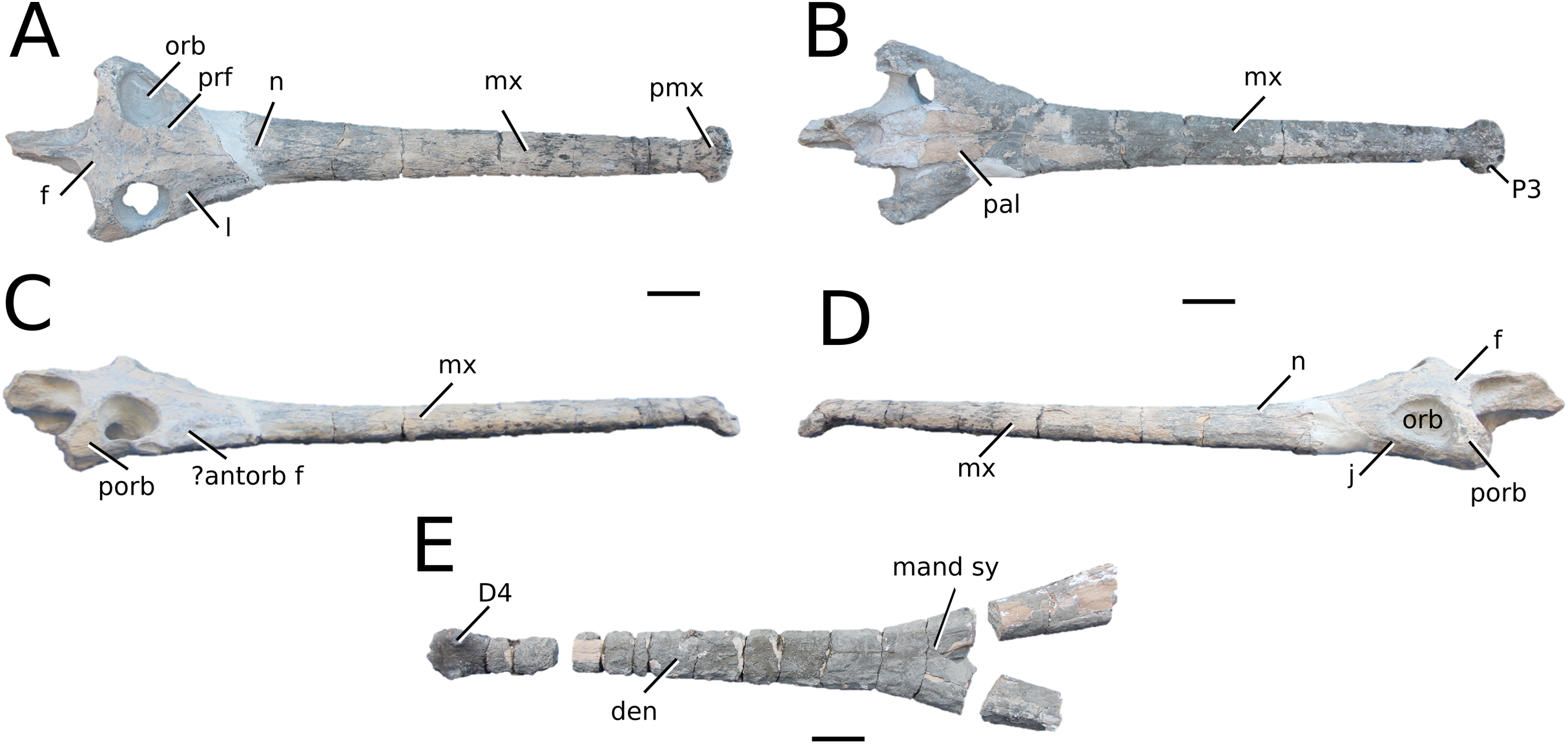
- Holotype skull

Scientific classification
- Kingdom: Animalia
- Phylum: Chordata
- Class: Reptilia
- Clade: Pseudosuchia
- Clade: Crocodylomorpha
- Suborder: †Thalattosuchia
- Family: †Machimosauridae
- Genus: †Seldsienean; Johnson et al., 2020
- Species: †S. megistorhynchus

Binomial name
- †Seldsienean megistorhynchus (Eudes-Deslongchamps, 1866)

Synonyms
- Steneosaurus megistorhynchus Eudes-Deslongchamps, 1866

= Seldsienean =

Seldsienean Temporal range: Middle Jurassic, Bathonian

Extinct genus of machimosaurid thalattosuchian

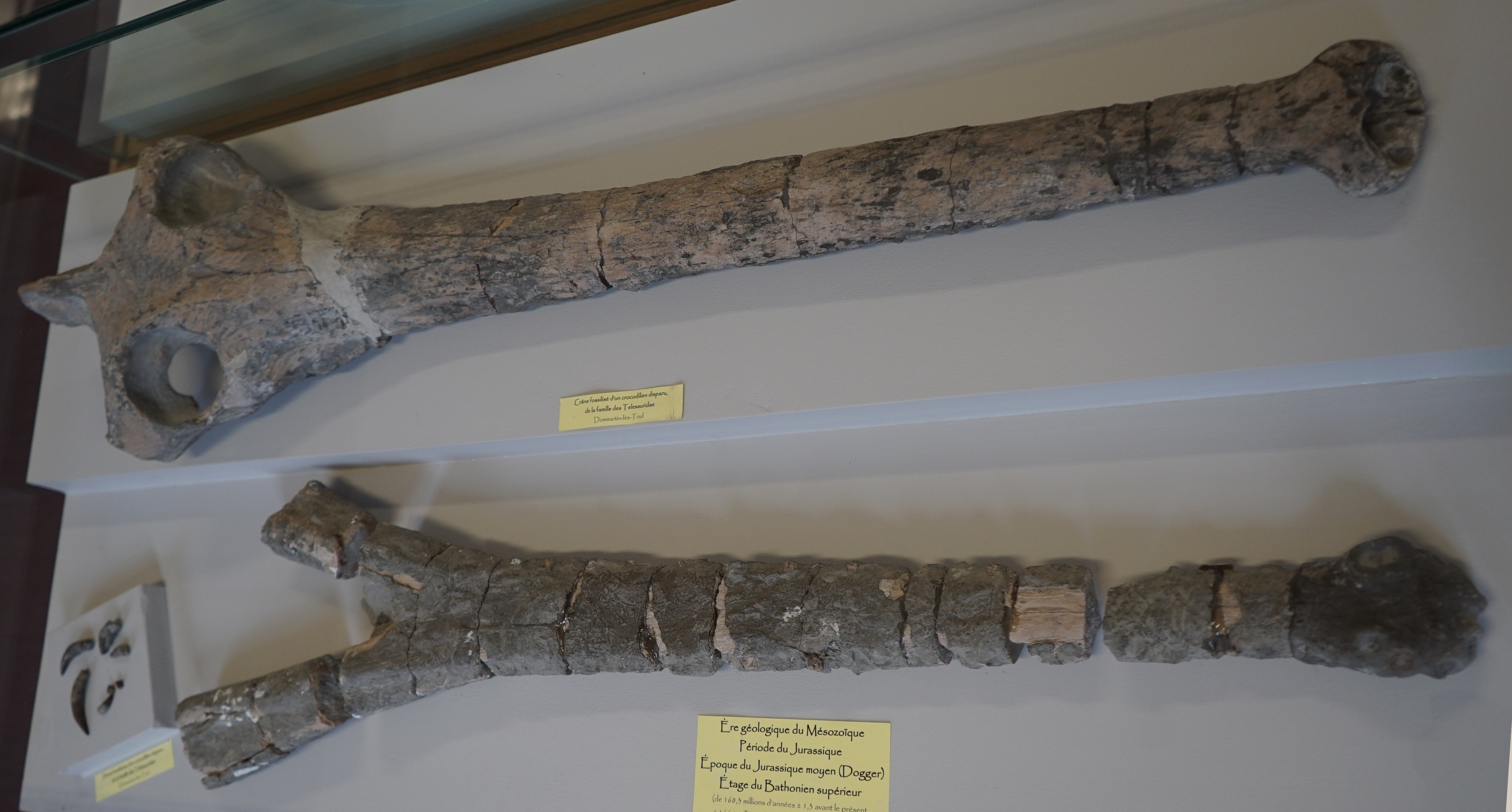
Alternative view of the holotype

Seldsienean is an extinct genus of teleosauroid thalattosuchian from the Middle Jurassic of England and France. The only known species, S. megistorhynchus, is known from remains from the Calcaire de Caen and the Cornbrash Formation. In life, Seldsienean was a marine reptile that would have fed mostly on fish and other small animals.

== Taxonomy ==
The type species, S. megistorhynchus, was originally named as a species Steneosaurus in 1866. The genus Steneosaurus was used as a longtime wastebasket taxon for various teleosauroid specimens and had more than a dozen species. The type species, Steneosaurus rostromajor is undiagnostic, making the genus and species dubious and invalid. Additionally, many species of so-called "Steneosaurus" were found to be quite different and unrelated to one another, thus needing new generic names.

In 2020, Michela Johnson and colleagues reassigned "Steneosaurus" megistorhynchus to the new genus Seldsienean, resulting in the new combination Seldsienean megistorhynchus. The generic name is derived from Old English and translates to "seldom seen one" in reference to its fossils being rarer compared to other Bathonian teleosauroids.

== Classification ==
Seldsienean was initially recovered as a basal member of Machimosauridae, a family of large-bodied, marine-adapted reptiles. Members of this group are characterized by robust skulls, powerful jaws, and heavily built bodies, adaptations that positioned them among the apex predators within their respective marine ecosystems. The cladogram below is from the 2020 analysis by Johnson and colleagues.

- Machimosauridae
  - Macrospondylus bollensis
  - - Clovesuurdameredeor stephani
    - - Charitomenosuchus leedsi
      - - Seldsienean megistorhynchus
        - - Deslongchampsina larteti
          - Machimosaurinae
            - - Proexochokefalos hebertii
              - cf. Proexochokefalos bouchardi
            - - Neosteneosaurus edwardsi
              - Andrianavoay baroni
              - Machimosaurini
                - Lemmysuchus obtusidens
                - Yvridiosuchus boutilieri
                - - Machimosaurus buffetauti
                  - - Machimosaurus mosae
                    - - Machimosaurus rex
                      - Machimosaurus hugii

A later study in 2024 by Mark Young and colleagues found Seldsienean to be part of a different teleosauroid group called Teleosauridae. It was found to be most closely related to the subgroup Aeolodontini.

- Teleosauroidea
  - Machimosauridae
  - Teleosauridae
    - - Mystriosaurus laurillardi
      - - Indosinosuchus potamosiamensis
        - Chinese teleosauroid (IVPP V 10098)
    - - Teleosaurinae
        - Platysuchus multiscrobiculatus
        - Teleosaurus cadomensis
      - - Seldsienean megistorhynchus
        - Aeolodontini
          - Mycterosuchus nasutus
          - - Aeolodon priscus
            - - Sericodon jugleri
              - Bathysuchus megarhinus

Young et al., 2024 also submitted a proposal to the International Commission on Zoological Nomenclature to designate Seldsienean megistorhynchus as the new type species for Steneosaurus and to adopt this revised type species as the basis for defining the family Steneosauridae. However, as of 2025 this issue is not fully resolved and Seldsienean remains valid.

== Ecology ==
Based on its jaw morphology, Seldsienean is thought to have been a longirostrine generalist. It possessed long thin jaws that had a fast but relatively weak bite. These adaptations point to a lifestyle of catching and eating fish and other smaller marine animals.
