= Calcaire de Caen =

Geological formation in France

- Stratigraphic range: Middle Bathonian; ~168–166 Ma
- Type: Geological formation
- Sub-units: Banc Royal & Pierre de Caen Members
- Underlies: Calcaire de Rouvres/Calcaire de Creully
- Overlies: Marnes de Port en Bessin
- Thickness: ~22 m (72 ft)

Lithology
- Primary: Limestone

Location
- Coordinates: 49.4°N 0.4°E
- Approximate paleocoordinates: 39.2°N 10.7°E
- Region: Normandy
- Country: France
- Extent: Paris Basin

Type section
- Named for: Caen
- Calcaire de Caen (France) Calcaire de Caen (Normandy)

The Calcaire de Caen or Calcaires de Caen Formation; French for Caen Limestone, is a geological formation in France. It is dated to the mid-Bathonian of the Jurassic period. It was frequently quarried for building work and is referred to as Caen Stone.

== Fossil content ==
Color key: Taxon / Reclassified taxon / Taxon falsely reported as present / Dubious taxon or junior synonym / Ichnotaxon / Ootaxon / Morphotaxon	Notes; Uncertain or tentative taxa are in small text; ~~crossed out~~ taxa are discredited.

=== Dinosaurs ===
==== Ornithischians ====
Ornithischians of the Calcaire de Caen
Genus	Species	Location	Stratigraphic position	Material	Notes	Image
Lexovisaurus	L. durobrivensis	Département Du Calvados, France	Bathonian		A stegosaur	

==== Sauropods ====
Sauropods of the Calcaire de Caen
Genus	Species	Location	Stratigraphic position	Material	Notes	Image
Sauropoda Indet.	Indeterminate	Département Du Calvados, France	Bathonian		An indeterminate sauropod.	

==== Theropods ====
Theropods of the Calcaire de Caen
Genus	Species	Location	Stratigraphic position	Material	Notes	Image
Dubreuillosaurus	D. valesdunensis	Département Du Calvados, France	Bathonian	Nearly complete skull and partial skeleton.	A afrovenatorine megalosaurid	
Poekilopleuron	P. bucklandii	Département Du Calvados, France	Bathonian	Partial postcranial skeleton.	A carnosaurian theropod	

=== Thalattosuchians ===
Thalattosuchians of the Calcaire de Caen
Genus	Species	Location	Stratigraphic position	Material	Notes	Image
Deslongchampsina	D. larteti	Département Du Calvados, France	Bathonian		A machimosaurid thalattosuchian	
Proexochokefalos	P. cf. bouchardi	Département Du Calvados, France	Bathonian		A machimosaurine machimosaurid	
Seldsienean	S. megistorhynchus	Département Du Calvados, France	Bathonian		A machimosaurid thalattosuchian	
Teleosaurus	T. cadomensis	Département Du Calvados, France	Bathonian	Quarter of a skull and other assorted fragments.	A teleosaurine teleosaurid	
Teleosaurus	T. geoffroyi (?)	Département Du Calvados, France	Bathonian	Quarter of a skull and other assorted fragments.	A teleosaurine teleosaurid	
Yvridiosuchus	Y. boutilieri	Département Du Calvados, France	Bathonian		A machimosaurin machimosaurine	

=== Plesiosaurs ===
Plesiosaurs of the Calcaire de Caen
Genus	Species	Location	Stratigraphic position	Material	Notes	Image
Plesiosauria Indet.	Indeterminate	Département Du Calvados, France	Bathonian		An indeterminate plesiosaur	

=== Fish ===
==== Cartilaginous Fish ====
Cartilaginous Fish of the Calcaire de Caen
Genus	Species	Location	Stratigraphic position	Material	Notes	Image
Strophodus	S. longidens	Département Du Calvados, France	Bathonian		A hybodont	
Strophodus	S. magnus	Département Du Calvados, France	Bathonian		A hybodont	
Strophodus	S. medius	Département Du Calvados, France	Bathonian		A hybodont	
Strophodus	S. reticulatus	Département Du Calvados, France	Bathonian		A hybodont	

== See also ==
- List of dinosaur-bearing rock formations
