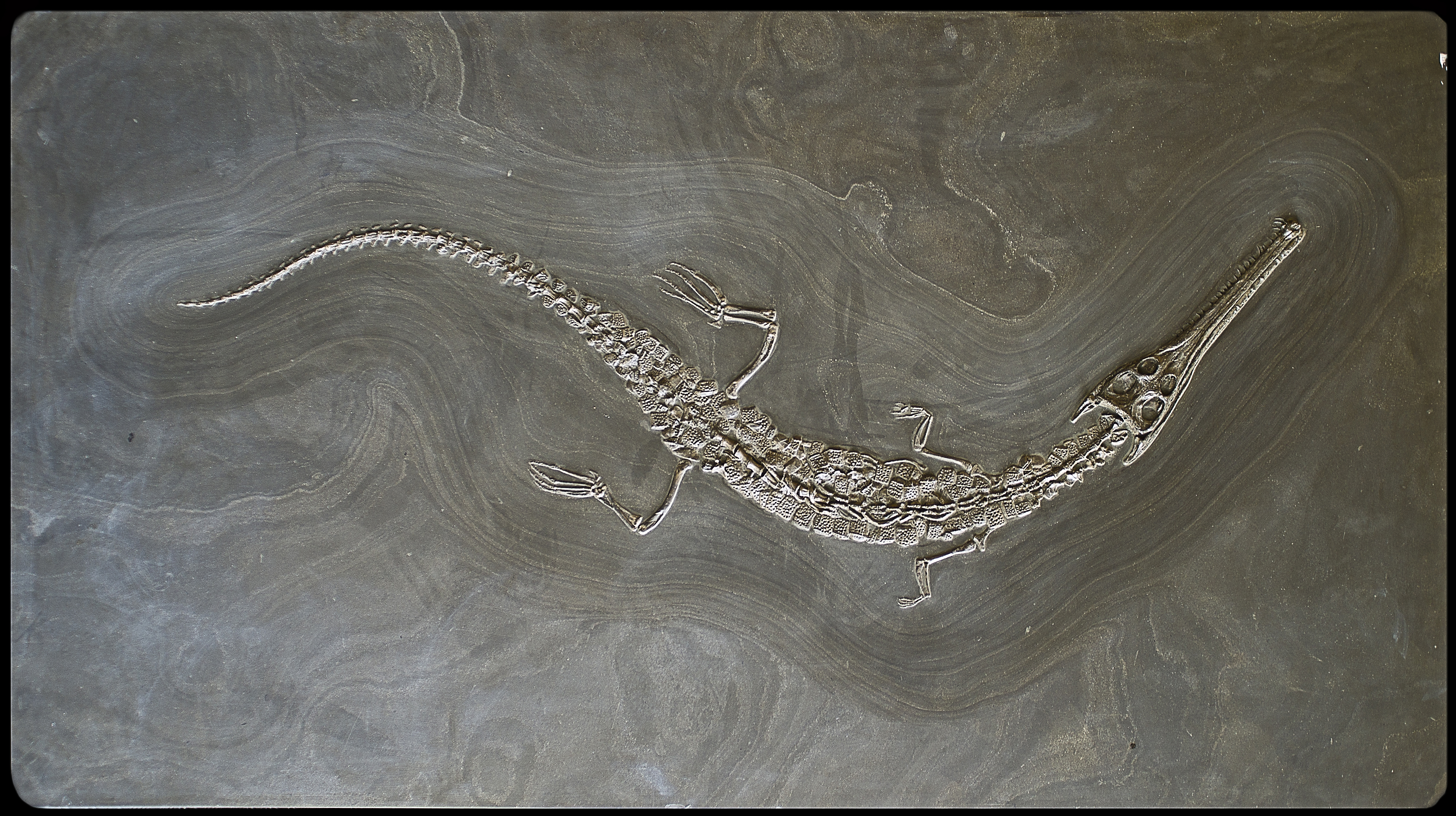
- Macrospondylus bollensis, Holzmaden Germany

Scientific classification
- Kingdom: Animalia
- Phylum: Chordata
- Class: Reptilia
- Clade: Pseudosuchia
- Clade: Crocodylomorpha
- Suborder: †Thalattosuchia
- Superfamily: †Teleosauroidea
- Family: †Machimosauridae
- Genus: †Macrospondylus von Meyer, 1831
- Species: †M. bollensis

Binomial name
- †Macrospondylus bollensis Jäger, 1828

Synonyms
- Crocodilus bollensis (Jäger, 1828); Teleosaurus mandelsohi Bronn, 1841; Steneosaurus bollensis (Cuvier, 1824)

= Macrospondylus =

Macrospondylus Temporal range: Toarcian 183–180 Ma

Extinct genus of reptiles

Macrospondylus is an extinct genus of thalattosuchian crocodylomorph from the Early Jurassic (Toarcian) of Europe. It was a large ocean-going reptile, being the largest known crocodylomorph from the Early Jurassic. Fossils have been found in the Posidonia Shale of Germany, the Whitby Mudstone of the United Kingdom, and the Schistes bitemineux of Luxembourg. The type and only species known is Macrospondylus bollensis and it is one of the best known early thalattosuchians, being known from hundreds of specimens, including complete skeletons.

== Discovery and history ==
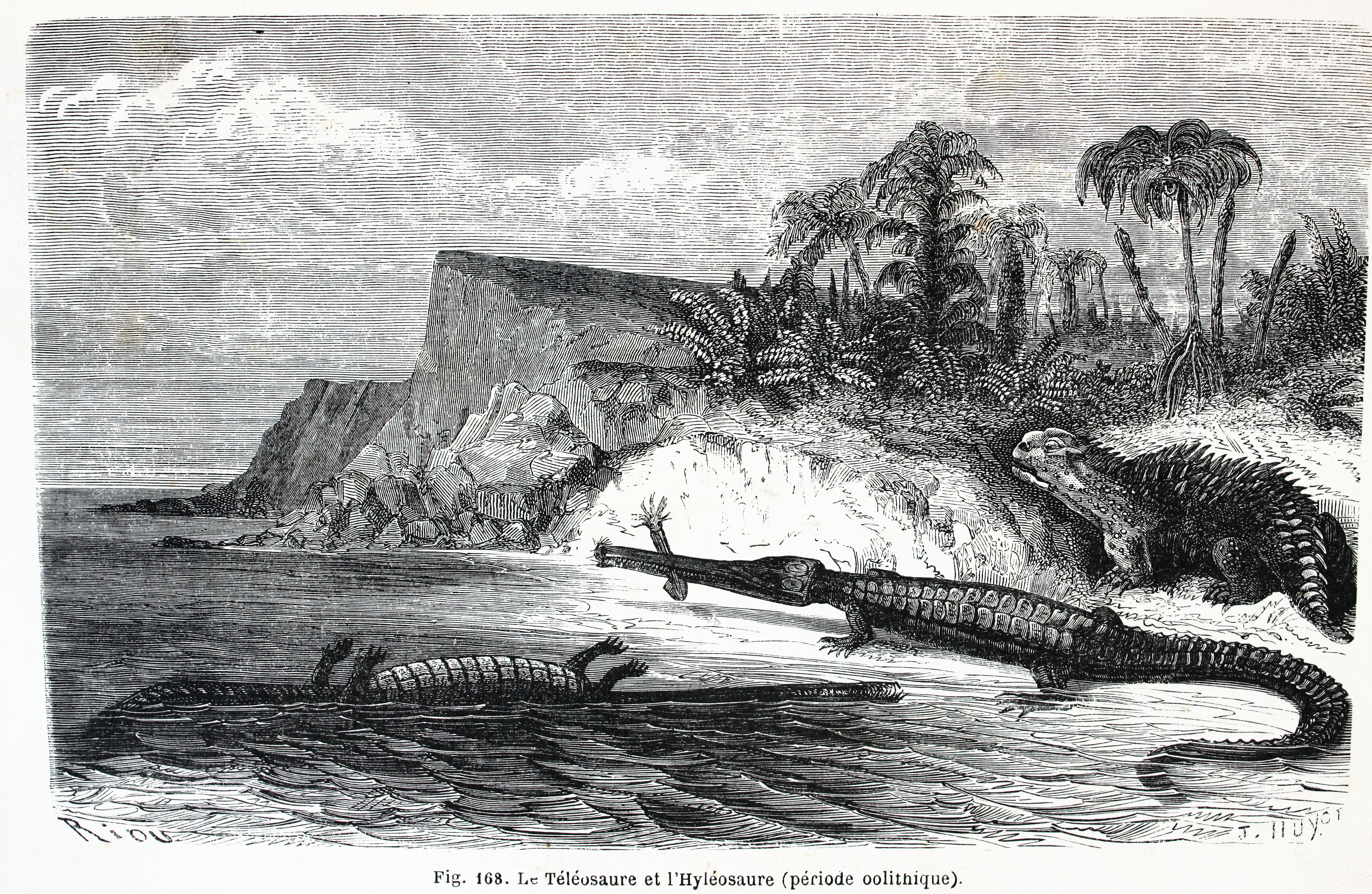
1863 reconstruction of a "teleosaur", showing them as coastal gharial-like predators

The holotype of Macrospondylus bollensis (the "Dresden specimen", MMG BwJ 595) was originally acquired in the early 1700s by Johann Georg Gmelin in Boll, a village in the Duchy of Württemberg. He donated it to the Königlichen Naturhistorischen Museum where it became a part of its collection. Several scholars mentioned the specimen over the years: in 1782 it was described as a crocodile skeleton from Boll in Württemberg, and later noted again for its size and origin. In 1814, however, Samuel Thomas von Sömmerring questioned whether it was really a crocodile, suggesting it might be a monitor lizard instead, since the fossil was too poorly preserved to identify with certainty. In 1824, renowned French naturalist Georges Cuvier provided more evidence that the Dresden specimen was indeed a type of crocodile and suggested that both it and the Mörnsheim specimen (specimen NHMUK PV R 1086, now belonging to the species Aeolodon priscus) represented the same species.

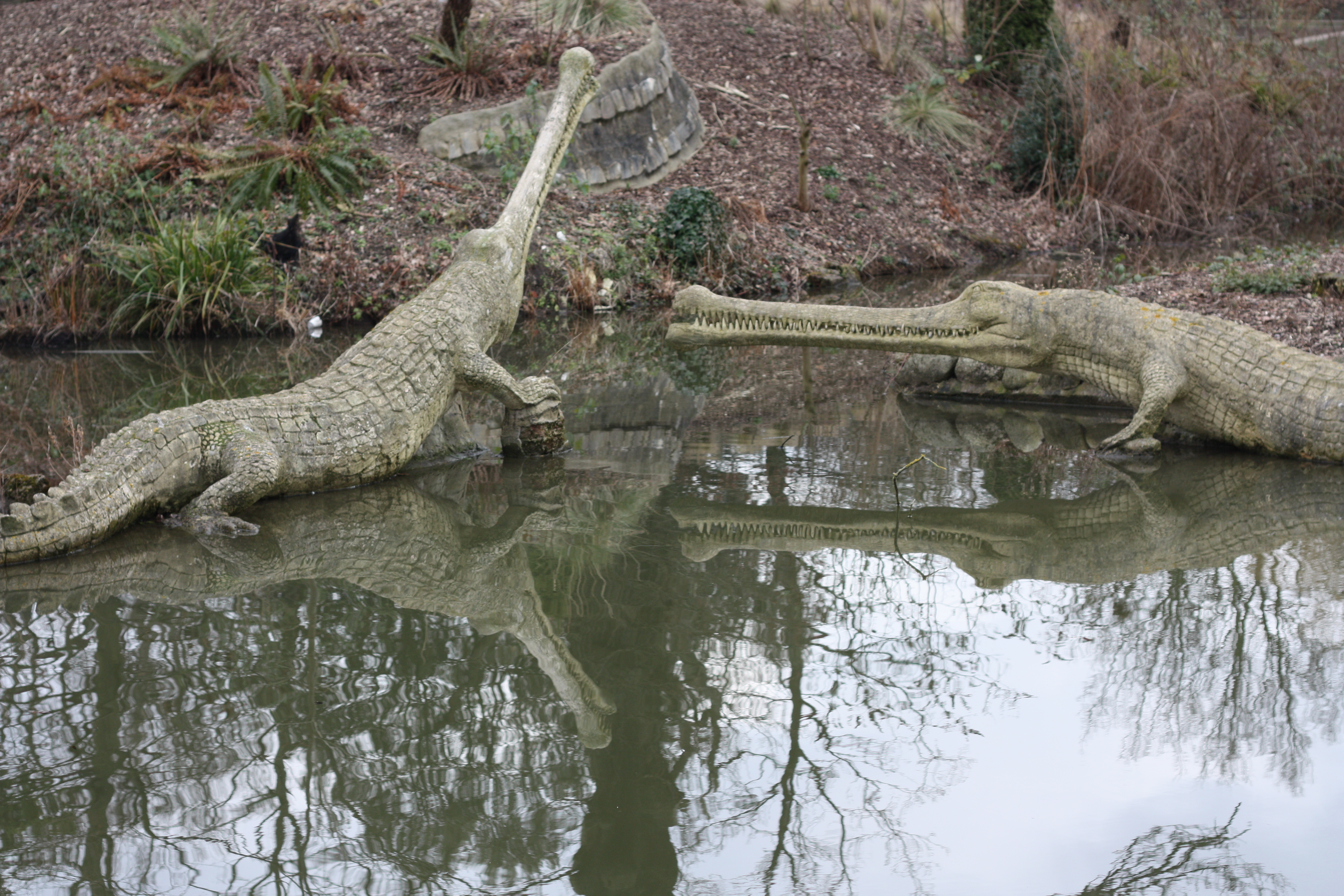
The "Teleosaurus" models in Crystal Palace Park were based on Macrospondylus fossils

The specimen was formally given a name in 1828 by German physician Georg Friedrich von Jäger as Crocodilus bollensis, determining it to be a unique species and distinct from the Mörnsheim specimen. In the 1830's, Christian Erich Hermann von Meyer further distinguished the two, pointing out numerous differences in their vertebrae and limbs and the fact that they were from two different stratigraphic layers, meaning they didn't live at the same time (Macrospondylus from the Early Jurassic and Aeolodon from the Late Jurassic). Thus, von Meyer created the new genus name Macrospondylus for C. bollensis, resulting in the new combination Macrospondylus bollensis.

In the following decades, the growing number of specimens led to many studies exploring the biology and true identity of Macrospondylus. It was recognized to be a teleosauroid, a group of marine-adapted crocodylomorphs that were common in the Jurassic. In that time, M. bollensis was also sometimes assigned to be a species of relatives such as Teleosaurus and Mystriosaurus. In the 1960s, Klaus Westphal assigned M. bollensis as a species of Steneosaurus, a wastebasket taxon for various teleosauroid species, having over a dozen species at its height. The species combination Steneosaurus bollensis would remain unchanged only until relatively recently.

This change would occur only in 2020, when the genus Macrospondylus was formally revived by Michela Johnson and colleagues in a study detailing the phylogenetics of teleosauroids. They determined Steneosaurus to be a dubious genus and reassigned many species of so-called "Steneosaurus" to various new genera. They also assigned Macrospondylus to the family Machimosauridae.

== Description ==
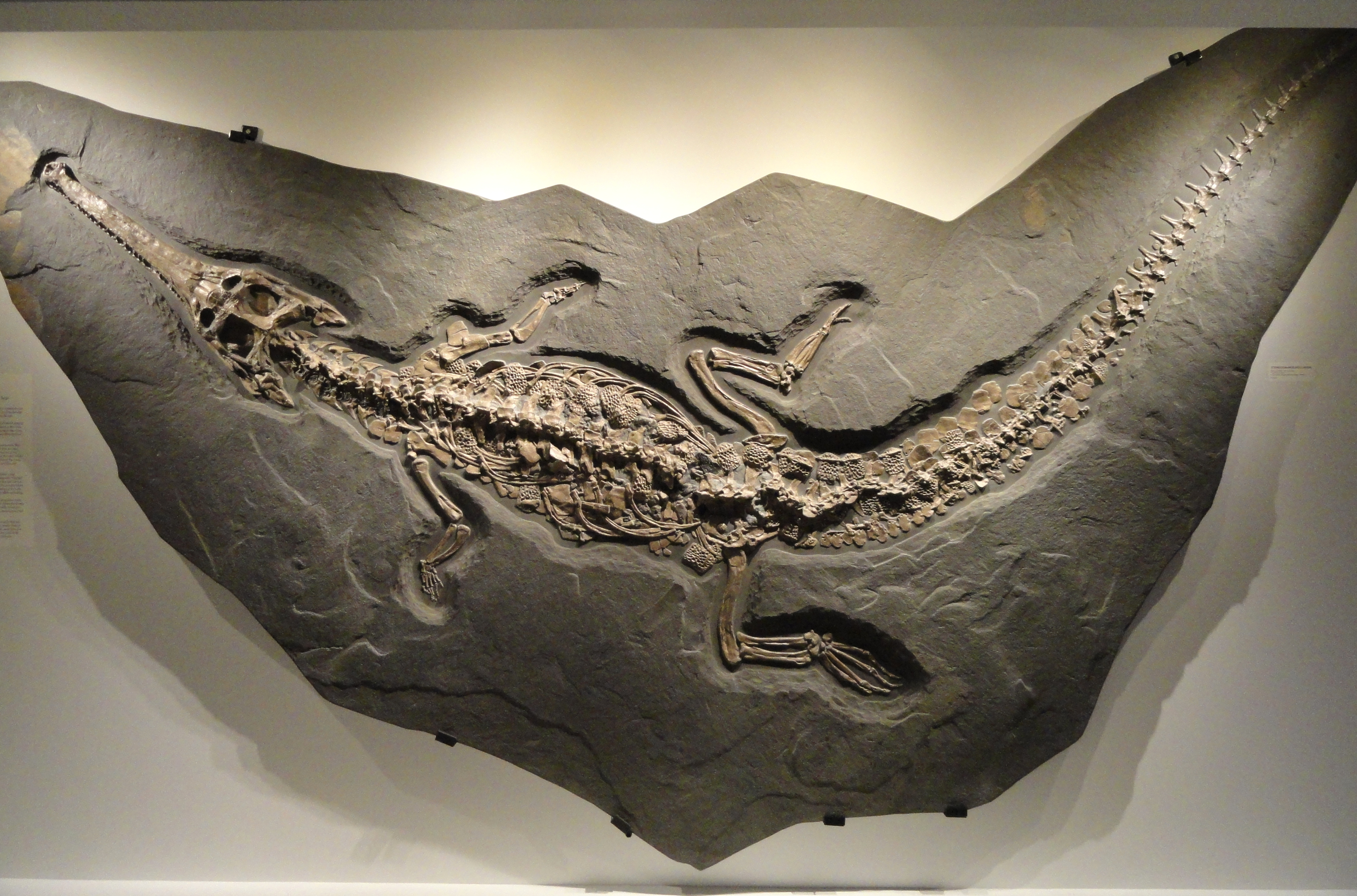
Fossil display at the Houston Museum of Natural Science

Macrospondylus was quite a large animal, with body length estimated at 5.5 meters (18 ft). It superficially resembled modern gharials, possessing a large streamlined skull with robust and serrated teeth. Additionally, it also possessed relatively smaller limbs, osteoderms, and a large tail for swimming. In adult Macrospondylus, the forelimbs were much smaller than the hindlimbs (about 43% shorter), pointing to reduced ability of walking on land and a lifestyle more suited to water. However, the presence of small, well-developed, and ornamented osteoderms, features that likely helped with buoyancy and temperature control but are usually linked to land-dwelling habits, suggests that the species still spent some time on land.

== Classification ==
Macrospondylus is an early member of the crocodylomorph group Thalattosuchia, a clade of primarily marine reptiles that included some members adapted to a fully pelagic lifestyle. Within Thalattosuchia, two major groups are recognized: the long-snouted, gharial-like teleosauroids and the more highly marine-adapted metriorhynchoids. Macrospondylus belongs to the teleosauroids and is considered a basal member of the family Machimosauridae, a group of generally large, robust teleosauroids that often occupied the role of macropredators in their ecosystems. The cladogram below shows the relationships of teleosauroids based on Johnson and colleagues in 2020.

- Teleosauroidea
  - Plagiophthalmosuchus gracilirostris
  - - Teleosauridae
      - Indosinosuchus kalasinensis
      - - - Chinese teleosauroid (IVPP V 10098)
          - Mystriosaurus laurillardi
        - - Indosinosuchus potamosiamensis
          - - Teleosaurinae
              - Platysuchus multiscrobiculatus
              - Teleosaurus cadomensis
            - Aeolodontinae
              - Mycterosuchus nasutus
              - - Aeolodon priscus
                - - Sericodon jugleri
                  - Bathysuchus megarhinus
    - Machimosauridae
      - Macrospondylus bollensis
      - - Clovesuurdameredeor stephani
        - - Charitomenosuchus leedsi
          - - Seldsienean megistorhynchus
            - - Deslongchampsina larteti
              - Machimosaurinae
                - - cf. Proexochokefalos bouchardi
                  - Proexochokefalos heberti
                - - Neosteneosaurus edwardsi
                  - Andrianavoay baroni
                  - Machimosaurini
                    - Lemmysuchus obtusidens
                    - Yvridiosuchus boutilieri
                    - - Machimosaurus buffetauti
                      - - Machimosaurus mosae
                        - - Machimosaurus rex
                          - Machimosaurus hugii

== Paleobiology ==
=== Growth ===
Macrospondylus is well represented by hundreds of fossils, ranging from individuals smaller than a 1 meter (3.3 feet) to over 5 meters (16.4 feet). This makes it a good research subject in analyzing its growth patterns. In a 2023 study, Johnson and colleagues analyzed 62 specimens (16 juveniles, 7 subadults, and 39 adults), and found that many body parts grew proportionally with overall body size across all life stages, a type of growth called isometric growth. This pattern is highly unusual in vertebrates, where differential parts of the body have different growth rates, called allometric growth. Johnson and colleagues found that while limb scaling in Macrospondylus bollensis differed from that of alligators and crocodiles, it most closely matched the growth pattern of the Indian gharial, which likewise shows near-isometric growth. This results in juvenile Macrospondylus retaining a striking similarity in appearance to adult individuals. However, the true purpose and implications of this unique growth pattern is not fully understood.

=== Paleoecology ===
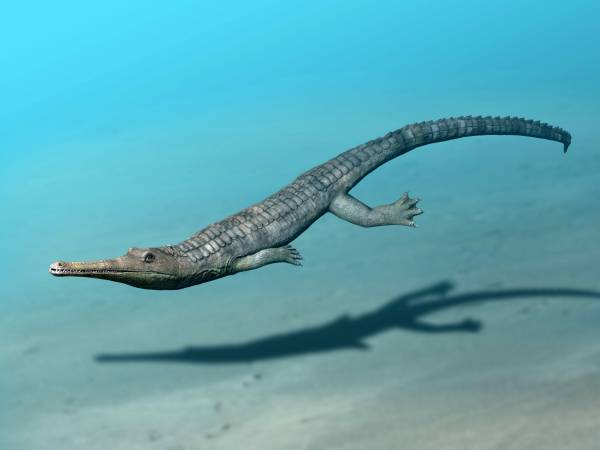
Restoration

Macrospondylus bollensis was well adapted to aquatic environments, likely living in coastal marine or brackish water ecosystems. It is the most abundant teleosauroid during the Toarcian stage of the Early Jurassic based on the amount of fossils, particularly in Germany. This abundance has been attributed to the generalist nature of this species. Generalist species can exploit a wide range of prey, both in type and body size. It has also been suggested that it was more flexible in what habitat it lived in, being able to thrive in many different environments.

Recent studies suggest that Macrospondylus may have been more aquatic than other Toarcian teleosauroids, possessing limited ability on land. However, analyses of bone microstructure and compactness across growth stages indicate that it was semi aquatic and possessed the ability to go on land if needed. It is also hypothesized that Macrospondylus would have still come on to land to lay its eggs. This is due to still possessing the ability to go on to land and no-known archosaurs (living or extinct) have ever been documented giving live birth.

=== Paleoenvironment ===
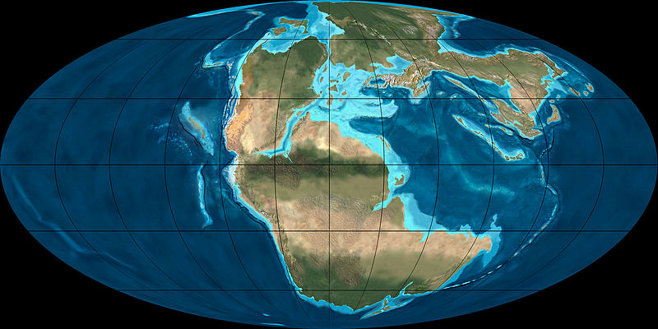
Early Jurassic map of the world

During the Early Jurassic, Europe was a warm, shallow marine region dotted with islands, forming part of the northern margin of the Tethys Ocean. This is represented in the Posidonia Shale, Whitby Mudstone, and Schistes bitemineux where Macrospondylus fossils are found. Much of the landscape consisted of coastal lagoons, tidal flats, and epicontinental seas, with widespread deposition of limestones, shales, and other marine sediments. The climate was generally humid and temperate, supporting diverse marine life such as fish, ammonites, ichthyosaurs, plesiosaurs, and early marine crocodylomorphs, alongside coastal and nearshore vegetation. These environments provided a mosaic of aquatic and semi-aquatic habitats, allowing species like Macrospondylus to exploit both land and water and facilitating the dispersal of organisms across the European archipelago.

== See also ==
- List of marine reptiles
