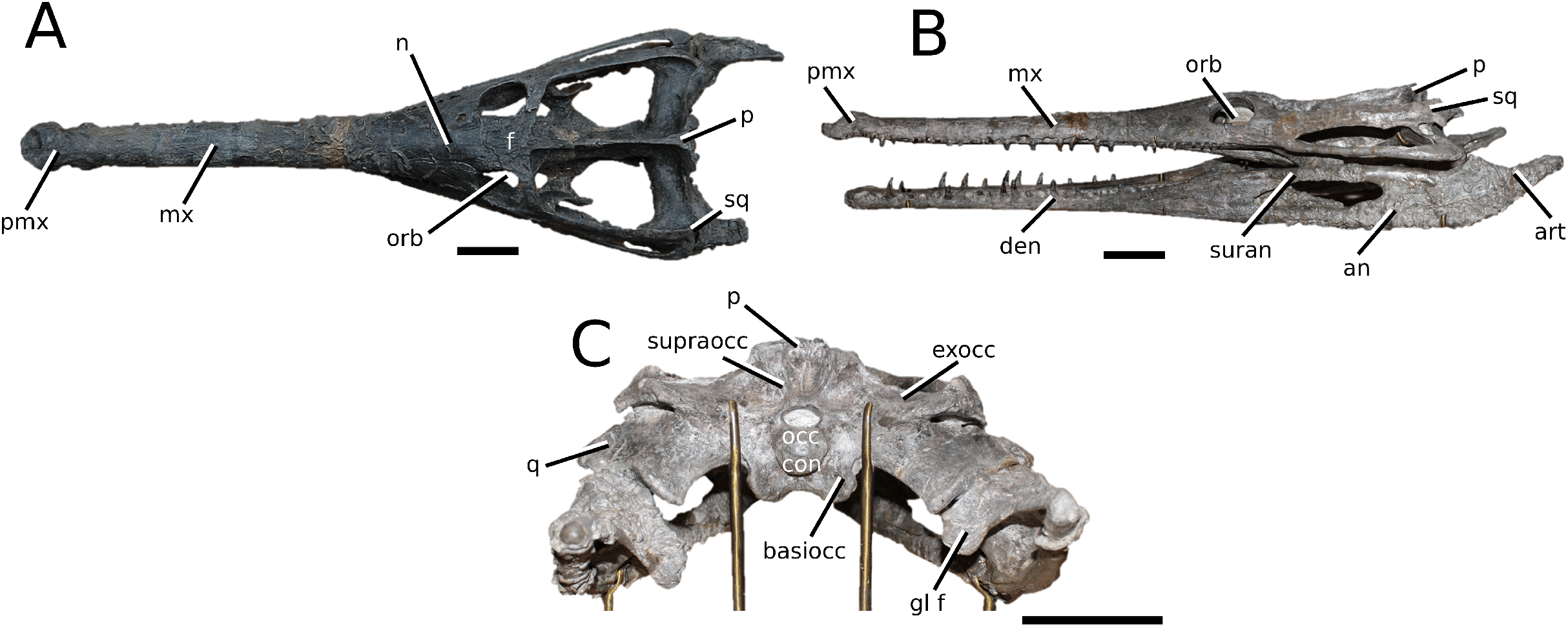
- Skull of P. heberti

Scientific classification
- Kingdom: Animalia
- Phylum: Chordata
- Class: Reptilia
- Clade: Pseudosuchia
- Clade: Crocodylomorpha
- Suborder: †Thalattosuchia
- Family: †Machimosauridae
- Subfamily: †Machimosaurinae
- Genus: †Proexochokefalos; Johnson et al., 2020

Type species
- †Steneosaurus heberti Morel de Glasville, 1876

Species
- †P. heberti (Morel de Glasville, 1876); †P. cf. bouchardi (Sauvage, 1872)

Synonyms
- Steneosaurus cf. bouchardi Sauvage, 1872

= Proexochokefalos =

Proexochokefalos Temporal range: Callovian-Kimmeridgian ~165–152 Ma

Extinct genus of reptiles

Proexochokefalos (meaning "big head with big tuberosities") is an extinct genus of machimosaurid teleosauroid from the Middle to Late Jurassic of France and Switzerland. In life, it was a large marine reptile that would have fed on other large animals.

== History ==
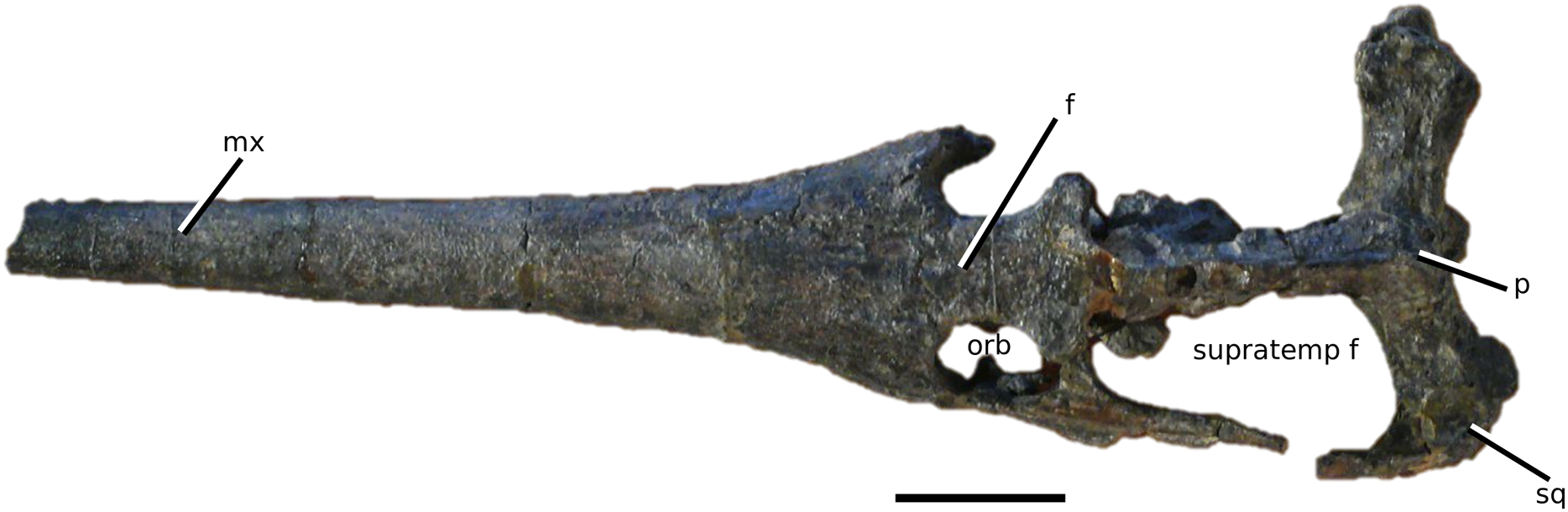
P. cf. bouchardi skull

The type species, P. heberti, was originally named "Steneosaurus" heberti by Morel de Glasville in 1876 from a roughly 1.1 meter (3.6 foot) long complete skull and mandible (MNHN.F 1890-13) found in the Callovian aged Marnes de Dives near Villers-sur-mer in the Calvados department of Normandy, France. The genus Steneosaurus was used as a longtime wastebasket taxon for various teleosauroid specimens and had more than a dozen species. The type species, Steneosaurus rostromajor is undiagnostic, making the genus and species dubious and invalid. Additionally, many species of so called "Steneosaurus" were found to be quite different and unrelated to one another, thus needing new generic names.

In a study by Michela Johnson and colleagues in 2020, "Steneosaurus" heberti was reclassified into the new genus Proexochokefalos, resulting in the new combination Proexochokefalos heberti. The species "Steneosaurus" depressus was also found to be a junior synonym of P. heberti. Another species referred to the genus, Proexochokefalos cf. bouchardi is known from remains from the Calcaire de Caen, France, and Reuchenette Formation, Switzerland.

== Classification ==
Proexochokefalos is a member of the family Machimosauridae, a group of large-bodied sea going reptiles. They are known for their robust skulls, powerful jaws, and heavily built bodies, and were among the top predators in their ecosystems. Proexochokefalos possesses an intermediate morphology between more basal and gracile machimosaurids and the larger and more heavily built members of the tribe Machimosaurini.

The cladogram below is from an analysis conducted by Johnson and colleagues in 2020.

- Machimosauridae
  - Macrospondylus bollensis
  - - Clovesuurdameredeor stephani
    - - Charitomenosuchus leedsi
      - - Seldsienean megistorhynchus
        - - Deslongchampsina larteti
          - Machimosaurinae
            - - Proexochokefalos hebertii
              - cf. Proexochokefalos bouchardi
            - - Neosteneosaurus edwardsi
              - Andrianavoay baroni
              - Machimosaurini
                - Lemmysuchus obtusidens
                - Yvridiosuchus boutilieri
                - - Machimosaurus buffetauti
                  - - Machimosaurus mosae
                    - - Machimosaurus rex
                      - Machimosaurus hugii

== Ecology ==
Proexochokefalos possessed a mandible well adapted for handling large prey, featuring some of the largest muscle attachment sites among machimosaurids. Its tooth morphology is also intermediate between that of typical "longirostrine" species such as Charitomenosuchus and the more durophagous Machimosaurus. These adaptations point to a shift towards feeding on larger prey items in Proexochokefalos and more derived machimosaurids. However it was not adapted for durophagy to the same extent as Machimosaurus, instead being more of a generalist of large fish and marine reptiles.
