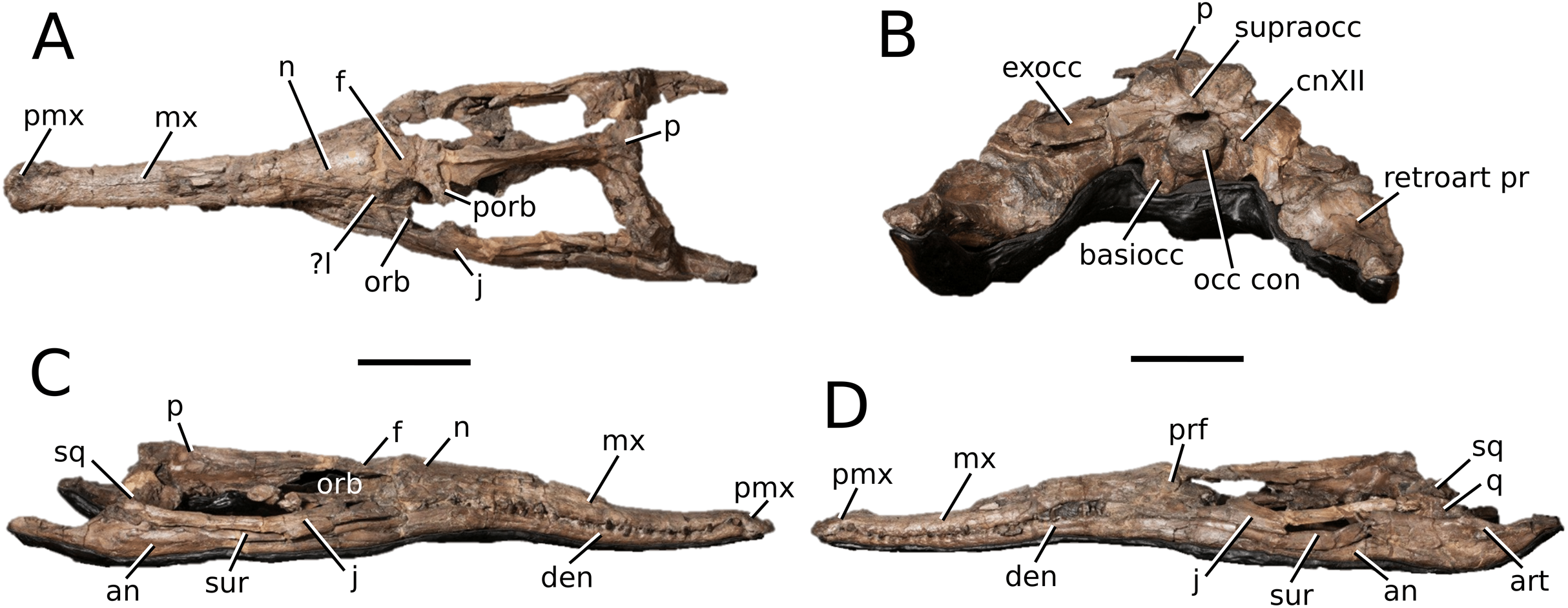
- Holotype skull in multiple views

Scientific classification
- Kingdom: Animalia
- Phylum: Chordata
- Class: Reptilia
- Clade: Pseudosuchia
- Clade: Crocodylomorpha
- Suborder: †Thalattosuchia
- Family: †Machimosauridae
- Subfamily: †Machimosaurinae
- Tribe: †Machimosaurini
- Genus: †Lemmysuchus; Johnson et al., 2017
- Species: †L. obtusidens

Binomial name
- †Lemmysuchus obtusidens Andrews, 1909

Synonyms
- "Steneosaurus" obtusidens Andrews, 1909

= Lemmysuchus =

Lemmysuchus Temporal range: Late Jurassic, Callovian

Extinct genus of reptiles

Lemmysuchus is a genus of machimosaurid thalattosuchian from the Middle Jurassic Callovian of England and France. Like many other teleosauroids from Europe, it has had a convoluted taxonomic history.

== History ==
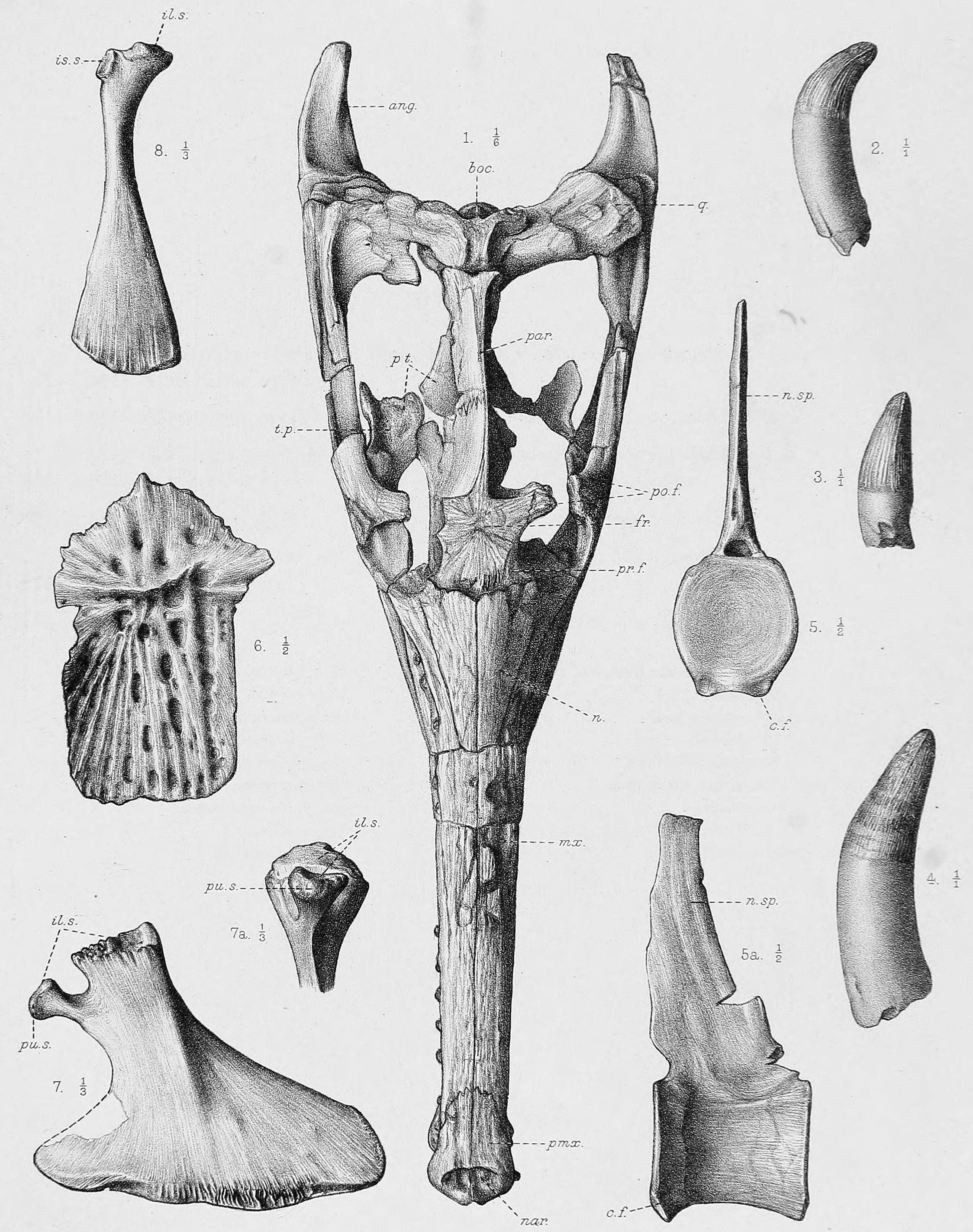
Skull and other elements of the holotype specimen

"Steneosaurus" obtusidens was first described from the Callovian-aged Oxford Clay Formation of Cambridgeshire, southeastern England on the basis of a partial skeleton (NHMUK PV R 3168). Characters cited as diagnostic for "S." obtusidens included: short rostrum (preorbital length 52 percent of total skull length); teeth blunt and rounded at the tips; armor adorned with elongate pit ornamentation.

The validity of "Steneosaurus" obtusidens was disputed in a 1987 paper reviewing the type specimens of nominal teleosauroid species from the Oxford Clay. Characters used by Charles William Andrews to distinguish "S." obtusidens from other species were dismissed as variable within specimens of Steneosaurus edwardsi, and "S." obtusidens was sunk as a junior synonym of Steneosaurus durobrivensis (=S. edwardsi). Some authors considered this taxon a probable junior synonym of Machimosaurus hughii based on a subsequently discovered specimen found in Callovian-age exposures in Calvados, Lower Normandy, France, though they stressed that a taxonomic review of blunt-snouted teleosaurids was needed. This synonymy was accepted in a 2009 paper regarding thalattosuchian morphometrics without comment.

In 2013, a new specimen of Machimosaurus was described from Late Jurassic (Kimmeridgian deposits in southern Germany (later named Machimosaurus buffetauti), and it became clear that variation within blunt-toothed teleosauroids was taxonomically significant enough for "Steneosaurus" obtusidens to be recognized as generically distinct from Machimosaurus. Other cladistic and comparative studies agreed with this assessment, recovering "S." obtusidens in a clade with Machimosaurus and Steneosaurus edwardsi.

In 2017, the species was moved to its own genus, Lemmysuchus, referring to Ian Fraser Kilmister, better known as "Lemmy", of the band Motörhead, and the Greek word for crocodile, soukhos.

== Classification ==
Lemmysuchus is a member of the derived group of machimosaurids called Machimosaurini, which includes the largest and most robust members. It is closely related to other large machimosaurids such as Yvridiosuchus and Machimosaurus.

The cladogram below is from an analysis conducted by Johnson and colleagues in 2020.

- Machimosauridae
  - Macrospondylus bollensis
  - - Clovesuurdameredeor stephani
    - - Charitomenosuchus leedsi
      - - Seldsienean megistorhynchus
        - - Deslongchampsina larteti
          - Machimosaurinae
            - - Proexochokefalos hebertii
              - cf. Proexochokefalos bouchardi
            - - Neosteneosaurus edwardsi
              - Andrianavoay baroni
              - Machimosaurini
                - Lemmysuchus obtusidens
                - Yvridiosuchus boutilieri
                - - Machimosaurus buffetauti
                  - - Machimosaurus mosae
                    - - Machimosaurus rex
                      - Machimosaurus hugii

== Ecology ==
Lemmysuchus lived during a time when much of Europe was covered by shallow seas and was an island archipelago. It had very large muscle attachment sites and robust jaws, meaning it had a powerful bite. Coupled with its straight and blunt dentition, Lemmysuchus was well adapted for feeding on large and armored prey items such as turtles and large fish.

Lemmysuchus is estimated to have a body length of roughly 5.8 meters (19 feet) based on known remains.
