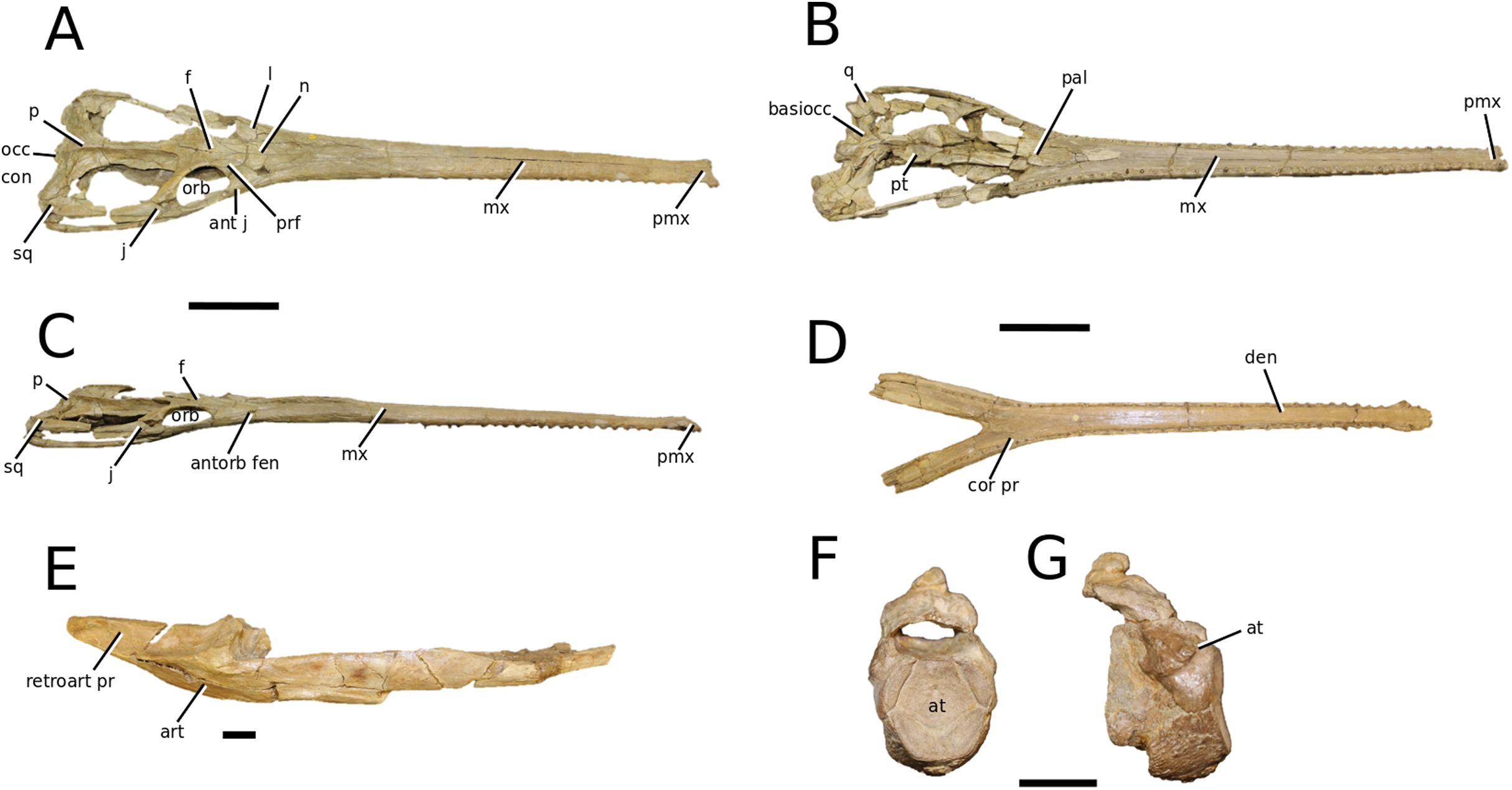
- Holotype skull and vertebra

Scientific classification
- Kingdom: Animalia
- Phylum: Chordata
- Class: Reptilia
- Clade: Pseudosuchia
- Clade: Crocodylomorpha
- Suborder: †Thalattosuchia
- Family: †Machimosauridae
- Genus: †Charitomenosuchus; Johnson et al., 2020
- Species: †C. leedsi

Binomial name
- †Charitomenosuchus leedsi (Andrews, 1909)

Synonyms
- Steneosaurus leedsi Andrews, 1909; Steneosaurus teleosauroides Auer, 1909; Steneosaurus pictaviensis Vignaud, 1998

= Charitomenosuchus =

Charitomenosuchus Temporal range: Middle Jurassic, middle Callovian

Extinct genus of reptiles

Charitomenosuchus (meaning "graceful crocodile") is an extinct genus of machimosaurid teleosauroid from the Callovian Oxford Clay Formation of England.

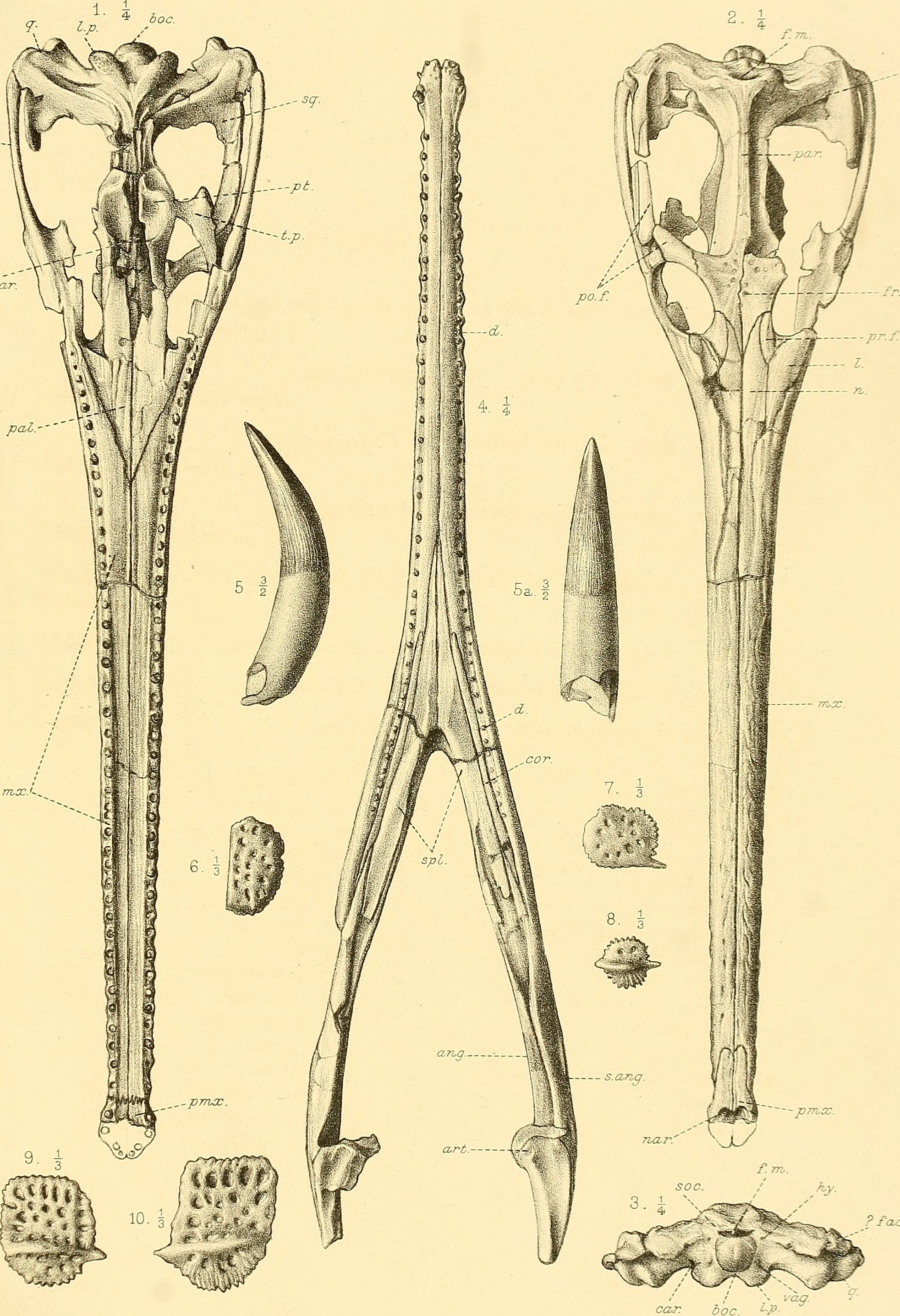
Illustration of the holotype

== History ==
The type species was originally named "Steneosaurus" leedsi by Andrews in 1909 on the basis of three specimens. The genus Steneosaurus was used as a longtime wastebasket taxon for various teleosauroid specimens and had more than a dozen species. The type species, Steneosaurus rostromajor is undiagnostic, making the genus and species dubious and invalid. Additionally, many species of so called "Steneosaurus" were found to be quite different and unrelated to one another, thus needing new generic names.

In her unpublished 2019 thesis, Michela Johnson coined the nomen ex dissertationae Charitomenosuchus for S. leedsi. The new genus and combination, Charitomenosuchus leedsi was formally published by Johnson and colleagues in 2020.

== Classification ==
Charitomenosuchus is classified as one of the most basal machimosaurids, being outside the subfamily Machimosaurinae. It's more gracile and lightly-built morphology is typical of basal machimosaurids while more derived members were large and much more robust.

The cladogram below is from an analysis by Johnson and colleagues in 2020.

- Machimosauridae
  - Macrospondylus bollensis
  - - Clovesuurdameredeor stephani
    - - Charitomenosuchus leedsi
      - - Seldsienean megistorhynchus
        - - Deslongchampsina larteti
          - Machimosaurinae
            - - Proexochokefalos hebertii
              - cf. Proexochokefalos bouchardi
            - - Neosteneosaurus edwardsi
              - Andrianavoay baroni
              - Machimosaurini
                - Lemmysuchus obtusidens
                - Yvridiosuchus boutilieri
                - - Machimosaurus buffetauti
                  - - Machimosaurus mosae
                    - - Machimosaurus rex
                      - Machimosaurus hugii

== Ecology ==
In life, Charitomenosuchus was a marine hunter of small prey. It had proportionally one of the most gracile jaws of all machimosaurids, with a quick bite but relatively weak bite force. Additionally, it had a relatively weak front bite, meaning it could grab prey quickly but likely took longer to overpower and process. This suggests that Charitomenosuchus was adapted for catching quick prey such as small fish and cephalopods that it coexisted with.
