= Bedford limestone =

Bedford limestone may refer to:

- Indiana limestone, in the United States
- Bedford limestone from the Cornbrash Formation, in England
