= 1831 in paleontology =

Paleontology or palaeontology is the study of prehistoric life forms on Earth through the examination of plant and animal fossils. This includes the study of body fossils, tracks (ichnites), burrows, cast-off parts, fossilised feces (coprolites), palynomorphs and chemical residues. Because humans have encountered fossils for millennia, paleontology has a long history both before and after becoming formalized as a science. This article records significant discoveries and events related to paleontology that occurred or were published in the year 1831.

== Crocodylomorphs ==
=== New taxa ===
Taxon	Novelty	Status	Author(s)	Age	Unit	Location	Notes	Images
Macrospondylus	Gen. nov.	Valid	von Meyer	Toarcian	Posidonia Shale	Germany	A machimosaurid	

== Pterosaurs ==
- August Goldfuss depicted pterosaurs as flying reptiles that used their wing claws to climb cliffs. He hypothesized that on land, they would have had to travel on all fours. He also suggested they may have been covered in hair.

=== New taxa ===
Taxon	Novelty	Status	Author(s)	Age	Unit	Location	Notes	Images
Pterodactylus crassirostris	Sp. nov.	Valid	Goldfuss	Kimmeridgian	Solnhofen limestone	Germany	Later renamed Scaphognathus crassirostris	
Ornithocephalus münsteri	Sp. nov.	Valid	Goldfuss	Kimmeridgian	Solnhofen limestone	Germany	Later renamed Rhamphorhynchus muensteri	
Pterodactylus medius	Sp. nov.	Nomen dubium	Münster	Kimmeridgian	Solnhofen limestone	Germany	The only specimen was destroyed in World War II but shows similarities to Germanodactylus.	

== Paleontologists ==
- Birth of Othniel Charles Marsh on October 29; noted for naming many dinosaur families and genera, including Apatosaurus and Allosaurus.
