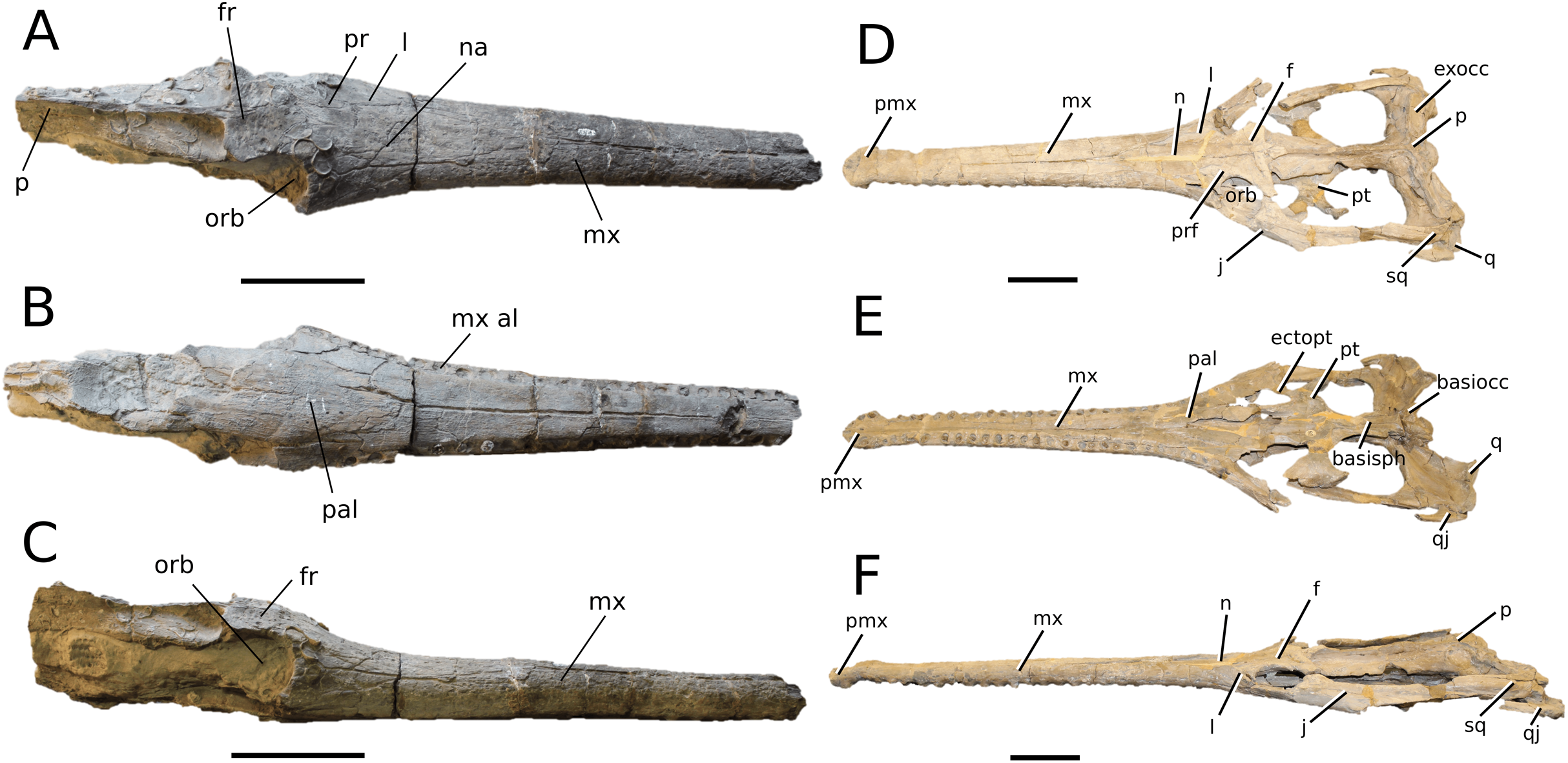
- Holotype and assigned specimen

Scientific classification
- Kingdom: Animalia
- Phylum: Chordata
- Class: Reptilia
- Clade: Pseudosuchia
- Clade: Crocodylomorpha
- Suborder: †Thalattosuchia
- Family: †Machimosauridae
- Subfamily: †Machimosaurinae
- Genus: †Neosteneosaurus; Johnson et al., 2020
- Species: †N. edwardsi

Binomial name
- †Neosteneosaurus edwardsi (Eudes-Deslongchamps, 1868)

Synonyms
- Steneosaurus dubroviensis; Steneosaurus edwardsi Eudes-Deslongchamps, 1868; Steneosaurus hulkei Andrews, 1913

= Neosteneosaurus =

Neosteneosaurus Temporal range: Callovian-Oxfordian ~165–158 Ma

Genus of reptiles (fossil)

Neosteneosaurus is a genus of machimosaurid, known from the Middle Jurassic Oxford Clay of the UK, and Marnes de Dives, France.

== History ==
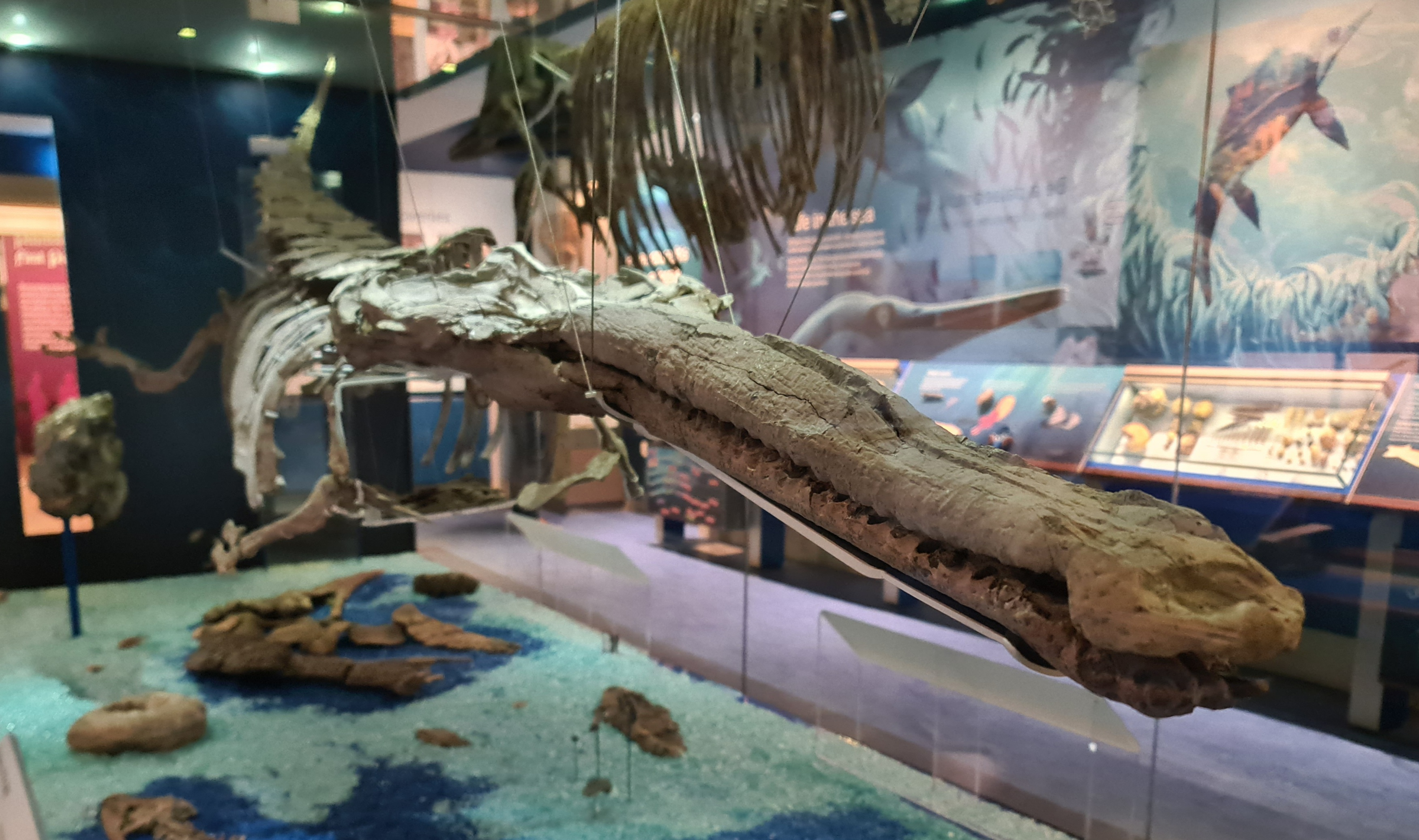
Skeleton at Peterborough Museum

The type species, N. edwardsi, was originally named as a species of Steneosaurus in 1868 as "Steneosaurus" edwardsi in 1868. The genus Steneosaurus was used as a longtime wastebasket taxon for various teleosauroid specimens and had more than a dozen species. The type species, Steneosaurus rostromajor is undiagnostic, making the genus and species dubious and invalid. Additionally, many species of so called "Steneosaurus" were found to be quite different and unrelated to one another, thus needing new generic names.

In 2020, a study by Michela Johnson and colleagues in 2020 reclassified "Steneosaurus" edwardsi into the new genus Neosteneosaurus. The species "Steneosaurus" durobrivensis and "Steneosaurus" hulkei were also found to be junior synonyms of N. edwardsi.

== Classification ==
Neosteneosaurus is a member of the machimosaurid subfamily Machimosaurinae. It is closely related to other large-bodied members such as Lemmysuchus and Machimosaurus.

The cladogram below is from an analysis by Johnson and colleagues in 2020.

- Machimosauridae
  - Macrospondylus bollensis
  - - Clovesuurdameredeor stephani
    - - Charitomenosuchus leedsi
      - - Seldsienean megistorhynchus
        - - Deslongchampsina larteti
          - Machimosaurinae
            - - Proexochokefalos hebertii
              - cf. Proexochokefalos bouchardi
            - - Neosteneosaurus edwardsi
              - Andrianavoay baroni
              - Machimosaurini
                - Lemmysuchus obtusidens
                - Yvridiosuchus boutilieri
                - - Machimosaurus buffetauti
                  - - Machimosaurus mosae
                    - - Machimosaurus rex
                      - Machimosaurus hugii

== Ecology ==
In life, Neosteneosaurus was a large and robust predator of large-bodied marine prey. It had well suited for tackling large prey, with large teeth and some of the largest muscle attachment sites among machimosaurids. However, this animal was still not at the level of more derived and more durophagous machimosaurids such as Machimosaurus. Neosteneosaurus was part of a shift of machimosaurids adapting to larger prey, functioning as a generalist predator of large fish and marine reptiles.

In 2015, it was estimated at more than 7 m (23 ft) in length. In 2016, this estimate was revised down to 6.6 m (22 ft), but even with such measurement, this animal remains to be the largest known Middle Jurassic crocodylomorph. This would make Neosteneosaurus amongst the top of the food chain in its ecosystem.
