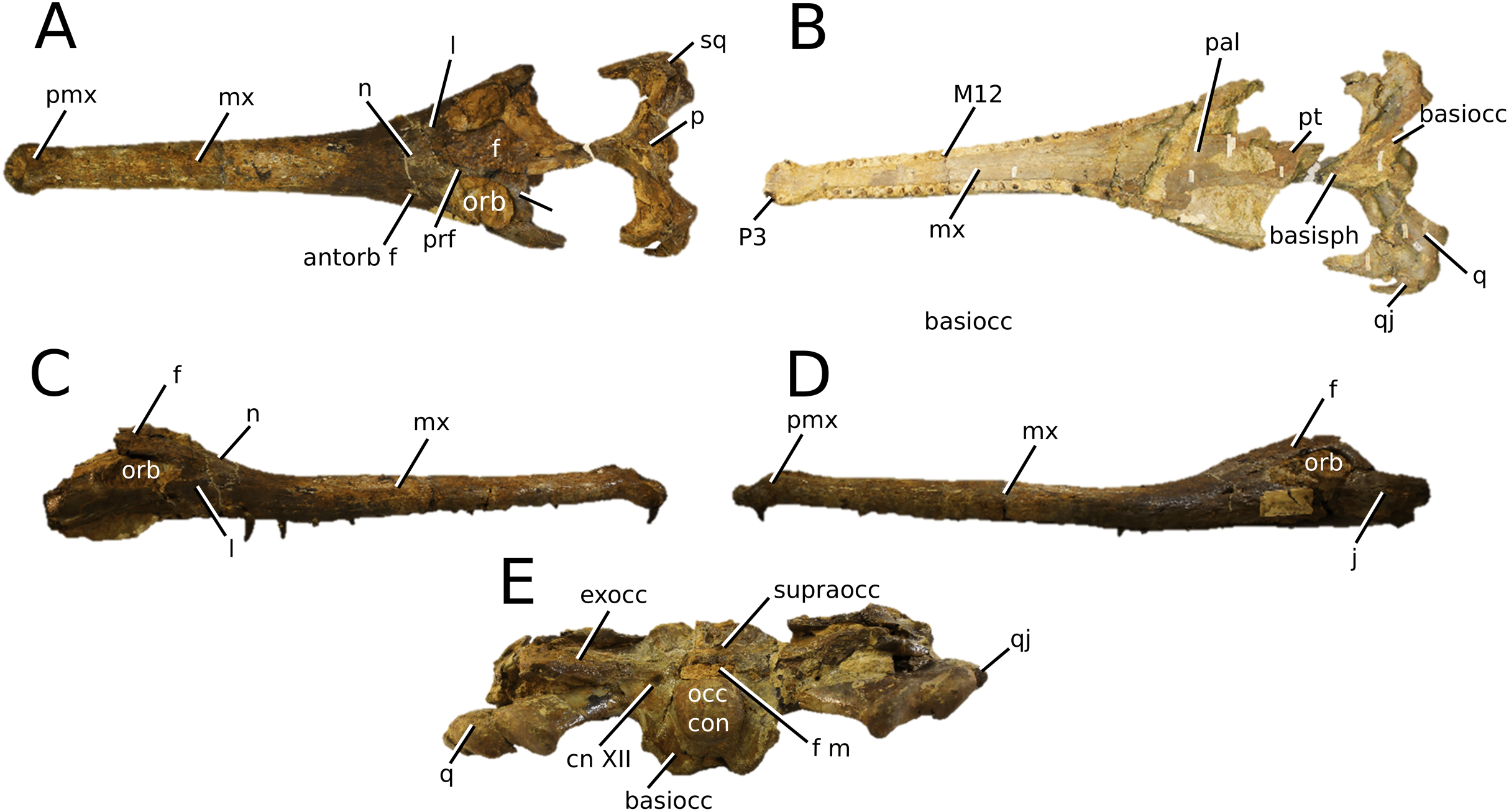
- Neotype skull

Scientific classification
- Kingdom: Animalia
- Phylum: Chordata
- Class: Reptilia
- Clade: Pseudosuchia
- Clade: Crocodylomorpha
- Suborder: †Thalattosuchia
- Family: †Machimosauridae
- Genus: †Deslongchampsina; Johnson et al., 2020
- Species: †D. larteti

Binomial name
- †Deslongchampsina larteti (Eudes-Deslongchamp, 1866)

= Deslongchampsina =

Deslongchampsina Temporal range: Middle Jurassic Bathonian

Extinct genus of marine crocodilians

Deslongchampsina is an extinct genus of machimosaurid crocodyliform from the Middle Jurassic (Bathonian) Cornbrash Formation of England and France, possibly from the Calcaire de Caen.

== History ==
The type species was originally named Steneosaurus lerteti in 1868. The genus Steneosaurus was used as a longtime wastebasket taxon for various teleosauroid specimens and had more than a dozen species. The type species, Steneosaurus rostromajor is undiagnostic, making the genus and species dubious and invalid. Additionally, many species of so called "Steneosaurus" were found to be quite different and unrelated to one another, thus needing new generic names.

In 2019, Michela Johnson and colleagues redescribed "Steneosaurus" larteti, creating the new genus and combination Deslongchampsina larteti.

== Classification ==
Deslongchampsina was an intermediate machimosaurid, being closely related to but not a part of derived subfamily Machimosaurinae.

The cladogram below is from an analysis conducted by Johnson and colleagues in 2020.

- Machimosauridae
  - Macrospondylus bollensis
  - - Clovesuurdameredeor stephani
    - - Charitomenosuchus leedsi
      - - Seldsienean megistorhynchus
        - - Deslongchampsina larteti
          - Machimosaurinae
            - - Proexochokefalos hebertii
              - cf. Proexochokefalos bouchardi
            - - Neosteneosaurus edwardsi
              - Andrianavoay baroni
              - Machimosaurini
                - Lemmysuchus obtusidens
                - Yvridiosuchus boutilieri
                - - Machimosaurus buffetauti
                  - - Machimosaurus mosae
                    - - Machimosaurus rex
                      - Machimosaurus hugii

== Ecology ==
Its snout was not as elongated as some other teleosauroids (mesorostrine), and the shape of its jaws and teeth suggest that it was a generalist predator, unlike the more powerful contemporary machimosaurin Yvridiosuchus.
