= Kellaways Formation =

Geological formation in England

- Stratigraphic range: Callovian
- Type: Formation
- Unit of: Ancholme Group
- Underlies: Oxford Clay
- Overlies: Cornbrash Formation
- Thickness: 0-50 m

Lithology
- Primary: mudstone, siltstone, sandstone

Location
- Region: England (onshore); St George's Channel (offshore)
- Country: United Kingdom

The Kellaways Formation is a geological formation of the Callovian Stage from the Jurassic. It is found in the British Isles, immediately above the Great Oolite Group: below the Oxford Clay Formation and above the Cornbrash. It consists of two layers, the Kellaways Sand, a light green-grey clayish silt and sand with layers of sand concretions, overlying the Kellaways Clay, a dark grey plastic fissile clay.

They were laid down during the Callovian, offshore from the London-Brabant Island, between 165 and 160 million years ago, in the latitude of the modern Mediterranean Sea, when the structure of Britain was still taking shape. At this stage, the coal swamps of the north-western shore of the island had subsided below the sea so that the Kellaways clay was formed in fairly deep water and the Kellaways sand was blown and washed from what had become the hot desert land.

The holotype of the indeterminate eusauropod "Ornithopsis" leedsii has been recovered from this formation.

== See also ==
- Guliemina
