= Guliemina =

Guliemina Temporal range: Callovian

Scientific classification
- Kingdom: Animalia
- Phylum: Mollusca
- Class: Cephalopoda
- Subclass: †Ammonoidea
- Genus: †Guliemina

Extinct genus of molluscs

Guliemina is a species of extinct ammonite from the Jurassic period in England. It lived during the Callovian period of the Jurassic, and its fossils are often found in the Kellaways rock strata of Chippenham, Wiltshire.

== See also ==
- Gryphaea dilitata
- Jurassic Coast
