= Cornbrash Formation =

Geological formation in England

- Stratigraphic range: Bathonian-Callovian 168–164 Ma
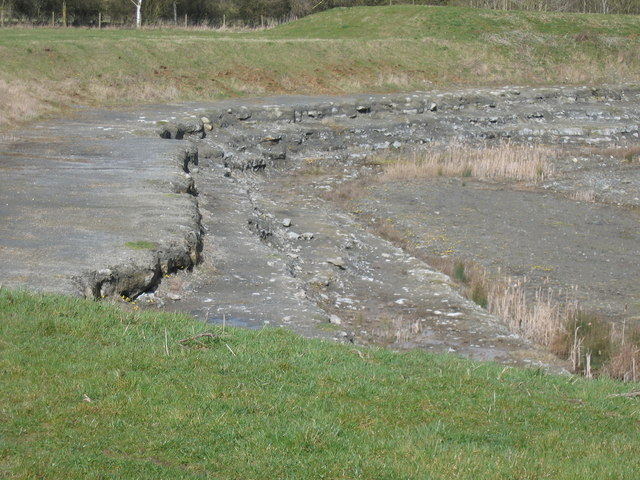
- Cornbrash Formation at Shorncote Quarry in Gloucestershire
- Type: Geological formation
- Unit of: Great Oolite Group
- Underlies: Kellaways Formation, Cayton Clay Formation
- Overlies: Forest Marble Formation, Blisworth Clay Formation, Scalby Formation
- Thickness: 0-10.5 m

Lithology
- Primary: Limestone

Location
- Region: England
- Country: United Kingdom
- Extent: Dorset coast to Yorkshire coast

The Cornbrash Formation is a Middle Jurassic geological formation in England. It ranges in age from Bathonian to Callovian, the uppermost part of the Middle Jurassic. Dinosaur remains are among the fossils that have been recovered from the formation, although none have yet been referred to a specific genus. The name Cornbrash is an old English agricultural name applied in Wiltshire to a variety of loose rubble or brash which, in that part of the country, forms a good soil for growing corn. The name was adopted by William Smith for a thin band of shelly limestone which, in the south of England, breaks up in the manner indicated. Although only a thin group of rocks (10–25 feet c. 3–7 m), it is remarkably persistent; it may be traced from Weymouth to the Yorkshire coast, but in north Lincolnshire it is very thin, and probably dies out in the neighborhood of the Humber. It appears again, however, as a thin bed in Gristhorpe Bay, Cayton Bay, Wheatcroft, Newton Dale and Langdale. In the inland exposures in Yorkshire it is difficult to follow on account of its thinness, and the fact that it passes up into dark shales in many places the so-called clays of the Cornbrash, with Avicula echinata. The Cornbrash is of little value for building or road-making, although it is used locally; in the south of England it is not oolitic, but in Yorkshire it is a rubbly, marly, frequently ironshot oolitic limestone. In Bedfordshire it has been termed the Bedford limestone.

== Fossils ==
The Cornbrash is a very fossiliferous formation; the fauna indicates a transition from the Lower to the Middle Oolites, though it is probably more nearly related to that of the beds above than to those below. Good localities for fossils are Radipole near Weymouth, Closworth, Wincanton, Trowbridge, Cirencester, Witney, Peterborough and Sudbrook Park near Lincoln. A few of the important fossils are: Waldheimia lagenalis, Pecten levis, Avicula echinata, Ostrea fiabelloides, Mycicites decurtatus, Echinobrissus clunicularis. Macrocephalites macrocephalus is abundant in the midland counties but rarer in the south; belemnites are not known. Indeterminate stegosaurian dinosaur material (sometimes known under the Lexovisaurus) have been discovered in this formation. The teleosaurid crocodyliformes Yvridiosuchus, Seldsienean, Clovesuurdameredeor and Deslongchampsina are known from the formation.

== See also ==
- List of dinosaur-bearing rock formations
  - List of stratigraphic units with indeterminate dinosaur fossils
