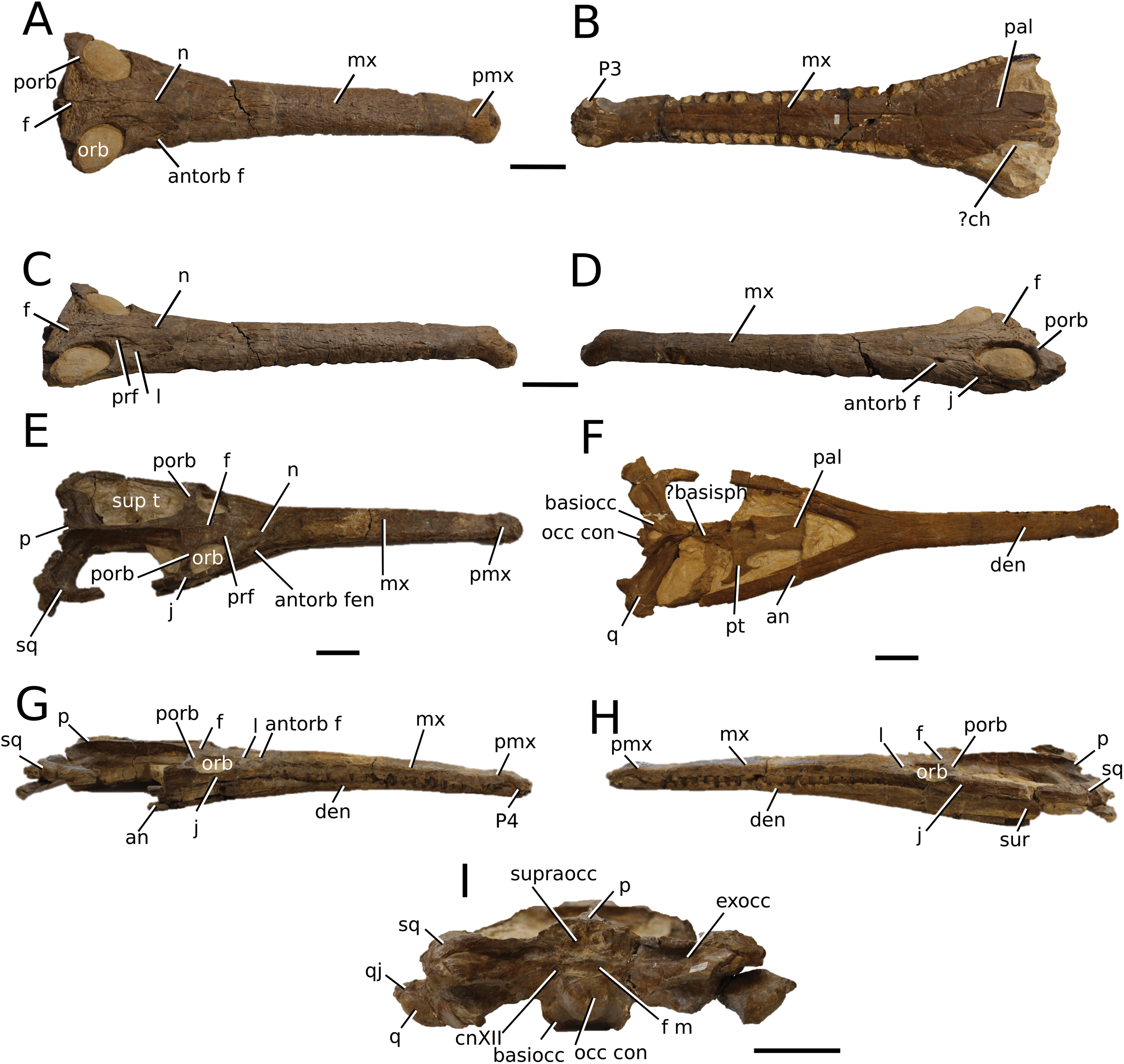
- Holotype of 'Y. boutilieri and referred specimen (holotype of "S." meretrix)

Scientific classification
- Kingdom: Animalia
- Phylum: Chordata
- Class: Reptilia
- Clade: Pseudosuchia
- Clade: Crocodylomorpha
- Suborder: †Thalattosuchia
- Family: †Machimosauridae
- Tribe: †Machimosaurini
- Genus: †Yvridiosuchus; Johnson et al., 2020
- Species: †Y. boutilieri

Binomial name
- †Yvridiosuchus boutilieri (Eudes-Deslongchamps, 1868)

Synonyms
- Steneosaurus boutilieri Eudes-Deslongchamps, 1868; Teleosaurus brevidens Philips, 1871; "Steneosaurus" meretrix Phizackerley, 1951

= Yvridiosuchus =

Yvridiosuchus Temporal range: Middle Jurassic Bathonian

Extinct genus of marine crocodilians

Yvridiosuchus (meaning "hybrid crocodile") is an extinct genus of machimosaurid crocodyliform from the Middle Jurassic (Bathonian age) Cornbrash Formation of England and the Sommet de la Grande Oolithe, Calvados, France.

== History ==
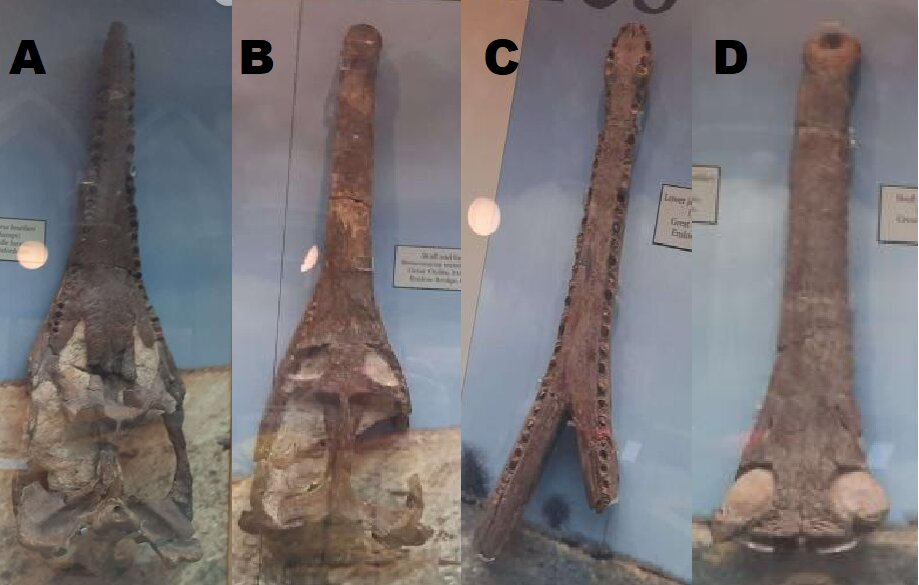
Four skulls assigned to Yvridiosuchus at the OUMNH; a skull assigned to Y. boutilieri (A), the holotype skull of "Steneosaurus" meretrix (B), a jaw assigned to Y. boutilieri (C) and the holotype skull of Y. boutilieri (D)

The type species was originally named in 1868 as the species Steneosaurus boutilieri. The genus Steneosaurus was used as a longtime wastebasket taxon for various teleosauroid specimens and had more than a dozen species. The type species, Steneosaurus rostromajor is undiagnostic, making the genus and species dubious and invalid. Additionally, many species of so-called "Steneosaurus" were found to be quite different and unrelated to one another, thus needing new generic names.

In 2019, Michela Johnson and colleagues redescribed "Steneosaurus" boutillieri, creating the new genus and combination Yvridiosuchus boutilieri. Its name references its combination of traits seen in both more basal and more derived machimosaurids. They also found the species "Steneosaurus" meretrix.

== Classification ==
Yvridiosuchus is the oldest known member of Machimosaurini, a clade of large, predatory machimosaurids with powerful jaws and teeth. Yvridiosuchus was named on the basis that it has characteristics of both earlier machimosaurids and the derived machimosaurins, such as conical, blunt teeth.

The cladogram below is from an analysis by Johnson and colleagues in 2020.

- Machimosauridae
  - Macrospondylus bollensis
  - - Clovesuurdameredeor stephani
    - - Charitomenosuchus leedsi
      - - Seldsienean megistorhynchus
        - - Deslongchampsina larteti
          - Machimosaurinae
            - - Proexochokefalos hebertii
              - cf. Proexochokefalos bouchardi
            - - Neosteneosaurus edwardsi
              - Andrianavoay baroni
              - Machimosaurini
                - Lemmysuchus obtusidens
                - Yvridiosuchus boutilieri
                - - Machimosaurus buffetauti
                  - - Machimosaurus mosae
                    - - Machimosaurus rex
                      - Machimosaurus hugii

== Ecology ==
Yvridiosuchus had large and powerful jaws, with very large muscle attachment sites. Additionally, this species possessed both conical and blunt dentition. All of this suggests that it was well adapted for feeding on large and armored prey items such as turtles and large fish.

It co-existed with the more generalist machimosaurid Deslongchampsina, showing how multpiple machimosaurids could coexist by focusing on different types of prey.
