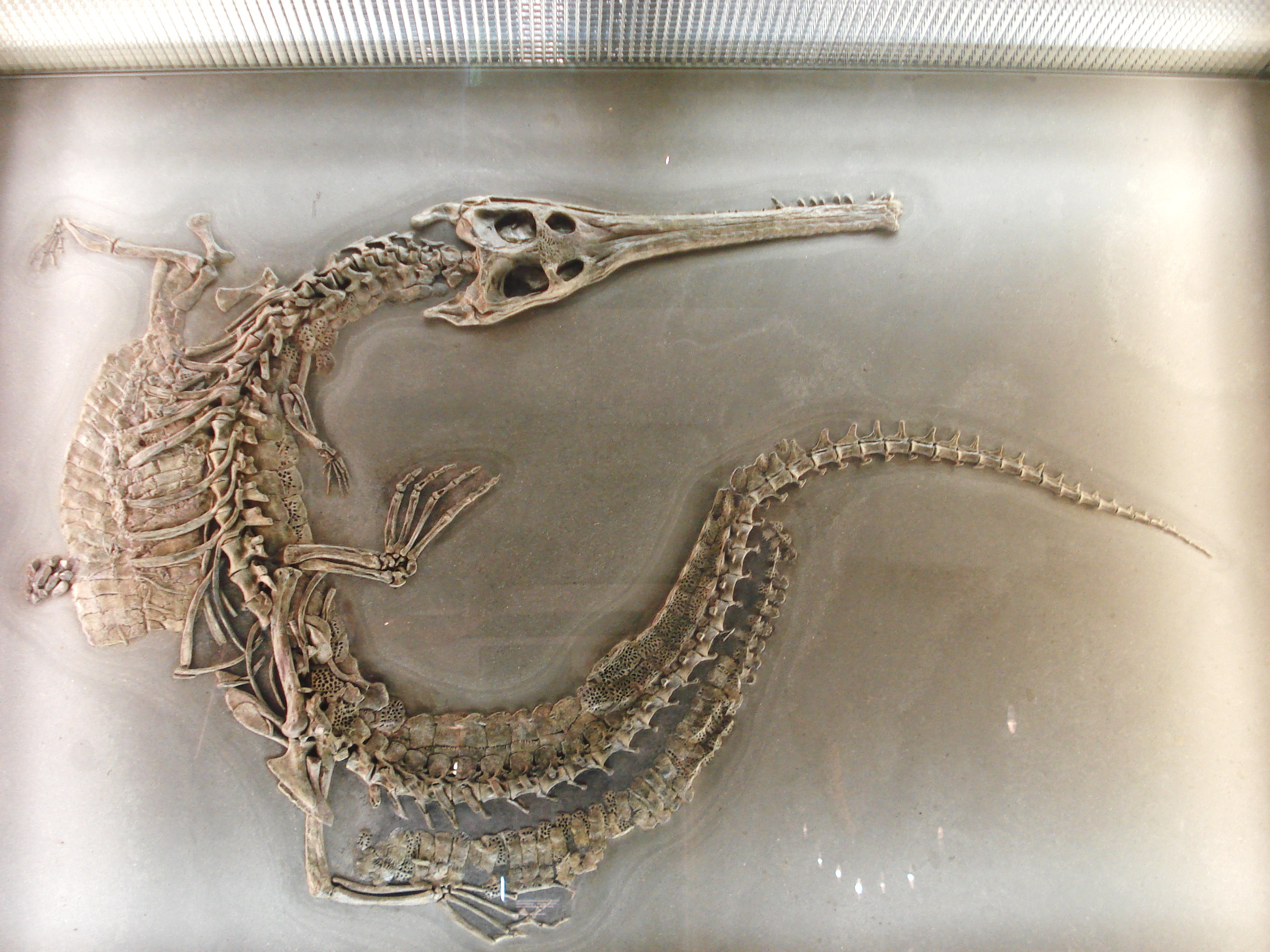
- Macrospondylus bollensis

Scientific classification
- Kingdom: Animalia
- Phylum: Chordata
- Class: Reptilia
- Clade: Archosauria
- Clade: Pseudosuchia
- Clade: Crocodylomorpha
- Suborder: †Thalattosuchia
- Superfamily: †Teleosauroidea
- Family: †Machimosauridae; Jouve et al., 2016

Subgroups
- †Charitomenosuchus; †Clovesuurdameredeor; †Deslongchampsina; †Macrospondylus; †Seldsienean; †Machimosaurinae; †Andrianavoay; †Neosteneosaurus; †Proexochokefalos; †Machimosaurini; †Lemmysuchus; †Machimosaurus; †Yvridiosuchus

= Machimosauridae =

Machimosauridae Temporal range: Early Jurassic-Early Cretaceous, 183–130 Ma

Extinct family of reptiles

Machimosauridae is an extinct family of teleosauroid thalattosuchian crocodyliforms. The family was first identified in 2016, when fossils of teleosauroid thalattosuchians, including an indeterminate close relative of Lemmysuchus and Machimosaurus, were described from the Middle Jurassic (Bathonian) of Morocco. The family was largely expanded in 2020 when the systematics of Teleosauroidea were re-reviewed. Members of this family generally were larger than the teleosaurids.

== Classification ==
Machimosauridae is a diverse group of teleosauroids, phylogenetically defined in the PhyloCode by Mark T. Young and colleagues as "the largest clade within Teleosauroidea containing Machimosaurus hugii, but not Teleosaurus cadomensis." The less inclusive subfamily Machimosaurinae is defined in the PhyloCode as "the largest clade within Teleosauroidea containing Machimosaurus hugii, but not Deslongchampsina larteti, Macrospondylus bollensis, and Charitomenosuchus leedsi". The tribe Machimosaurini contains the largest, most robust, and latest living machimosaurids and is defined in the PhyloCode as "the largest clade within Teleosauroidea containing Machimosaurus hugii, but not Neosteneosaurus edwardsi". The members of the Machimosauridae share several unique characters among teleosauroids, which are:

- dorsally oriented external nares
- the premaxillary anterior and anterolateral margins are not sub-vertical and do not extend ventrally
- the premaxilla-maxilla suture is sub-rectangular and slightly interdigitating (most noticeably near the midline)
- no anterolateral expansion of the supratemporal fenestrae
- the postorbital is excluded from the orbit posteroventral margin
- a mostly horizontal pterygoid with a distinct posterolateral angle
- the cultriform process of the basisphenoid is exposed and bifurcates the pterygoids

The phylogenetic relationships of the Machimosauridae were analyzed in a comprehensive analysis of teleosauroid relationships. The results of the analysis are shown below:

- Machimosauridae
  - Macrospondylus bollensis
  - - Clovesuurdameredeor stephani
    - - Charitomenosuchus leedsi
      - - Seldsienean megistorhynchus
        - - Deslongchampsina larteti
          - Machimosaurinae
            - - Proexochokefalos hebertii
              - cf. Proexochokefalos bouchardi
            - - Neosteneosaurus edwardsi
              - Andrianavoay baroni
              - Machimosaurini
                - Lemmysuchus obtusidens
                - Yvridiosuchus boutilieri
                - - Machimosaurus buffetauti
                  - - Machimosaurus mosae
                    - - Machimosaurus rex
                      - Machimosaurus hugii

== Evolution ==
Machimosaurids grew in body size and diversified feeding strategies throughout their evolutionary history. Primitive machimosaurids, such as Macrospondylus and Charitomenosuchus, were longirostrine (long-snouted) generalists with body lengths less than 5 m (16 ft) long. Machimosaurines originated in the Bathonian stage of the Middle Jurassic and simultaneously underwent a decrease in snout length but an increase in body size with Neosteneosaurus reaching up to 6.6 m (22 ft) long. Machimosaurins were the largest teleosauroids, with body lengths up to 7.1 m (23 ft) (Machimosaurus rex), and were durophagous hunters, meaning they fed on hard prey.
