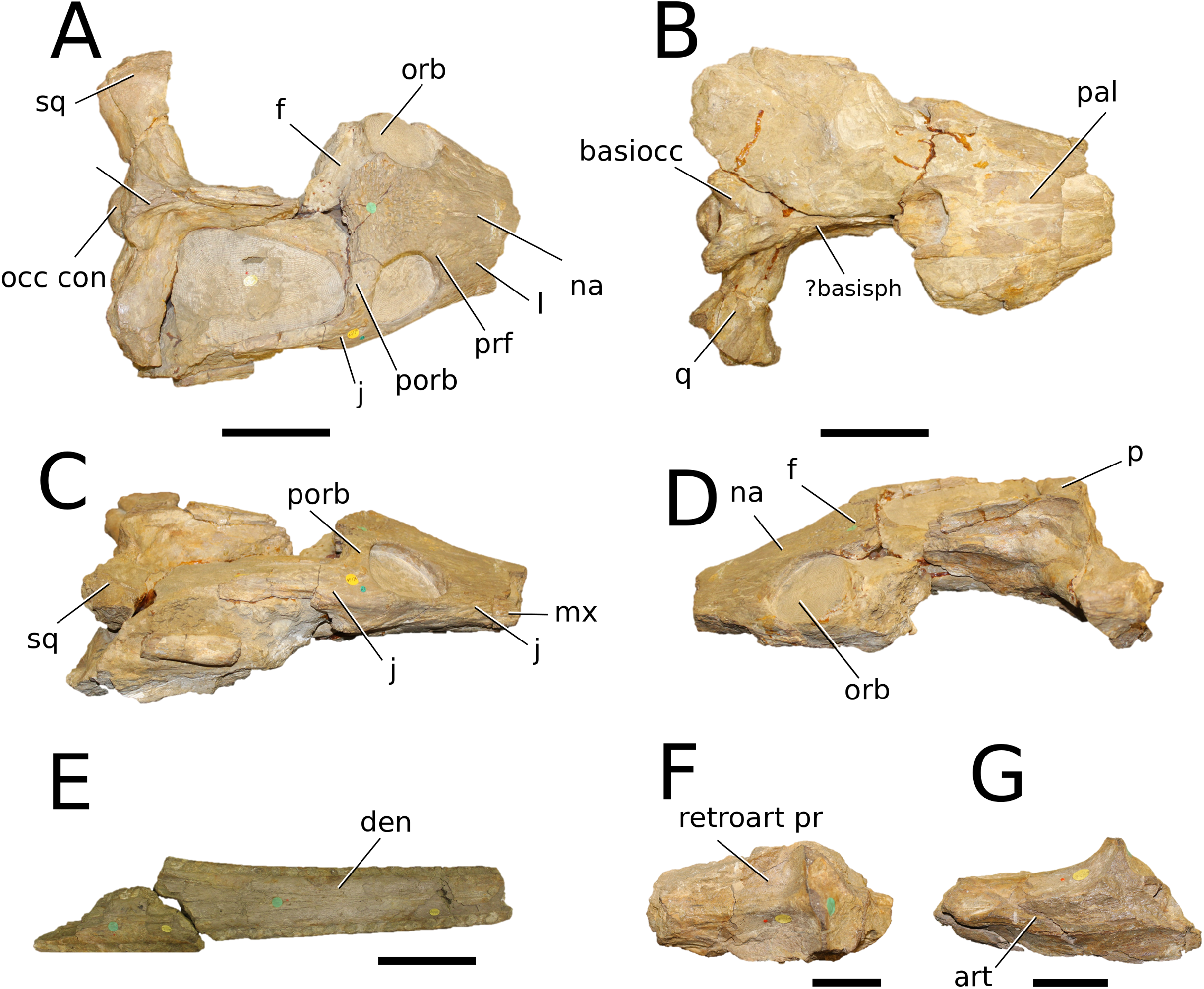
- Holotype skull

Scientific classification
- Kingdom: Animalia
- Phylum: Chordata
- Class: Reptilia
- Clade: Pseudosuchia
- Clade: Crocodylomorpha
- Suborder: †Thalattosuchia
- Family: †Machimosauridae
- Genus: †Clovesuurdameredeor; Johnson et al., 2020
- Species: †C. stephani

Binomial name
- †Clovesuurdameredeor stephani (Hulke, 1867)

Synonyms
- Steneosaurus stephani Hulke, 1867

= Clovesuurdameredeor =

Clovesuurdameredeor Temporal range: Bathonian, 168.3–166.1 Ma

Extinct genus of reptiles

Clovesuurdameredeor (meaning "sea creature of Closworth"; from the Medieval Latin Clovesuurda and the Old English meredeor) is an extinct genus of machimosaurid teleosauroid from the Bathonian Cornbrash Formation of England.

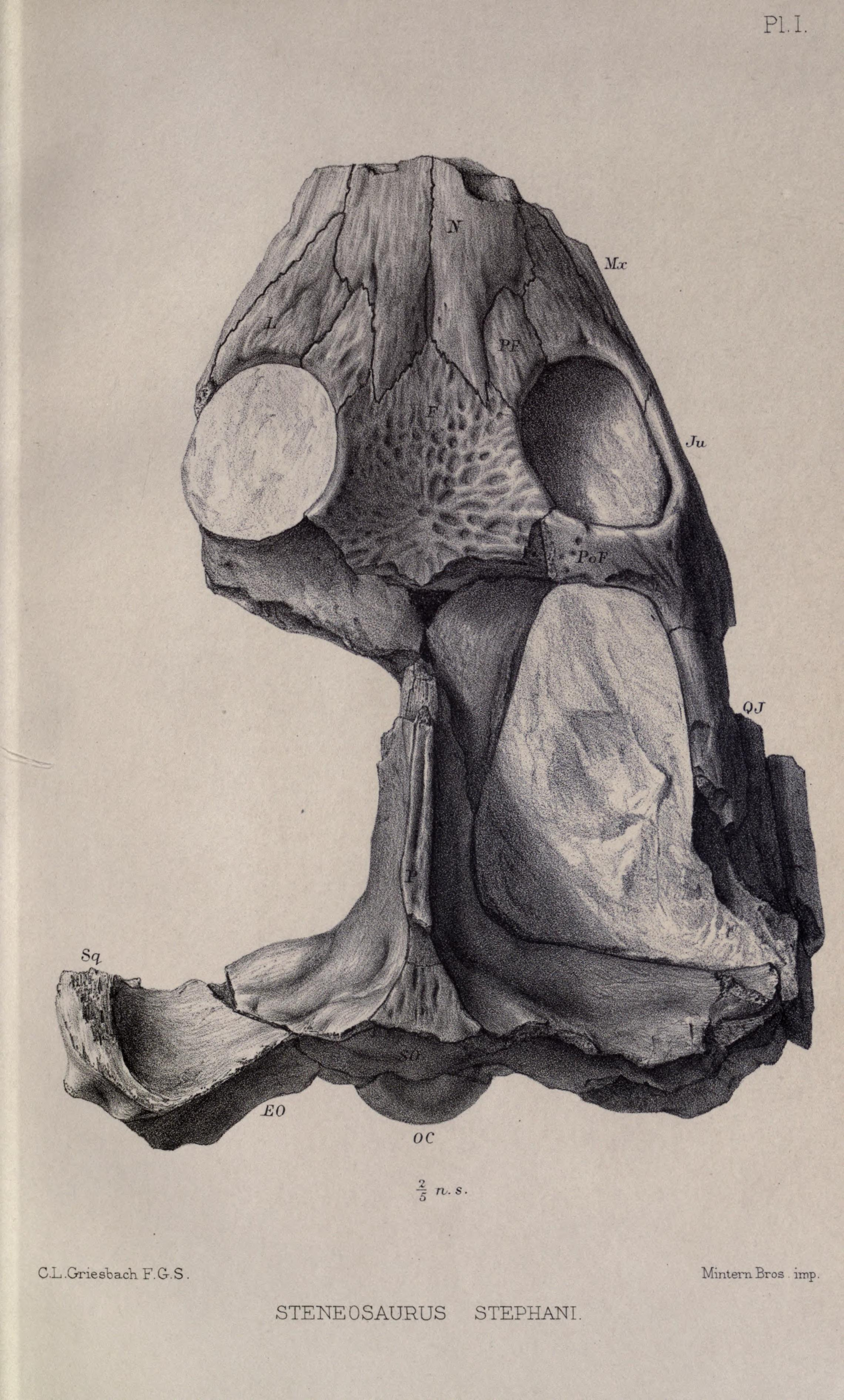
Illustration of the holotype

The type species, C. stephani, was originally named "Steneosaurus" stephani by Hulke in 1867. Vignaud (1995) considered S. stephani to be a minor synonym of Yvridiosuchus boutilieri (then still in the genus Steneosaurus), but Johnson (2019) and Johnson et al. (2020) discovered that S. stephani was a basal machimosaur that was separate from Yvridiosuchus, erecting the genus Clovesuurdameredeor for this.
