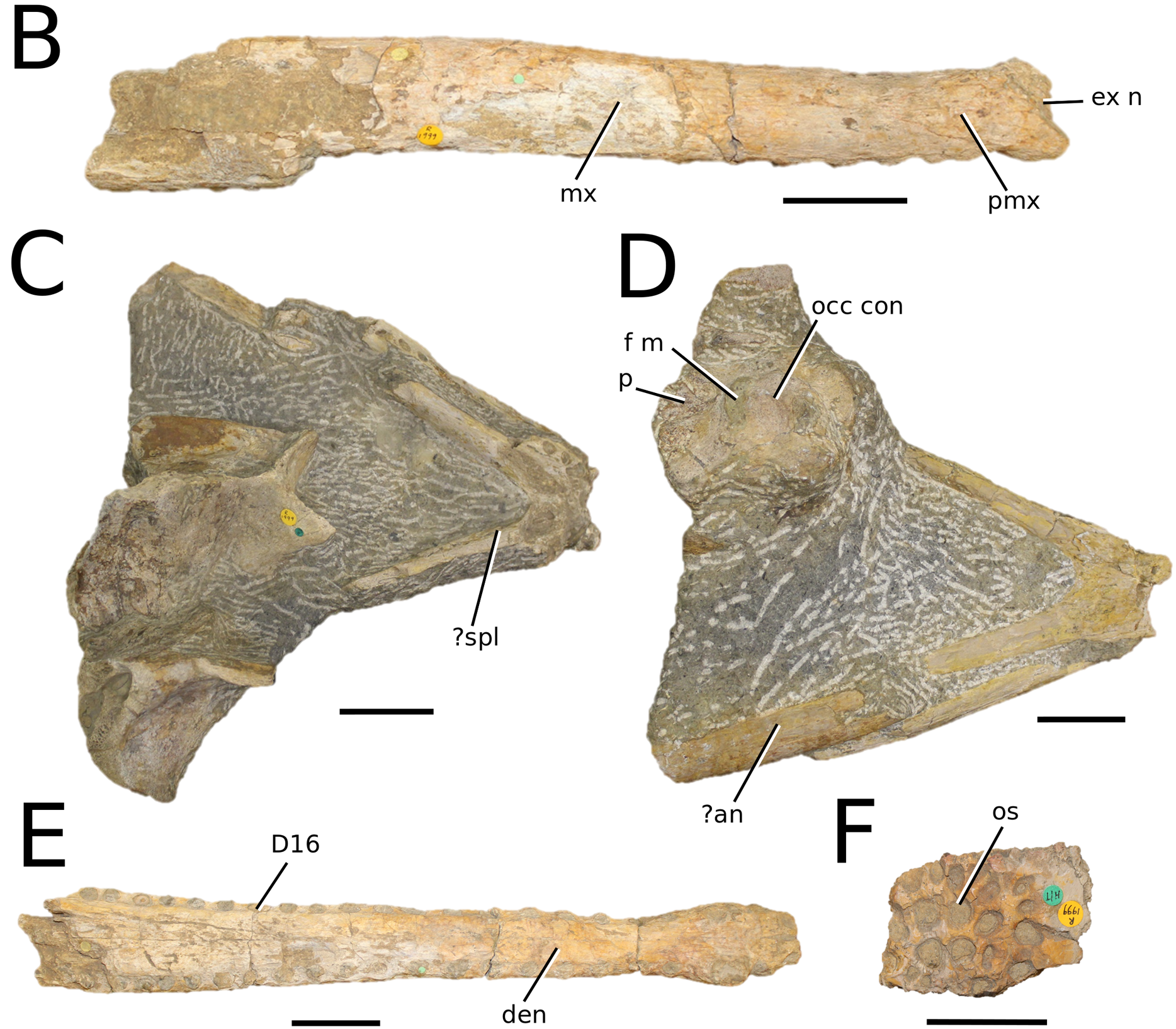
- Holotype (NHMUK PV R 1999) of A. baroni

Scientific classification
- Kingdom: Animalia
- Phylum: Chordata
- Class: Reptilia
- Clade: Archosauria
- Clade: Pseudosuchia
- Clade: Crocodylomorpha
- Suborder: †Thalattosuchia
- Family: †Machimosauridae
- Subfamily: †Machimosaurinae
- Genus: †Andrianavoay; Johnson et al., 2020
- Species: †A. baroni

Binomial name
- †Andrianavoay baroni (Newton, 1893)

= Andrianavoay =

Andrianavoay Temporal range: Bathonian ~168–166 Ma

Extinct genus of reptiles

Andrianavoay (meaning "noble crocodile" in Malagasy) is an extinct genus of teleosauroid from the Bathonian (in the Middle Jurassic) of Madagascar.

The type species, A. baroni, was originally named "Steneosaurus" baroni by ET Newton in 1893 on the basis of a partial skull listed as "NHMUK PV R 1999", and an associated osteoderm from Andranosamonta, Madagascar. In her unpublished 2019 thesis, Michela Johnson coined the nomen (ex dissertatione) Andrianavoay for S. baroni. The genus name was published in 2020.
