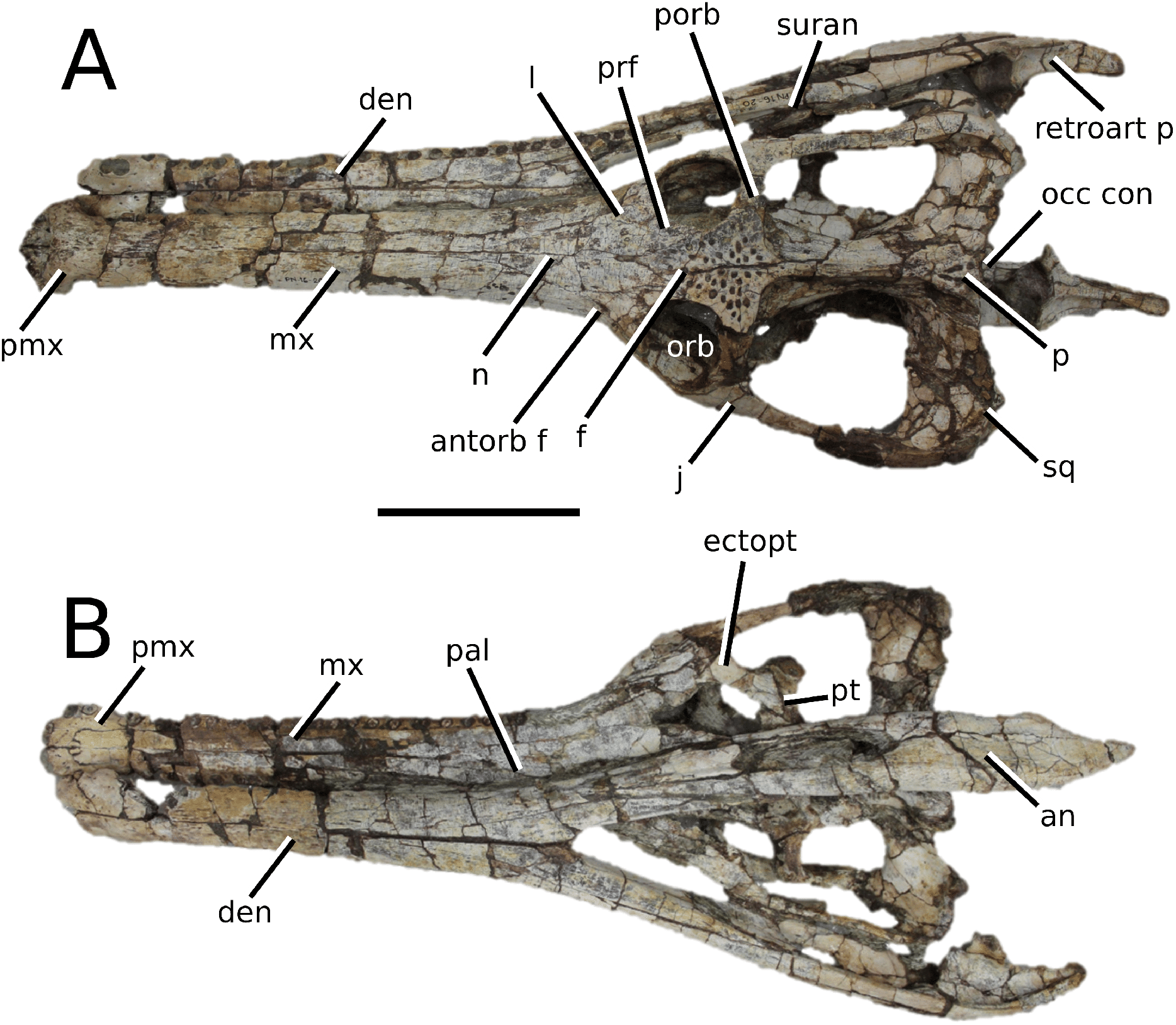
- Holotype skull of I. potamosiamensis

Scientific classification
- Kingdom: Animalia
- Phylum: Chordata
- Class: Reptilia
- Clade: Pseudosuchia
- Clade: Crocodylomorpha
- Suborder: †Thalattosuchia
- Family: †Teleosauridae
- Genus: †Indosinosuchus; Martin et al., 2019

Type species
- †Indosinosuchus potamosiamensis Martin et al., 2019

Species
- †I. kalasinensis? Johnson, Young & Brusatte, 2020; †I. potamosiamensis Martin et al., 2019; †I. peninsularensis Lauprasert et al., 2026

= Indosinosuchus =

Indosinosuchus Temporal range: Middle Jurassic - Late Jurassic ~Middle Jurassic–Tithonian ? Some studies have proposed an Early Cretaceous age for the Phu Kradung Formation

Extinct genus of reptiles

Indosinosuchus is a genus of teleosaurid crocodyliform that lived during the Late Jurassic or Early Cretaceous in what is now Thailand. There are at least two recognized species, the type species I. potamosiamensis from the lower Phu Kradung Formation and I. peninsularensis from the Khlong Min Formation. A third species has also previously been proposed based on a single skull from the Phu Kradung Formation, initially named Indosinosuchus kalasinensis, but a 2026 study has argued that this taxon was synonymous with Indosinosuchus potamosiamensis. It is unique among teleosauroids as the type species is the only named genus known from a freshwater environment, while most other members including I. peninsularensis are marine. Indosinosuchus is placed in the family Teleosauridae, but has a relatively robust skull that bears resemblance to members of the Machimosauridae. Biomechanical analysis of its mandible and teeth suggest that it would have had a substantial bite force comparable to animals like Lemmysuchus. Most known specimens of this genus were recovered from a single locality, which has been interpreted as a mass death site, possibly caused by a drought or flash flood. The precise age of Indosinosuchus is unclear, as the vertebrate fossils of the Phu Kradung Formation support a Late Jurassic age, while palynological data suggests an Early Cretaceous (Berriasian) age. The oldest remains from southern Thailand on the other hand suggest that the genus first appeared during the late Middle or early Late Jurassic.

== History and naming ==
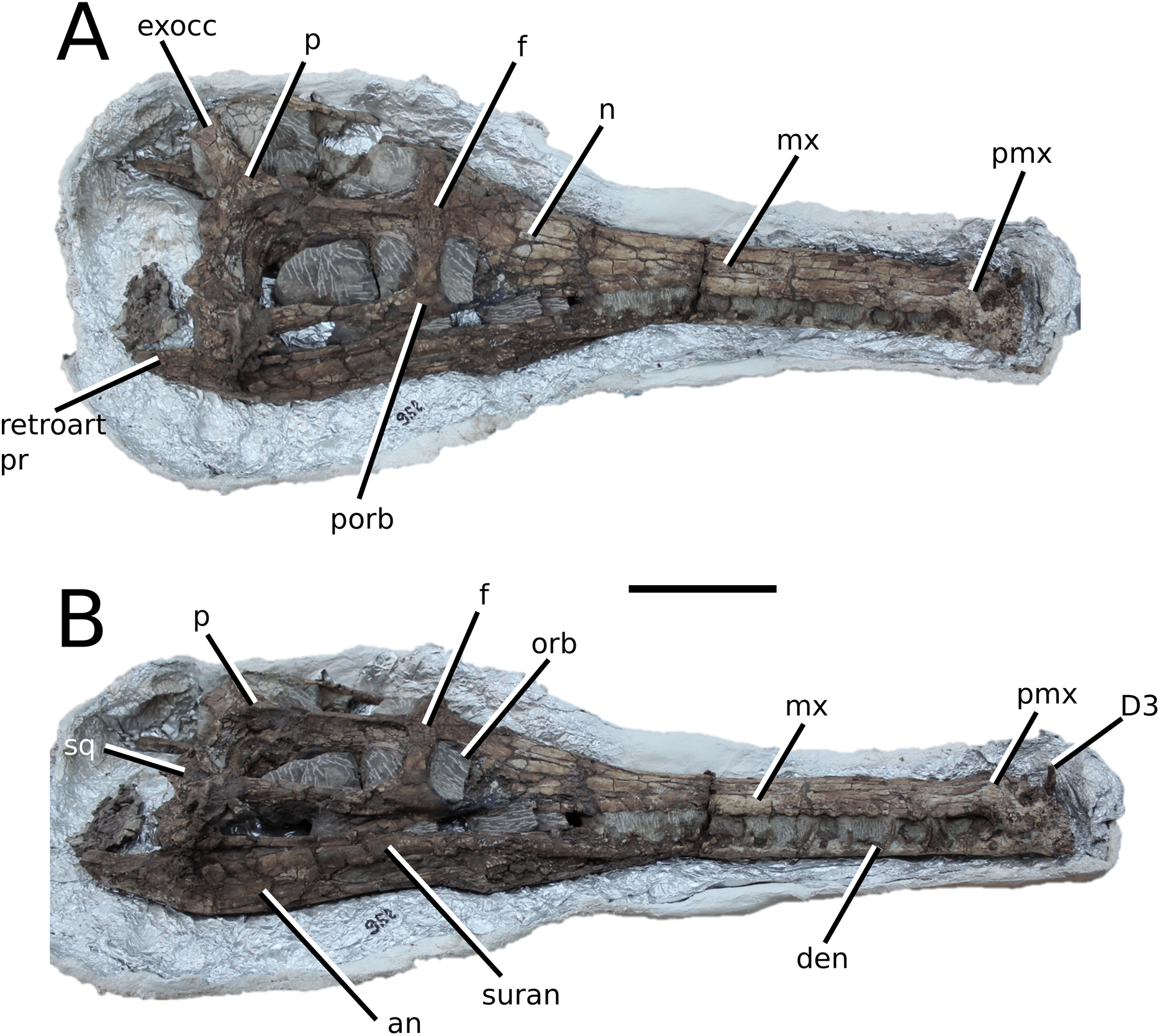
I. kalasinensis was proposed as a second species in 2020, but has since then been interpreted as a junior synonym of the type species

Fossil discoveries attributed to Indosinosuchus date as far back as the mid to late 2000s, with material having been collected from the Ban Nam Pun site of Thailand's Khlong Min Formation in 2004 and other remains having been found in the sediments of the Phu Noi locality, part of the Phu Kradung Formation, in 2008.

By 2019, when Martin and colleagues named Indosinosuchus potamosiamensis, ten individuals known from skull remains and various assorted postcranial fossils were known from the Phu Kradung Formation, all collected from Phu Noi. Of the material, specimen PRC-11 (a complete skull and mandible) was chosen as the holotype. Much of the referred material consists of skulls and mandibles, but also features a specimen that preserve femurs, vertebrae, osteoderms, parts of the shoulder girdle and pelvic girdle and even the fossils of a juvenile individual. While describing the Thai material, Martin and colleagues also considered the possibility that the remains belonged to the previously described Chinese teleosaur Peipehsuchus. However, they concluded that the holotype was said taxon was undiagnostic and the genus thus a nomen dubium, while the referred skull didn't match the fossils from Thailand. This cemented the decision that Indosinosuchus was a distinct genus of Asian teleosaur.

In their 2020 revision of teleosauroids, Johnson, Young and Brusatte also examined specimen PRC-239, which was among the various specimen referred to I. potamosiamensis. After comparing the fossil with the other material assigned to the species, they concluded that PRC-239 was anatomically distinct in several areas, enough to be the basis for a second species they named Indosinosuchus kalasinensis. However, this conclusion was eventually questioned in a 2026 study by Komsorn Lauprasert and colleagues as they described the teleosauroid material from Ban Nam Pun. By that point specimen PRC-239 had been completely prepared and removed from the plaster jacket that had previously encased part of the fossil. Following this, the team concluded that many of the features previously thought to distinguish Indosinosuchus kalasinensis from Indosinosuchus potamosiamensis were actually the result of post-mortem deformation caused by the process of preservation. Accordingly, Lauprasert and colleagues proposed that the former species was merely a synonym of the latter. Despite this, the study did not alter the number of Indosinosuchus species, as the team also found evidence that the Ban Nam Pun fossils represented a form referrable to Indosinosuchus but distinct on a species level, which they named Indosinosuchus peninsularensis.

The name Indosinosuchus is derived from the Indochinese tectonic block, which includes the area that is now Thailand, and "soukhos" (σοῦχος), Ancient Greek for crocodile. The species name of the type species, potamosiamensis, references the fact that the animal was found in freshwater deposits through the use of the Greek word for river. The species name also specifies its origin in Thailand, using the historical name Siam which is common in scientific names. The name of the possibly synonymous I. kalasinensis meanwhile comes from the Kalasin Province. Indosinosuchus peninsularensis was named for the fact that its remains come from the southern peninsular of Thailand rather than the country's north, where the other species has been found.

== Description ==
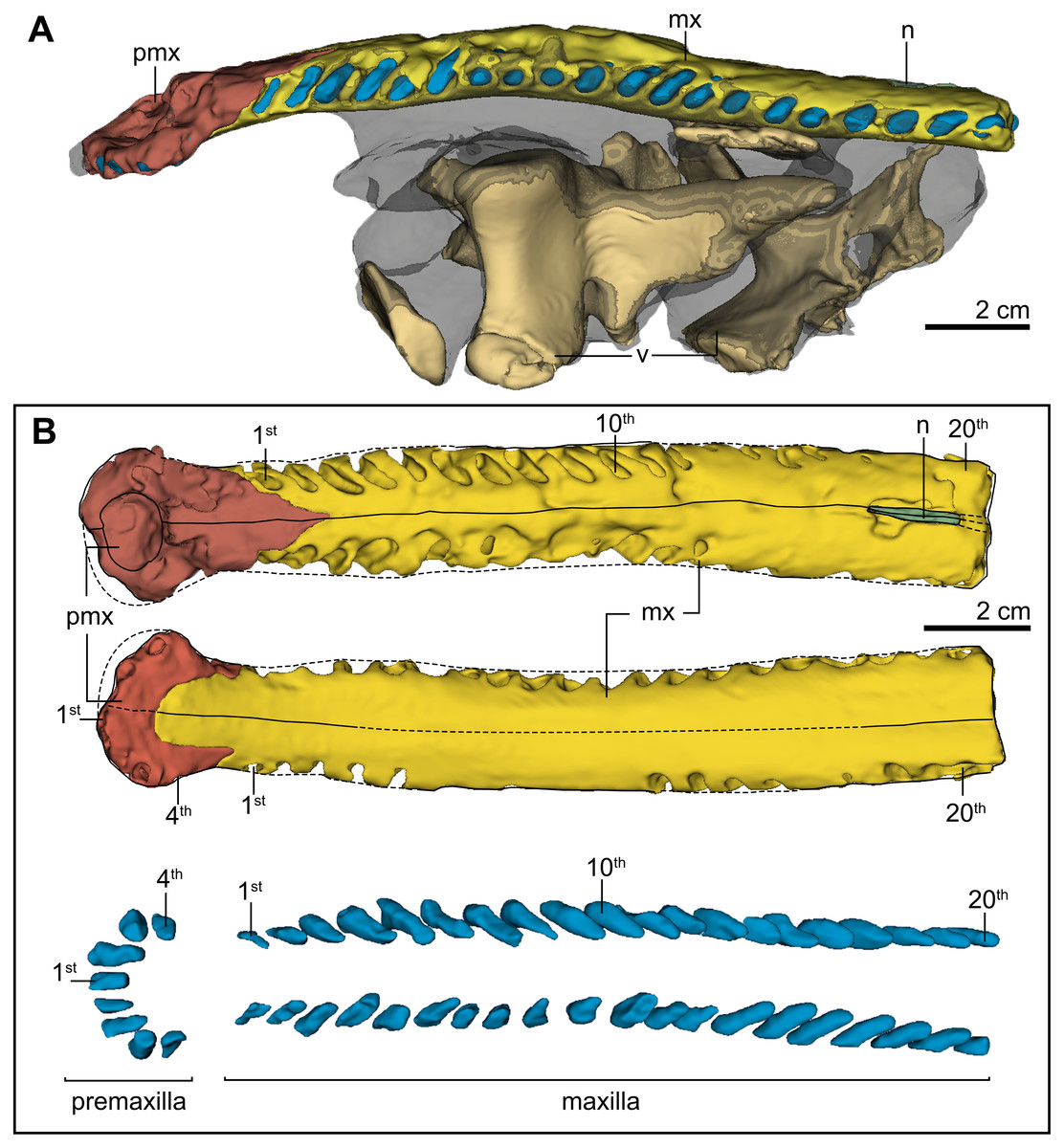
The snout of Indosinosuchus peninsularensis

Generally, all teleosaurs display a longirostrine skull shape, meaning their snouts are elongated and slender. However the degree of this elongation varies within the group, and with a rostrum to skull length ratio of 0.66 Indosinosuchus potamosiamensis falls into a group of teleosaurs with relatively short snouts compared to their relatives. This makes it similar to Mystriosaurus, Neosteneosaurus and Machimosaurus among others, which are considered mesorostrine rather than longirostrine by some authors. The tip of the snout, formed by the premaxillae, expands moderately to the side, which is a trait that varies between teleosaurs. Four teeth are situated in each premaxilla of I. potamosiamensis, organized into two closely spaced pairs, followed by 30 teeth in either of the only faintly ornamented maxillae and opposed by 31 dentary teeth. The tooth row is situated beneath the level of the occipital condyle, a trait diagnostic for the genus. All teeth are slender and conical in shape with a curved crown. Like in modern crocodiles, the teeth are organized in a matter that allows them to easily interlock. The space between the two pairs of maxillary teeth for instance gives room to the first tooth of the lower jaw, while the gap between the premaxillary and maxillary teeth is filled by the enlarged third and fourth caniniform dentary teeth. The incisive foramen, a small opening in the bottom of the premaxillae, connects to the maxillae and is positioned between two foramina. The nares open anteriorly, meaning directed towards the front of the skull and only slightly towards the top. The rims of the circular eye sockets are raised, giving them a somewhat telescopic appearance similar to modern gharials. Unlike gharials however, in which the eyes are directed purely upwards, the eyes of Indosinosuchus would be directed a little towards the sides as well. The supratemporal fenestrae are large, nearly twice as long as wide, taking up the majority of the skull table and with the front border running perpendicular to the midline of the skull.

The vertebral column shows no difference to that of other teleosauroids and although no specimen preserves both a femur and a humerus, the likely ratio between these two limb bones could be estimated based on their size proportional to the skull. Here too Indosinosuchus follows what is seen in its relatives, with a humerus to femur ratio of 0.63.

The osteoderm armor of Indosinosuchus follows the patterns typical for teleosaurs, with wider than long osteoderms in the trunk region and longer than wide, subrectangular osteoderms on the tail, all of which preserve a keel that runs from the front to the back. The osteoderm on the underside of the body are also longer than wide, but lack the keel and subsequently form a flat surface.

== Phylogeny ==
Over time multiple different phylogenies have included Indosinosuchus, recovering at times very different results. In the initial description by Martin and colleagues in 2019, Indosinosuchus was recovered as a close relative of the robust teleosauroid Machimosaurus hugii, with one analysis even recovering as sister taxa. The initial analysis was noted for causing a variety of problems with the stratigraphy and the effects this would have on teleosaur evolution, namely that Pelagosaurus was found to be nested deeply within teleosauroids as well, despite the fact that this taxon is commonly hypothesized to be a basal metriorhynchoid. A second, more exclusive analysis was conducted in an attempt to avoid this problem. Although the sister taxon relationship between Indosinosuchus and Machimosaurus was not recovered by this analysis, it still found that Indosinosuchus was a derived teleosaur close to Machimosaurus.

Only a year later, Johnson, Young and Brusatte published a major revision of Teleosauroidea with particular focus on the genus Steneosaurus, which had previously been a wastebasket taxon containing a wide array of unrelated teleosaurs. Although it was in this paper that I. kalasinensis was named as a second species of Indosinosuchus, none of the phylogenetic trees that were part of the study recovered the two species as actual sister taxa as was expected. In the most parsimonious tree using the extended implied weights method, I. kalasinensis was found to be the basalmost member of Teleosauridae while I. potamosinensis was notably more derived. Unlike in Martin's previous study, Indosinosuchus was not found to clade anywhere near Machimosaurus, with the two genera falling into entirely different families, the teleosaurids and the machimosaurids. The Bayesian analysis mirrors the split into teleosaurids and machimosaurids, but shows a much poorer resolved internal phylogeny for the former, finding teleosaurids split into multiple clades that together form a broad polytomy. Here too the Indosinosuchus species do not directly clade with one another, as I. potamosiamensis nested with the Chinese teleosauroid and Mystriosaurus, while I. kalasinensis stood on its own. Part of the reason for this lack of a recovered relationship could be the lack of material for I. kalasinensis and the fact that the two species do not preserve as much of the postcranial skeleton as their relatives.

- - Teleosauroidea
    - Plagiophthalmosuchus
    - - - Indosinosuchus kalasinensis
        - - - Chinese teleosauroid IVPP RV 10098
            - Mystriosaurus
          - - Indosinosuchus potamosiamensis
            - - - Teleosaurus
                - Platysuchus
              - - Mycterosuchus
                - - Aeolodon
                  - - Sericodon
                    - Bathysuchus
      - Machimosauridae

- - Teleosauroidea
    - Plagiophthalmosuchus
    - - - - Mycterosuchus
          - - Aeolodon
            - - Sericodon
              - Bathysuchus
        - Indosinosuchus kalasinensis
        - - Indosinosuchus potamosiamensis
          - - Chinese teleosauroid IVPP RV 10098
            - Mystriosaurus
        - - Teleosaurus
          - Platysuchus
      - Machimosauridae

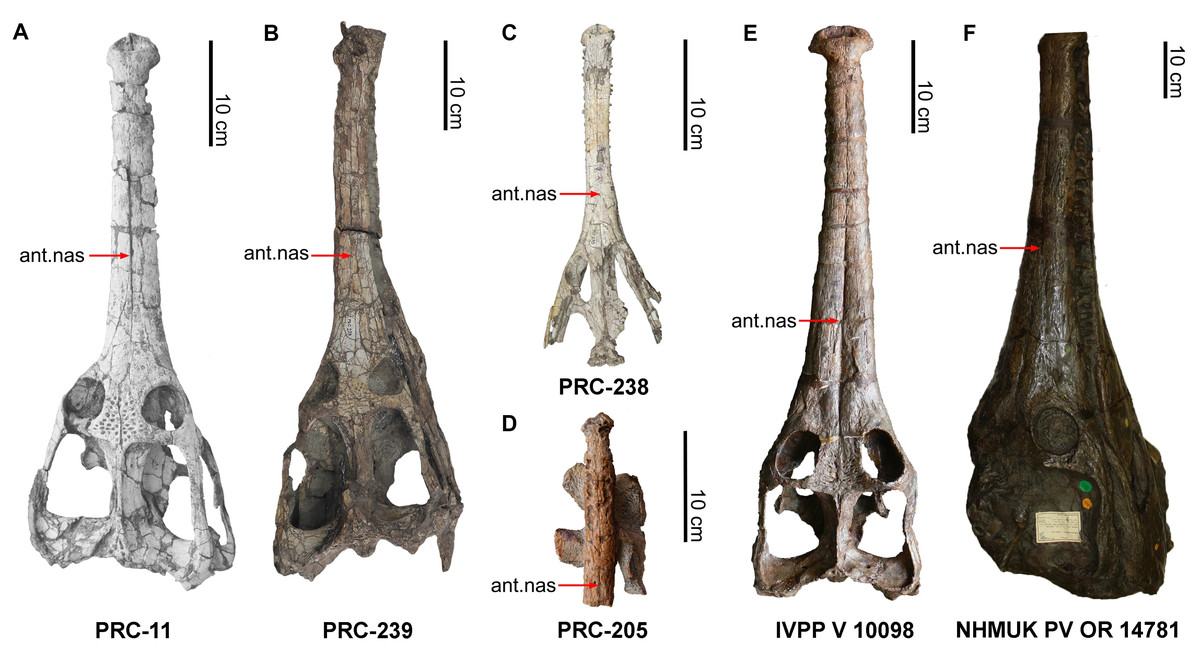
Recent phylogenies have repeatedly suggested that Indosinosuchus (A-D) was closely related to an unnamed Chinese teleosaurid (E) and the genus Mystriosaurus (F)

The close ties to Teleosaurus, Platysuchus and especially Mystriosaurus and the Chinese teleosauroid specimen IVPP RV 10098 were also recovered by later studies of the 2020s. In the description of the basal thalattosuchian Turnersuchus by Wilberg et al. (2023), Indosinosuchus potamosiamensis clades directly with the Chinese teleosauroid within a clade also containing Macrospondylus and Platysuchus. Since the phylogenetic analysis in this particular publication was based on Wilberg's 2019 dataset, Indosinosuchus kalasinensis was not included. The description of Indosinosuchus peninsularensis, which used the dataset established by Johnson and colleagues follows these trends. As in the 2020 study, Mystriosaurus clades with the Chinese teleosaurid with both Indosinosuchus species as the outgroup in a polytomy relative to this clade. Teleosaurus and Platysuchus are basal to all four.

- - Teleosauroidea
    - Plagiophthalmosuchus gracilirostris
    - - Teleosaurus cadomensis
      - - - - - Indosinosuchus potamosiamensis
              - IVPP RV 10098
            - - Platysuchus multiscrobiculatus
              - Macrospondylus bollensis
          - - "Steneosaurus" brevidens
            - Mystriosaurus laurillardi
        - - Charitomenosuchus leedsi
          - - Neosteneosaurus edwardsi
            - - Machimosaurus hugii
              - Machimosaurus buffetauti

- Teleosauroidea
  - Plagiophthalmosuchus
  - - - - Mycterosuchus
        - - Aeolodon
          - - Sericodon
            - Bathysuchus
      - - - Platysuchus
          - Teleosaurus
        - - Indosinosuchus potamosiamensis
          - Indosinosuchus peninsularensis
          - - Mystriosaurus
            - Chinese teleosaurid
    - other teleosauroids

== Paleobiology ==
=== Paleoecology ===
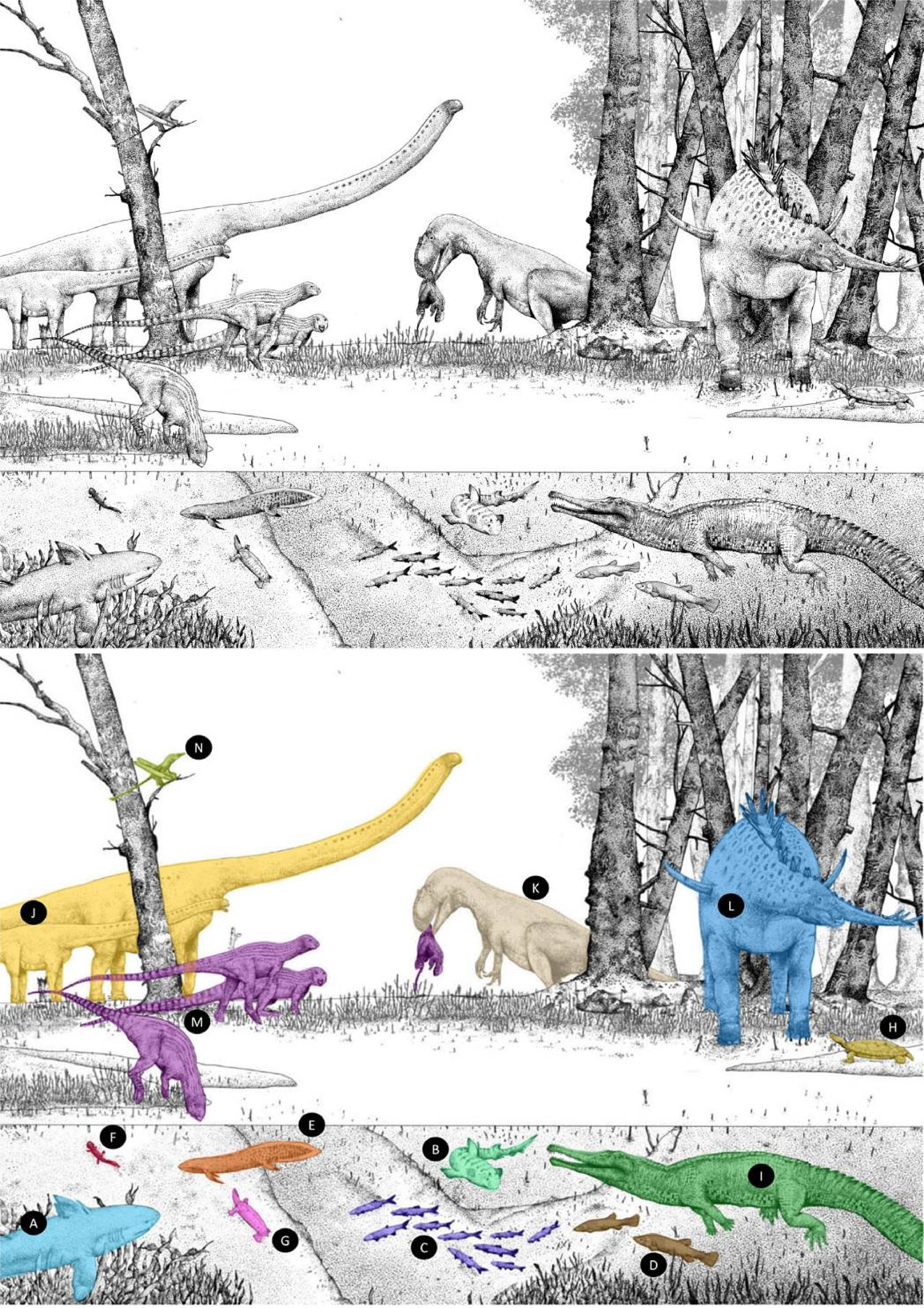
Phu Kradung Formation palaeoenvironment, I. potamosiamensis is I (green)

Traditionally, teleosaurs were split into up to six different ecological groups based on their general anatomy, including the overall shape of the cranium, tooth shape and at times anatomy of the postcrania. This included various degrees of specialisation within longirostrines, terrestrial ecomorphotypes, pelagic species and macrophages or durophages.

In 2022 Johnson and colleagues conducted a large scale principal component analysis, focusing on the teeth and the lower jaw of teleosaurs rather than the cranium and postcrania. Their study revealed several key adaptations of Indosinosuchus that show that these teleosaurs at least partially evolved convergently to machimosaurids, possessing relatively robust jaws with strong muscle attachments. The ratio between the length of the mandibular ramus and the mandibular symphysis, which is related to the animals ability to resist biomechanical forces and stress, is somewhat intermediate among members of Teleosauroidea. However, the length of the region where the lower jaw musculature attaches to is well developed and its length compared to that of the mandibular ramus indicates that Indosinosuchus potamosiamensis had a rather strong bite, easily comparable to some derived machimosaurids. The anterior mechanical advantage (aMa), which describes the amount of force that reaches the tip of the jaws, is very high in both Indosinosuchus species and among the highest in all of Teleosauroidea alongside that of many large machimosaurines. This is of particular importance to teleosaurs due to their fang-like front teeth. In addition to this, the posterior mechanical advantage (pMa) of I. potamosiamensis, which describes the overall maximum force along the toothrow, is the single highest among all teleosaurs. Another important biomechanic aspect is the opening mechanical advantage (oMa), which indicates how fast the jaws could be opened and closed. This value is generally inverse to the overall bite force, as smaller taxa are capable of biting more efficiently and with greater speed in order to catch prey. A higher value meanwhile indicates that the animal couldn't close its jaws as rapidly and instead relied on its strength to deal with prey. Here the two species of Indosinosuchus diverge. The study did find differences between I. potamosiamensis and the material at the time assigned to I. kalasinensis. The former was recovered as having an expectedly high opening mechanical advantage, the highest among teleosaurs, while the specimen attributed to I. kalasinensis had a relatively low oMa, giving it a much faster bite than. This was initially interpreted as two contemporary species having filled different ecological niches, but other research has argued that the two forms were not distinst and that the differences were merely a matter of post-mortem distortion of the skull.

Although their precise ecology remains generally unresolved, Johnson and colleagues conclude that Indosinosuchus was most likely a mesorostrine generalist species, showing no particular adaptations for going after large or armored prey like derived machimosaurs.

=== Paleoenvironment ===
While teleosaurs are generally considered to be marine animals, with the vast majority known from the waters of the western Tethys, Indosinosuchus potamosiamensis is among the few known teleosaurs confirmed to have been purely freshwater animals, alongside an as of yet unnamed taxon from China. The Phu Kradung Formation preserves what was once a floodplain dominated by lakes and rivers, which may have been subject to flooding and droughts. Specifically, the Phu Noi locality has been interpreted as representing an oxbow lake or the abandoned channel of one of the many meandering rivers of the region, given that the material was transported very little after the animal's deaths.

While the environment is well understood, the age of the Phu Kradung Formation is not as well known due to the lack of marine foraminifera or volcanic ash that could help in dating. To this come two contradictory hypothesis based on different methods. On the one hand, the general fauna of the formation better matches the Late Jurassic while dating using zircons and palynological data both point towards the Early Cretaceous. Another hypothesis combines the two, suggesting that the formation straddles the Jurassic-Cretaceous boundary, putting the Phu Noi locality and therefore Indosinosuchus into Tithonian strata. This would be congruent with the hypothesis that freshwater teleosaurs, which were dominant in the lower parts of the formation were replaced by goniopholids and pholidosaurids such as Chalawan thailandicus during the Cretaceous.

The part of the Khlong Min Formation that have yielded the fossils of Indosinosuchus peninsularensis on the other hand appears to represent a lagoonal environment with a closeby locality indicating shallow peritidal conditions above the fair weather wave base. This means that rather than being a freshwater animal as its northern relative, Indosinosuchus peninsularensis was a coastal marine animal, a habitat preference more similar to other teleosauroids. This species was furthermore older, dating to the late-Middle to early–Late Jurassic.

=== Mass death ===
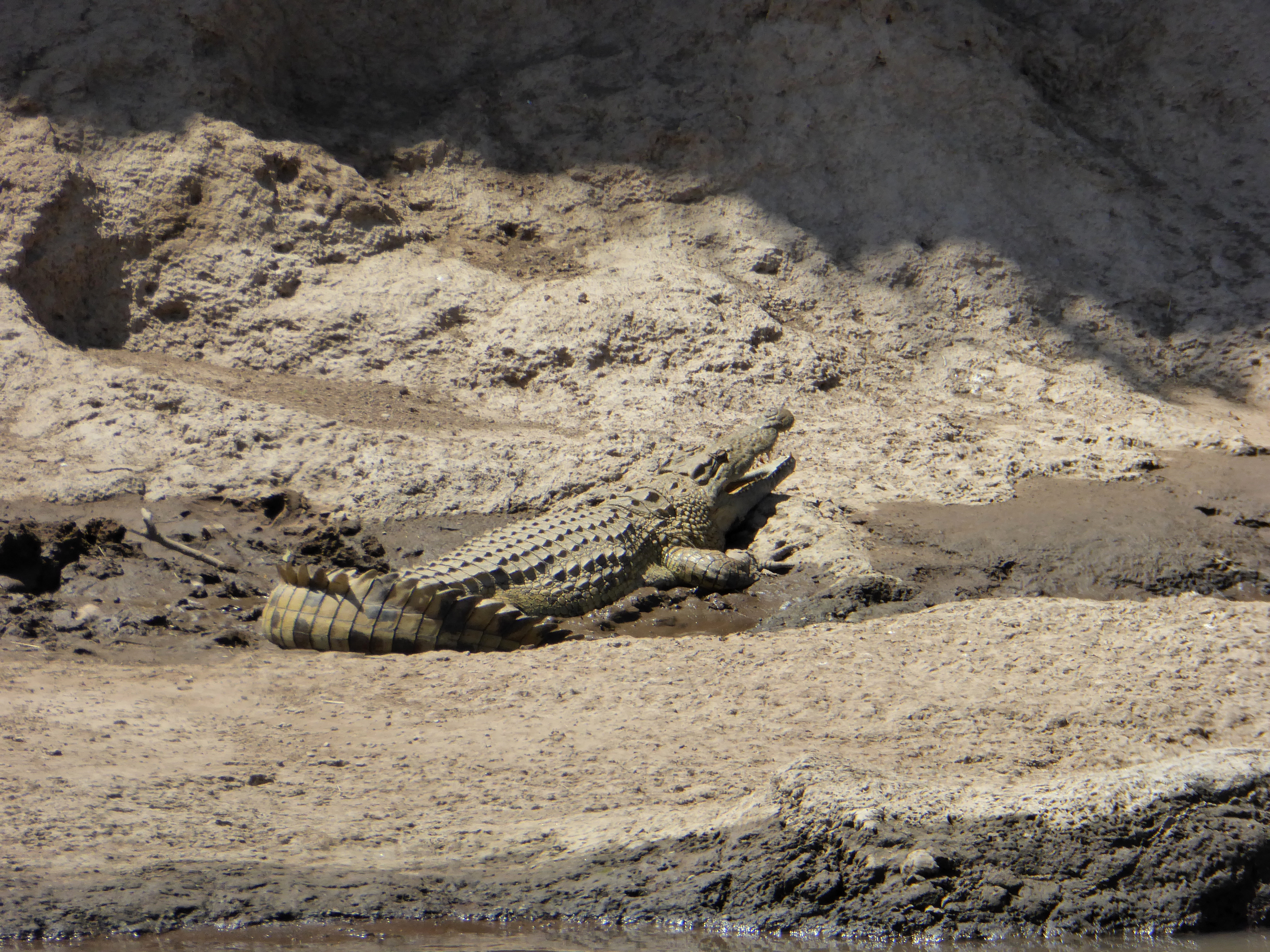
During droughts nile crocodiles are known to congregate in the muddy remains of waterbodies

The discovery of 10 Indosinosuchus specimen at Phu Noi, which cover different ages from juvenile to full mature, raises the question how the animals of that particular assemblage died. The material is not complete enough to indicate conditions similar to those that preserved the thalattosuchians of Holzmaden, which are known in their entirety thanks to the anoxic preservational environment. Limited transport and scavenging following their death would account for the partial but not full disarticulation of the bones. One specimen in particular, a nearly complete and still articulated vertebral column, could have been preserved when the bloated corpse of the animal floated on the water surface and lost its head, before undergoing rapid burial of the remaining body. Another hypothesis proposes that rather than rapid burial, it was the drying out of the carcass that caused its preservation. This is supported by marks left from the activity of dermestid beetles on some of the fossils, which would only be active in the dry season and require at least 8 weeks of dry conditions for their larvae to fully develop. Martin and colleagues suggest that the Phu Noi Indosinosuchus specimen congregated in a body of water during a major drought, something still seen in modern species of crocodilians. An ongoing drought could have depleted resources to the point that at least some of the now trapped teleosaurs died, eventually preserving them when their surroundings dried up entirely and allowing scavenging arthropods to access the carcasses. Alternatively, the animals may have died in a flash flood, their decomposition beginning while the waters were still receding but eventually leaving the carcasses stranded on dry land.
