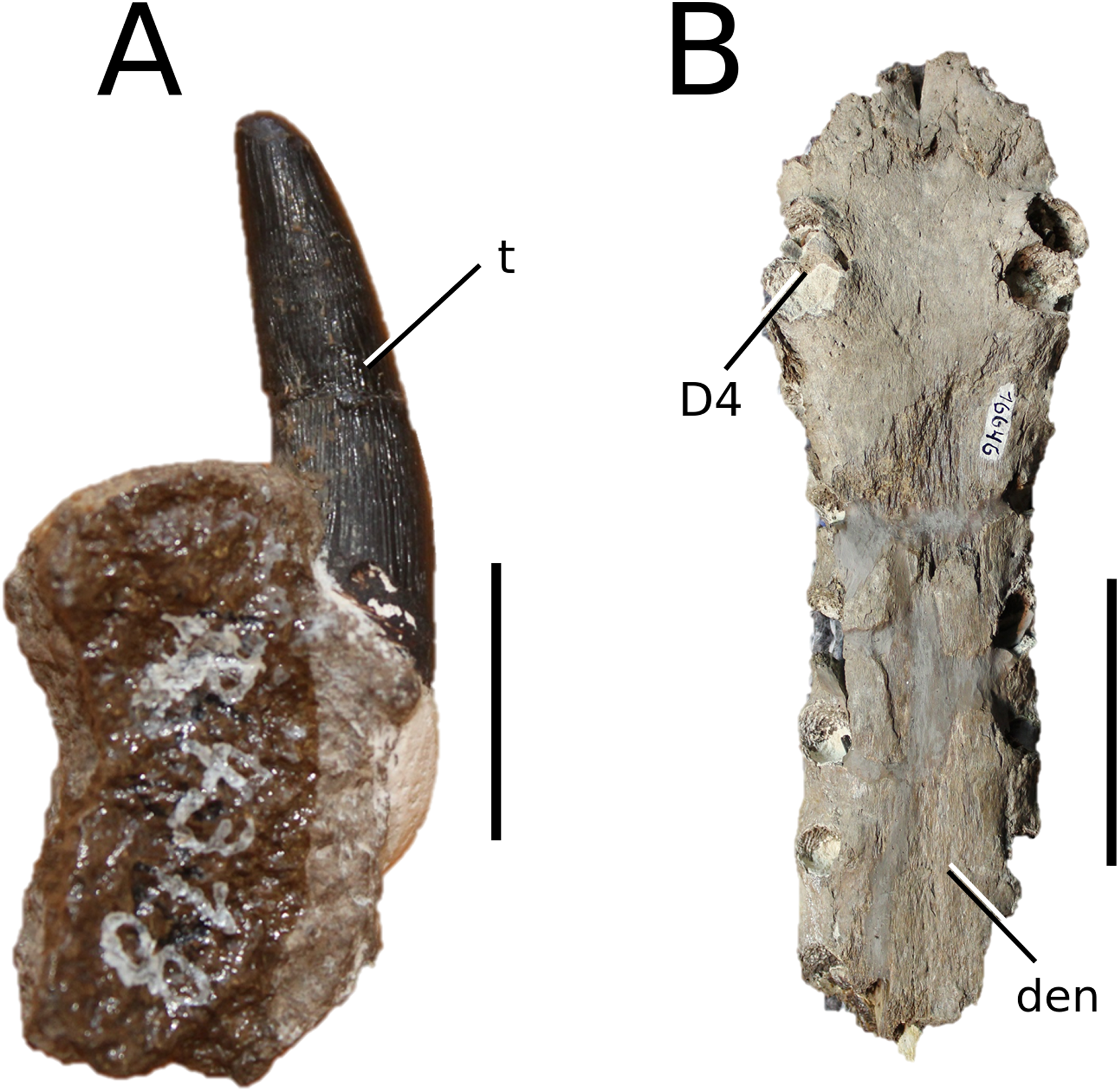
- Referred specimens SMF R 4318 (A) and LMH 16646 (B)

Scientific classification
- Kingdom: Animalia
- Phylum: Chordata
- Class: Reptilia
- Clade: Archosauria
- Clade: Pseudosuchia
- Clade: Crocodylomorpha
- Suborder: †Thalattosuchia
- Family: †Teleosauridae
- Subfamily: †Aeolodontinae
- Genus: †Sericodon von Meyer, 1845
- Species: †S. jugleri

Binomial name
- †Sericodon jugleri von Meyer, 1845

= Sericodon =

Sericodon Temporal range: Tithonian ~157–150 Ma

Extinct genus of reptiles

Sericodon is an extinct genus of teleosaurid crocodyliform from the Late Jurassic (Tithonian) of Germany and Switzerland. The genus contains a single species, S. jugleri. Sericodon was placed in 'Clade T' (Aeolodontinae) and was found to be the sister taxon to Bathysuchus, another teleosaurid.

== Taxonomy ==
Sericodon was named for teeth from Late Jurassic deposits in Hanover, Germany, and Solothurn, Switzerland (Reuchenette Formation) by Hermann von Meyer in 1845. The genus was later synonymized with Steneosaurus by Steel (1973), but new work suggests it might be a distinct genus after all.

In 2020 the genus was formally revived.

This simplified cladogram by Johnson et al. (2020) shows the updated location of Sericodon within Teleosauridae and Aeolodontinae:

- Thalattosuchia
  - Metriorhynchoidea
  - Teleosauroidea
    - Plagiophthalmosuchus
    - - Machimosauridae
      - Teleosauridae
        - Indosinosuchus kalasinensis
        - - - Chinese teleosauroid
            - Mystriosaurus
          - - Indosinosuchus potamosiamensis
            - - Teleosaurinae
                - Teleosaurus
                - Platysuchus
              - Aeolodontinae
                - Mycterosuchus
                - - Aeolodon
                  - - Sericodon
                    - Bathysuchus

== See also ==
- List of marine reptiles
