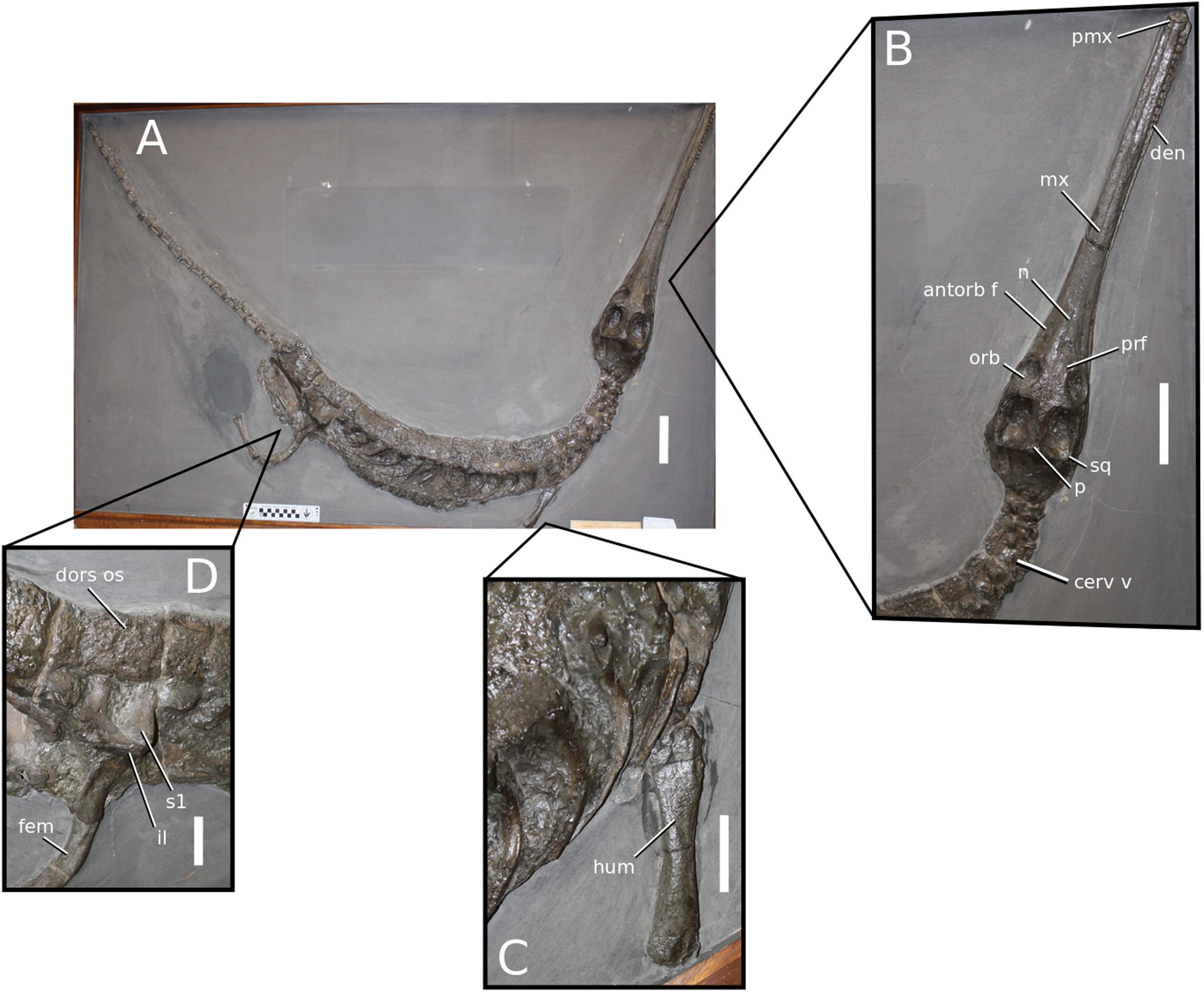
- Holotype skeleton, with close-ups of various areas

Scientific classification
- Kingdom: Animalia
- Phylum: Chordata
- Class: Reptilia
- Clade: Pseudosuchia
- Clade: Crocodylomorpha
- Suborder: †Thalattosuchia
- Parvorder: †Neothalattosuchia
- Superfamily: †Teleosauroidea
- Genus: †Plagiophthalmosuchus; Johnson et al., 2020
- Species: †P. gracilirostris

Binomial name
- †Plagiophthalmosuchus gracilirostris (Westphal, 1961)

Synonyms
- Steneosaurus gracilirostris Westphal, 1961

= Plagiophthalmosuchus =

Plagiophthalmosuchus Temporal range: Early Jurassic, ~Toarcian (Falciferum-Bifrons)

Genus of reptiles (fossil)

Plagiophthalmosuchus is an extinct genus of thalattosuchian crocodylomorph from the Early Jurassic (Early Toarcian) Whitby Mudstone Formation of Whitby, Yorkshire, UK, and Dudelange, Luxembourg. It contains the single species Plagiophthalmosuchus gracilirostris. In life, it was a small marine predator that would have fed on fish.

== History ==
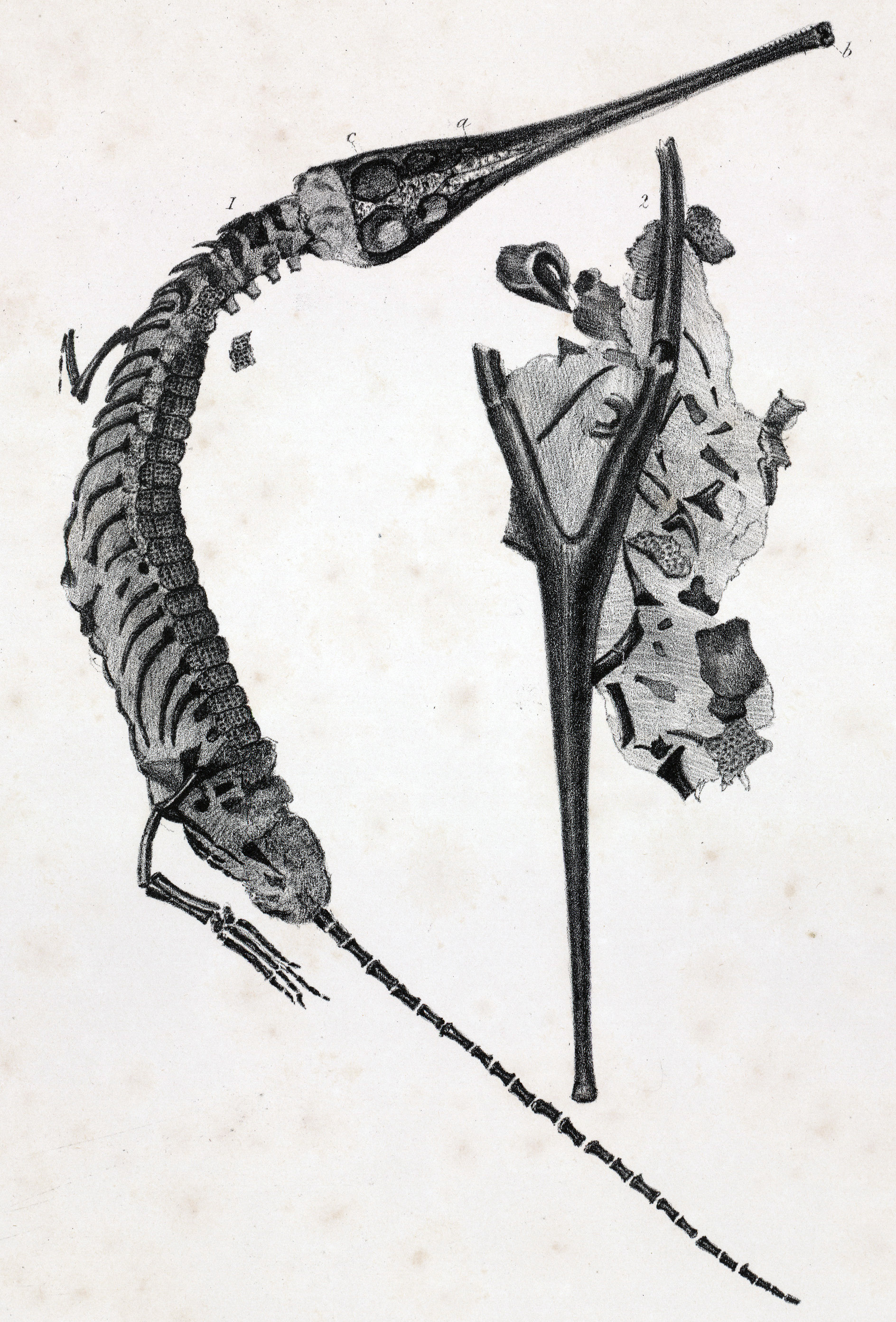
Lithograph of the holotype

The type species, P. gracilirostris, was originally named as a species of Teleosaurus in 1836, but then it was moved to the different genus Steneosaurus in 1961 Steneosaurus was used as a longtime wastebasket taxon for various teleosauroid specimens and had more than a dozen species. The type species, Steneosaurus rostromajor is undiagnostic, making the genus dubious and invalid. Additionally, many species of so-called "Steneosaurus" were found to be quite different and unrelated to one another, thus needing new generic names.

In 2020, Michela Johnson and colleagues reassigned "Steneosaurus" gracilirostris to the new genus Plagiophthalmosuchus, resulting in the new combination Plagiophthalmosuchus gracilirostris. The generic name translates to "lateral-eyed crocodile" in reference to the position of the animal's eyes on its skull.

== Classification ==
When Plagiophthalmosuchus was recognized as its own genus in 2020, it was found to be the most basal member of the group Teleosauroidea. Teleosauroids were a group of crocodylomorphs that were adapted for spending most of their lives out at sea. This group contains two main families, the more gracile and fish-eating Teleosauridae and the more macropredatory and robust Machimosauridae.

The cladogram below is from the 2020 analysis by Johnson and colleagues.

- Teleosauroidea
  - Plagiophthalmosuchus gracilirostris
  - - Teleosauridae
      - Indosinosuchus kalasinensis
      - - - Chinese teleosauroid (IVPP V 10098)
          - Mystriosaurus laurillardi
        - - Indosinosuchus potamosiamensis
          - - Teleosaurinae
              - Platysuchus multiscrobiculatus
              - Teleosaurus cadomensis
            - Aeolodontinae
              - Mycterosuchus nasutus
              - - Aeolodon priscus
                - - Sericodon jugleri
                  - Bathysuchus megarhinus
    - Machimosauridae
      - Macrospondylus bollensis
      - - Clovesuurdameredeor stephani
        - - Charitomenosuchus leedsi
          - - Seldsienean megistorhynchus
            - - Deslongchampsina larteti
              - Machimosaurinae
                - - cf. Proexochokefalos bouchardi
                  - Proexochokefalos heberti
                - - Neosteneosaurus edwardsi
                  - Andrianavoay baroni
                  - Machimosaurini
                    - Lemmysuchus obtusidens
                    - Yvridiosuchus boutilieri
                    - - Machimosaurus buffetauti
                      - - Machimosaurus mosae
                        - - Machimosaurus rex
                          - Machimosaurus hugii

A later study in 2024 by Mark Young and colleagues found Plagiophthalmosuchus to be outside of Teleosauroidea, instead as one of the most basal thalattosuchians.

- Thalattosuchia
  - Turnersuchus hingleyae
  - - Plagiophthalmosuchus gracilirostris
    - Neothalattosuchia
      - Teleosauroidea
        - Machimosauridae
        - Teleosauridae
      - Metriorhynchoidea
        - Pelagosaurus typus
        - - Teleidosaurus calvadosii
          - - - Metriorhynchoidea indet.
              - Magyarosuchus fitosi
            - - - "Pelagosaurus" tomarensis
                - Opisuchus meieri
              - - - Eoneustes bathonicus
                  - Eoneustes gaudryi
                - Euthalattosuchia
                  - Chile metriorhynchoid
                  - Zoneait nargorum
                  - Metriorhynchidae

== Ecology ==
Plagiophthalmosuchus had a slender body and an elongated, gracile snout lined with small, pointed teeth. Additionally, its jaws were adapted for producing a relatively weak but fast bite. The narrow snout and reduced bite force would have minimized water resistance and allowed precise, rapid strikes, while the tooth shape was suited for gripping rather than crushing. These features all together suggest that Plagiophthalmosuchus was adapted for catching and feeding on fish.
