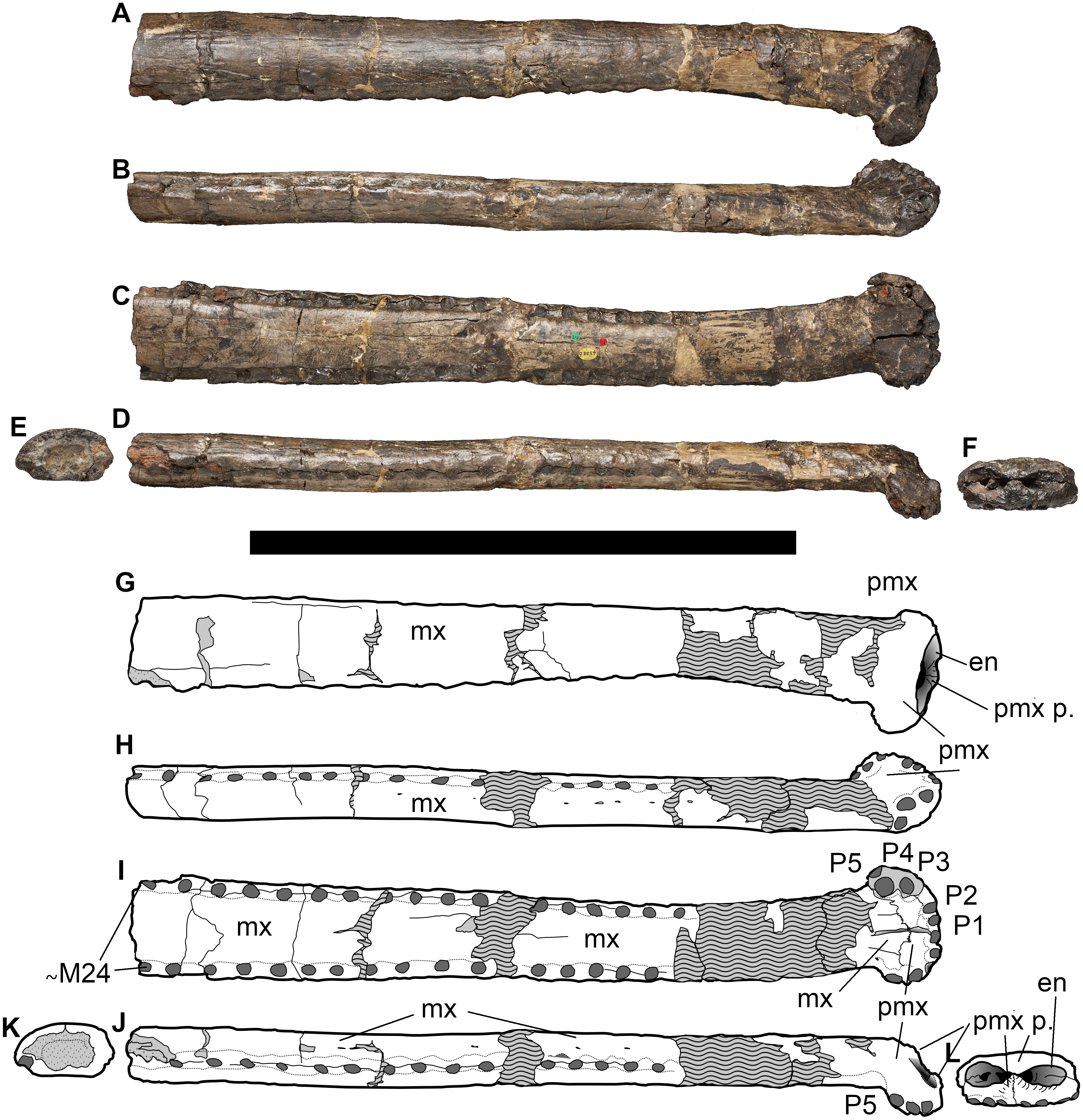
- Holotype rostrum

Scientific classification
- Kingdom: Animalia
- Phylum: Chordata
- Class: Reptilia
- Clade: Archosauria
- Clade: Pseudosuchia
- Clade: Crocodylomorpha
- Suborder: †Thalattosuchia
- Family: †Teleosauridae
- Subfamily: †Aeolodontinae
- Genus: †Bathysuchus; Foffa et al., 2019
- Species: †B. megarhinus

Binomial name
- †Bathysuchus megarhinus (Hulke, 1871)

= Bathysuchus =

Bathysuchus Temporal range: Kimmeridgian, 155–150 Ma

Extinct genus of reptiles

Bathysuchus ("deep water crocodile") is an extinct genus of teleosaurid thalattosuchian from Late Jurassic (Kimmeridgian) deep water marine deposits in England and France. Bathysuchus displays features that suggest it was more pelagic than other teleosaurids (along with its close relatives within the Aeolodontinae), including smoother skull bones and reduced armour plating, similar to the fully marine metriorhynchids. This was possibly an adaptation to rising sea levels during the Kimmeridgian, as its earlier relatives such as Teleosaurus were suited for shallow coasts and lagoon environments.

== Description ==
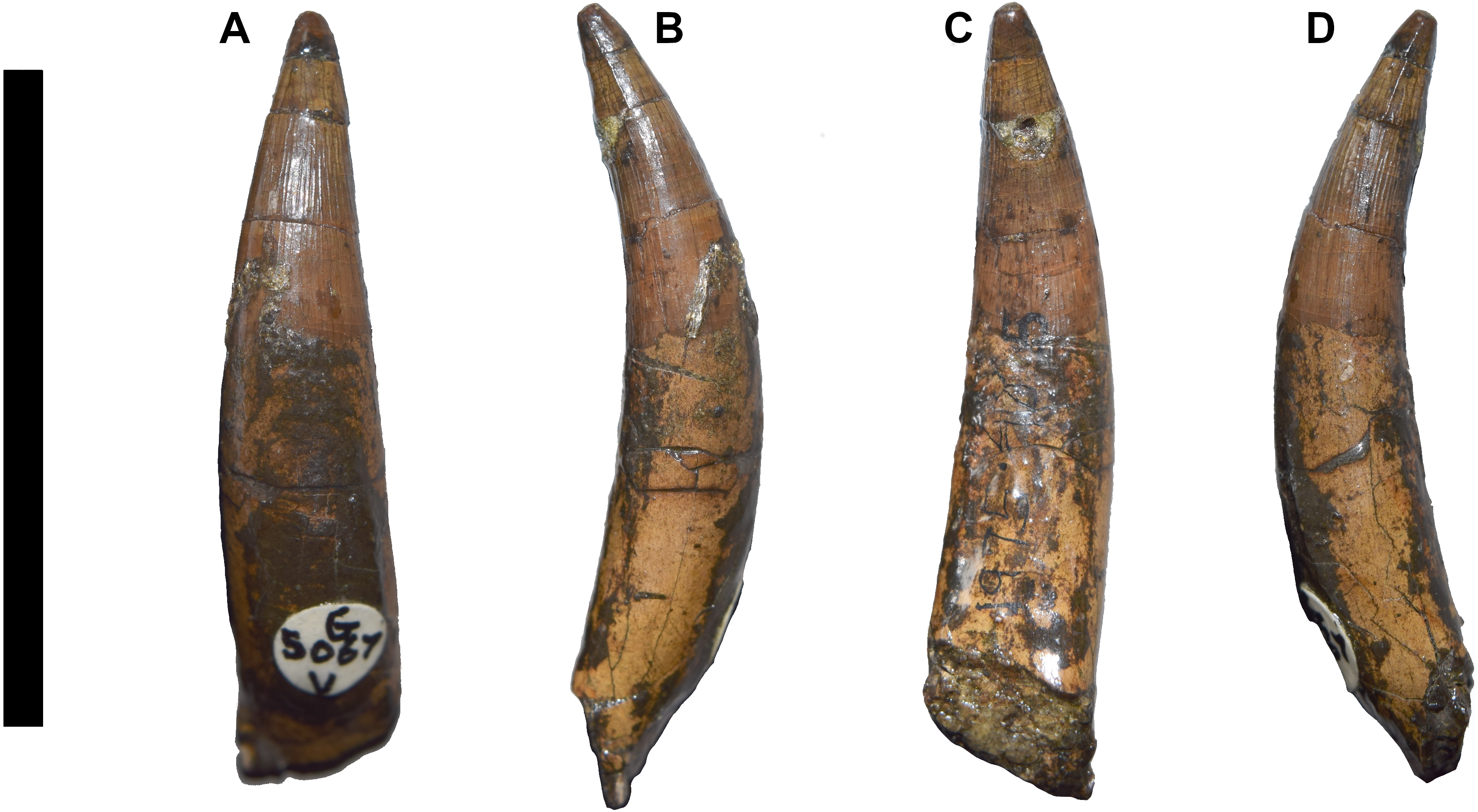
Assigned tooth

Bathysuchus is a very long-snouted (longirostrine) teleosaurid, currently known only from several snouts, the back of the skull, teeth, and a few osteoderms. It is distinguished from other derived teleosaurids in the following characteristics: strongly ventrally deflected anterior margin of the premaxilla; five premaxillary alveoli, the caudal-most being considerably reduced in size; anterodorsally oriented external nares; conical teeth bearing carinae which are only visible on the apical third of the crown. Other salient diagnostic characters can be found in the tooth count, shape of external nares (which is roughly '8'-shaped) and strong deflection of the premaxilla down and outwards.

The osteoderms of Bathysuchus are unlike those of other teleosaurids. Teleosaurid osteoderms are typically heavily ornamented with irregular or tear-drop shaped pits radiating in a starburst pattern, while those of Bathysuchus have small circular pits arranged in alternating rows (shared with Aeolodon). All but the single caudal osteoderm also lack keels. The osteoderms are also generally smaller and thinner than typical of teleosaurids.

== Discovery ==
Bathysuchus was originally described as a new species of Teleosaurus, T. megarhinus, by John Whitaker Hulke in 1871 on the basis of NHMUK PV OR 43086, an incomplete snout from the Kimmeridge Clay Formation of Kimmeridge Bay in Dorset, England. In his 1888 catalog of extinct reptiles and amphibians preserved in the Natural History Museum, Richard Lydekker referred it to Steneosaurus, as S. megarhinus. Delair (1958) did not accept the attribution of T. megarhinus to Steneosaurus, and a 2005 cladistic recovered the species as closer to Teleosaurus than to other species traditionally assigned to Steneosaurus. A preliminary report from 2015 indicated that "Steneosaurus" megarhinus is distinct from all other Middle-Late Jurassic teleosaurids and deserved its own genus. This study was followed up in 2019 by a re-description of all the specimens attributed to the species, which were assigned to a new distinct genus, Bathysuchus megarhinus.

The generic name Bathysuchus comes from the Ancient Greek βαθύς (bathus) for 'deep' and tσoῦχος (soûkhos) for 'crocodile', with the intended translation of "deep water crocodile", referring to its inferred lifestyle.

Three specimens are known for Bathysuchus: the holotype, NHMUK PV OR 43086, and DORCM G..5067i-v are both incomplete snouts from Kimmeridge Bay, Dorset, part of the deep water Kimmeridge Clay Formation. An additional skull from the slightly older Aulacostephanus eudoxus Sub-Boreal ammonite Zone of "La Crouzette", Francoulès, is known from Quercy, France.

== Classification ==
Bathysuchus has consistently been recognised as a teleosauroid thalattosuchian, although its affinities to Teleosaurus and Steneosaurus were only based on superficial features of the skull. The anatomical distinctiveness of Bathysuchus was recognised in 2019 by Foffa and colleagues through a thorough re-description of the known specimens. This also allowed them to include it in an updated phylogenetic analysis of thalattosuchians incorporating the newly recognised traits. Their analysis found Teleosauroidea to be split into two major groups, one containing Teleosaurus and other generally long-snouted genera that they referred to as 'clade T' (now Aeolodontinae), and another of Steneosaurus edwardsi, the durophagous Machimosaurini, and their closest relatives that they called 'clade S' (now Machimosaurini, Teleosauroidea and Teleosaurinae). Bathysuchus was found to be a member of 'clade T' most closely related to Sericodon, its sister taxon, and then Aeolodon; Foffa et al. (2019) initially believed that Bathysuchus was more closely related to Aeolodon than to Sericodon, but Johnson et al. (2020) have proven otherwise. Their results are shown simplified below:

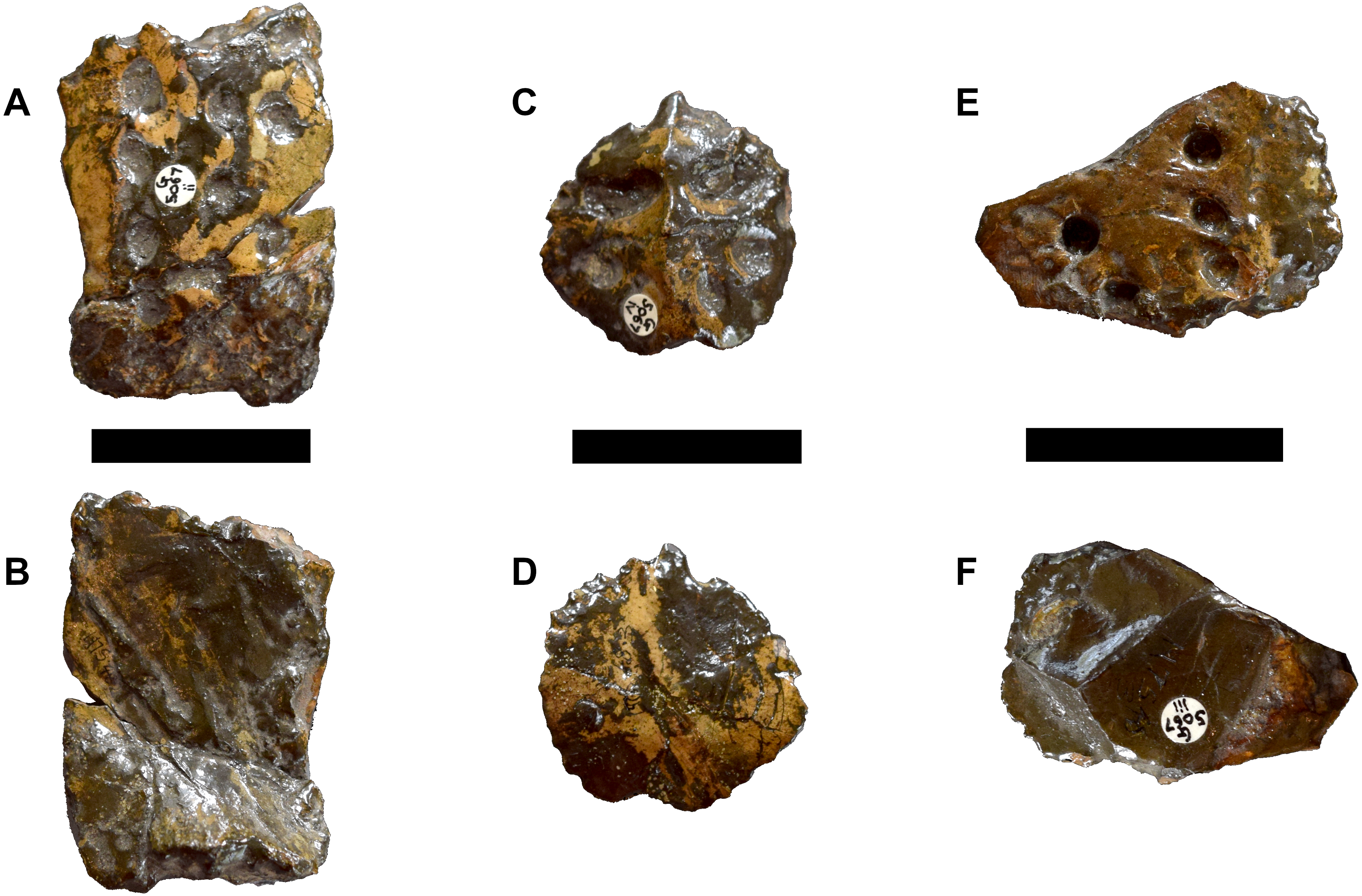
Assigned osteoderms

- Thalattosuchia
  - Metriorhynchoidea
  - Teleosauroidea
    - 'Steneosaurus' gracilirostris
    - - Clade T
        - - Mycterosuchus
          - - Aeolodon
            - Bathysuchus
        - - - Teleosaurus
            - Platysuchus
          - - Chinese teleosauroid
            - 'Steneosaurus' brevior
      - Clade S
        - 'Steneosaurus' bollensis
        - - 'Steneosaurus' leedsi
          - - 'Steneosaurus' larteti
            - - 'Steneosaurus' heberti
              - - Steneosaurus edwardsi
                - Machimosaurini
                  - Lemmysuchus
                  - - Machimosaurus buffetauti
                    - - Machimosaurus mosae
                      - - Machimosaurus rex
                        - Machimosaurus hugii

This simplified cladogram by Johnson et al. (2020) shows the updated location of Bathysuchus within Teleosauridae and Aeolodontinae:

- Thalattosuchia
  - Metriorhynchoidea
  - Teleosauroidea
    - Plagiophthalmosuchus
    - - Machimosauridae
      - Teleosauridae
        - Indosinosuchus kalasinensis
        - - - Chinese teleosauroid
            - Mystriosaurus
          - - Indosinosuchus potamosiamensis
            - - Teleosaurinae
                - Teleosaurus
                - Platysuchus
              - Aeolodontinae
                - Mycterosuchus
                - - Aeolodon
                  - - Sericodon
                    - Bathysuchus

== Palaeobiology ==
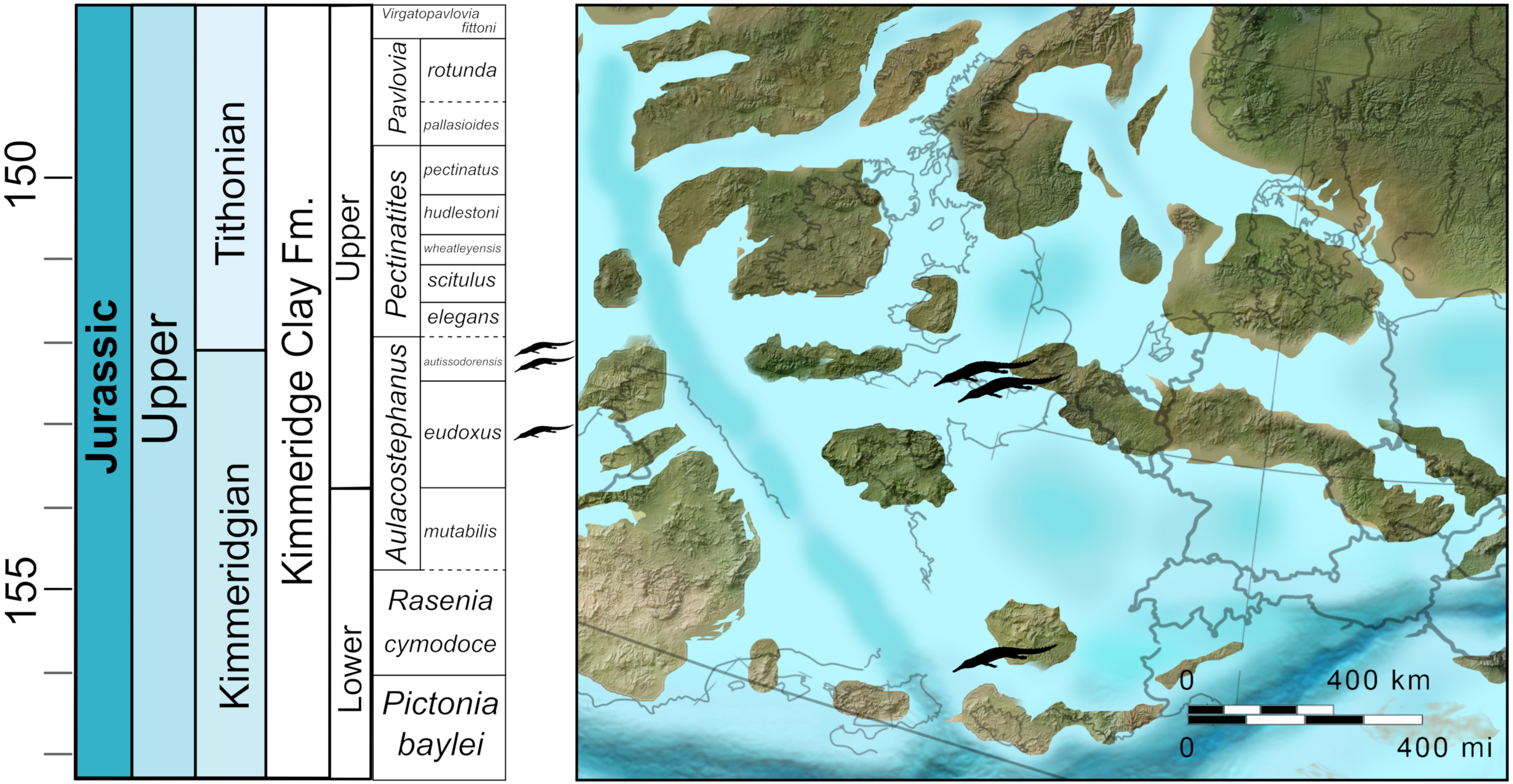
Stratigraphic and palaeogeographic distribution of Bathysuchus.

Bathysuchus was identified as sharing several characteristics with Aeolodon and metriorhynchids that suggest it was more pelagic than other teleosaurids. Anatomically, Bathysuchus shares with them the reduced ornamentation of the skull, as well as smaller, less sculpted osteoderms. It is unknown if it also had proportionately smaller limb bones, as known from its close relative Aeolodon. The reduction of the osteoderms in size and complexity is suggested to be related to thermoregulation, as the vascularised osteoderms of crocodylomorphs are thought to radiate heat into the body. In pelagic marine reptiles basking is not as necessary as the ambient water temperatures fluctuate less, and a similar shift may have occurred in the lineage leading to Bathysuchus and its relative Aeolodon that allowed them to reduce their osteoderm coverage.

The presence of Bathysuchus fossils in the Kimmeridge Clay is also significant, as this represents a deep water environment on the outer shelf with depths estimated to be around 150—200 metres, and was associated with deep water fauna including large pliosaurs, geosaurine metriorhynchids and ophthalmosaurid ichthyosaurs. This environment was part of the Jurassic Sub-Boreal Seaway, which was noted to show a decline in teleosaurid diversity across the Middle—Late Jurassic boundary as global sea levels rose. It's possible then that Bathysuchus and Aeolodon represent an attempt at shallow-water teleosaurids to adapt to a more pelagic lifestyle as the local environment changed, while other teleosaurids became restricted to the Tethys Ocean and the margins of continental Europe.
