= Ctenosuchus =

Ctenosuchus Temporal range: Middle Jurassic, Bathonian
- Holotype specimen

Scientific classification
- Kingdom: Animalia
- Phylum: Chordata
- Class: Reptilia
- Clade: Pseudosuchia
- Clade: Crocodylomorpha
- Suborder: †Thalattosuchia
- Family: †Teleosauridae
- Tribe: †Aeolodontini
- Genus: †Ctenosuchus; Imran et al., 2026
- Species: †C. tenuidens

Binomial name
- †Ctenosuchus tenuidens Imran et al., 2026

Genus of extinct crocodylomorph

Ctenosuchus (lit. 'comb crocodile') is an extinct genus of thalattosuchian crocodylomorph in the family Teleosauridae, known from the Middle Jurassic (Bathonian age) Anoual Formation of Morocco. The genus contains a single species, Ctenosuchus tenuidens, known from two specimens, both of which preserve partial skulls and osteoderms.

It is characterized by a unique arrangement of widely spaced, needle-like teeth unlike those of all other known crocodylomorphs. Other animals with a comparable dental morphology include mesosaurs (a group of stem reptiles), ctenochasmatid pterosaurs, and some fish (e.g., Atlantic needlefish, goblin shark, longnose gar, and some angler fishes). The interlocking teeth of Ctenosuchus may have been an adaptation for trapping prey, such as small crustaceans, fish, and soft-bodied animals.

C. tenuidens type locality near Talsint
