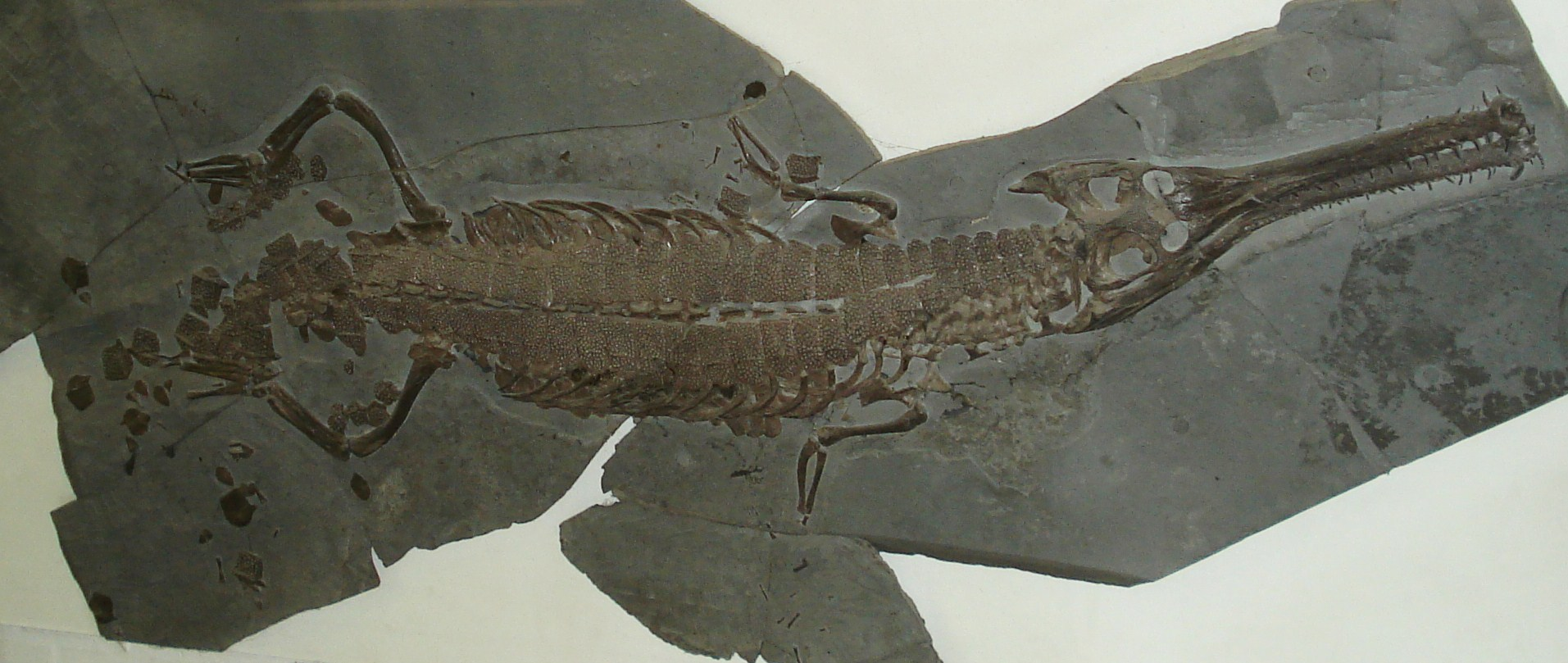
- Platysuchus multiscrobiculatus, Holzmaden Germany

Scientific classification
- Kingdom: Animalia
- Phylum: Chordata
- Class: Reptilia
- Clade: Pseudosuchia
- Clade: Crocodylomorpha
- Suborder: †Thalattosuchia
- Parvorder: †Neothalattosuchia
- Superfamily: †Teleosauroidea
- Family: †Teleosauridae; Geoffroy, 1831

Subgroups
- †Indosinosuchus; †Mystriosaurus; †Seldsienean?; †Teleosaurinae Geoffroy, 1831; †Platysuchus; †Teleosaurus; †Aeolodontini Johnson et al., 2022; †Aeolodon; †Bathysuchus; †Ctenosuchus; †Mycterosuchus; †Sericodon

Synonyms
- Mystriosauri Fitzinger, 1843; Mystriosauridae Fitzinger, 1843; Steneosauridae Owen, 1843

= Teleosauridae =

Teleosauridae Temporal range: Jurassic (Toarcian–Tithonian), 183–145 Ma

Extinct family of reptiles

Teleosauridae is a family of extinct typically marine crocodylomorphs similar to the modern gharial that lived during the Jurassic period. Teleosaurids were thalattosuchians closely related to the fully aquatic metriorhynchoids, but were less adapted to an open-ocean, pelagic lifestyle. The family was originally coined to include all the semi-aquatic (i.e. non-metriorhynchoid) thalattosuchians and was equivalent to the modern superfamily Teleosauroidea. However, as teleosauroid relationships and diversity was better studied in the 21st century, the division of teleosauroids into two distinct evolutionary lineages led to the establishment of Teleosauridae as a more restrictive family within the group, together with its sister family Machimosauridae.

Amongst teleosauroids, teleosaurids were generally smaller and less common than machimosaurids, suggesting the two families occupied different niches, similar to modern species of crocodilians. However, teleosaurids were more diverse than machimosaurids, with generalist coastal predators (Mystriosaurus), long-snouted marine piscivores (Bathysuchus), and potentially even long-snouted, semi-terrestrial predators (Teleosaurus). Additionally, teleosaurids occupied a wider range of habitats than machimosaurids, from semi-marine coasts and estuaries, the open-ocean, freshwater, and potentially even semi-terrestrial environments.

== Classification ==
Teleosauridae is phylogenetically defined in the PhyloCode by Mark T. Young and colleagues as "the largest clade within Teleosauroidea containing Teleosaurus cadomensis but not Machimosaurus hugii. Teleosauridae is split into two subfamilies, the Teleosaurinae and the Aeolodontini, the former defined in the PhyloCode as "the largest clade within Teleosauroidea containing Teleosaurus cadomensis, but not Aeolodon priscus and the latter defined in the PhyloCode as "the largest clade within Teleosauroidea containing Aeolodon pricus, but not Steneosaurus megistorhynchus (the genus Seldsienean) and Teleosaurus cadomensis.

- Thalattosuchia
  - Metriorhynchoidea
  - Teleosauroidea
    - Plagiophthalmosuchus
    - - Machimosauridae
      - Teleosauridae
        - Indosinosuchus kalasinensis
        - - - Chinese teleosauroid
            - Mystriosaurus
          - - Indosinosuchus potamosiamensis
            - - Teleosaurinae
                - Teleosaurus
                - Platysuchus
              - Aeolodontini
                - Mycterosuchus
                - - Aeolodon
                  - - Sericodon
                    - Bathysuchus

In 2024, Mark Young and colleagues recovered the genus Seldsienean as a teleosaurid and as the sister taxon to the tribe Aeolodontini. They suggested that this clade should be one of the main subfamilies of Teleosauridae, although they left this clade unnamed.

- Teleosauroidea
  - Machimosauridae
  - Teleosauridae
    - - Mystriosaurus laurillardi
      - - Indosinosuchus potamosiamensis
        - Chinese teleosauroid (IVPP V 10098)
    - - Teleosaurinae
        - Platysuchus multiscrobiculatus
        - Teleosaurus cadomensis
      - "Unnamed clade"
        - Seldsienean megistorhynchus
        - Aeolodontini
          - Mycterosuchus nasutus
          - - Aeolodon priscus
            - - Sericodon jugleri
              - Bathysuchus megarhinus

== Palaeobiology ==
Teleosaurids were originally regarded as marine analogues to modern gharials, as they both typically share long, tubular snouts and narrow teeth. However, differences in the jaws, teeth, and skeleton of different teleosaurids suggest that they were more ecologically diverse than this. Earlier teleosaurids were coastal semi-aquatic generalists, while the two subfamilies were more specialised. Teleosaurines appear to have been semi-terrestrial, as they were more heavily armoured and had forward-facing nostrils. In contrast, aeolodontines have been found in deep marine waters and had reduced armour, implying that they were open water predators similar to metriorhynchoids (although the oldest aeolodontine, Mycterosuchus, appears to have been semi-terrestrial, similar to teleosaurines).

== Palaeoecology ==
=== Distribution ===
Definitive fossils of teleosaurids are largely restricted to Laurasia, with material found in Europe (England, France, Germany, Italy, Portugal, Russia and Switzerland) and Asia (China and Thailand, and possibly India). Some fossils are known from Gondwana, including Ctenosuchus from Morocco.

== See also ==
- List of marine reptiles
