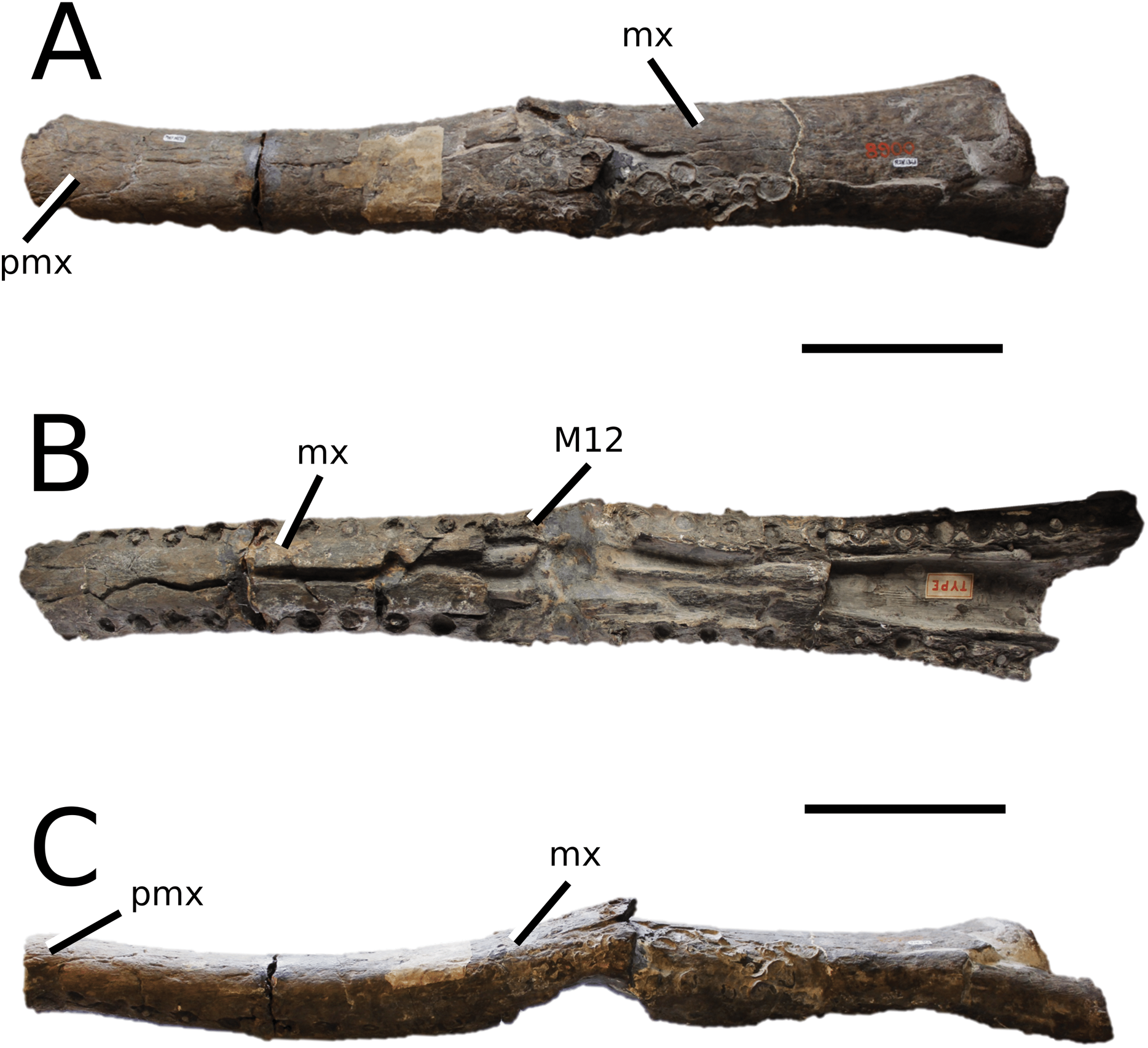
- Lectotype snout

Scientific classification
- Kingdom: Animalia
- Phylum: Chordata
- Class: Reptilia
- Clade: Archosauria
- Clade: Pseudosuchia
- Clade: Crocodylomorpha
- Suborder: †Thalattosuchia
- Superfamily: †Teleosauroidea
- Genus: †Steneosaurus; Geoffroy, 1825

Type species
- †Steneosaurus rostromajor Geoffroy, 1825

Synonyms
- Synonyms of Steneosaurus: Leptocranius Bronn, 1837; Synonyms of S. rostromajor: Gavialis bacheleti; Steneosaurus longirostris

= Steneosaurus =

Steneosaurus Temporal range: Middle or Late Jurassic ~Callovian or Lower Oxfordian

Extinct genus of reptiles

Steneosaurus (from Greek: στενός stenós, 'narrow' and Greek: σαῦρος saûros, 'lizard') is a dubious genus of teleosaurid crocodyliform from the Middle or Late Jurassic (Callovian or early Oxfordian) of France and possibly also India. The genus has been used as a wastebasket taxon for thalattosuchian fossils for over two centuries, and almost all known historical species of teleosauroid have been included within it at one point. The genus has remained a wastebasket, with numerous species still included under the label 'Steneosaurus', many of which are unrelated to each other (either paraphyletic or polyphyletic with respect to each other and other genera of teleosauroids).

== Discovery and assigned species ==
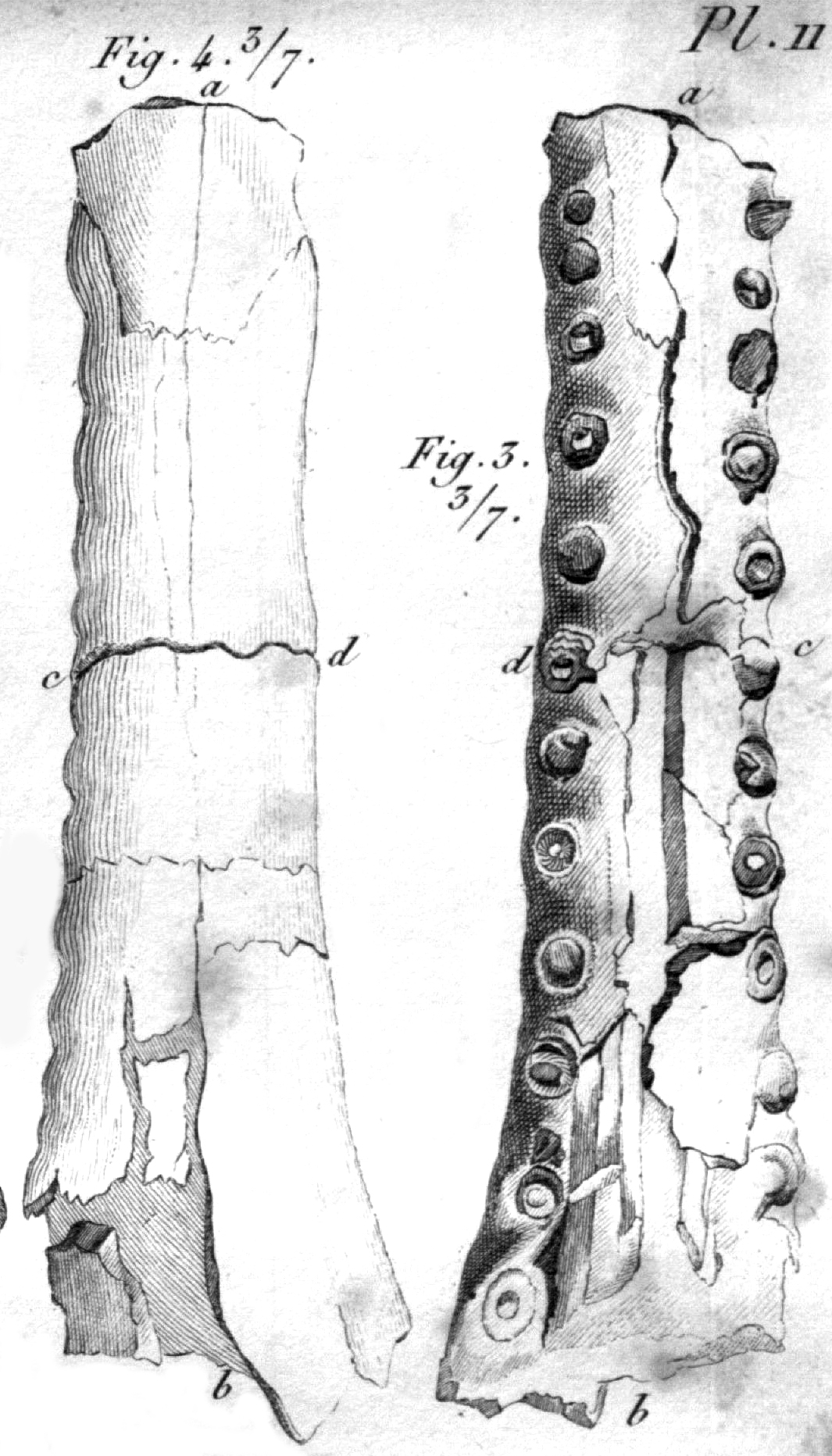
Front part of the lectotype snout as figured by Georges Cuvier in 1808

The type species, S. rostromajor, was only formally recognised as such in 2020, and this revision determined the type specimen of Steneosaurus was undiagnostic, and so declared the genus Steneosaurus a nomen dubium. The history of this specimen has been detailed in 2017. It was discovered in three pieces by abbot Charles Bacheley (1716-1795) in the Vaches Noires near Villers-sur-Mer (Calvados, France). Bacheley offered these pieces to Alexandre Besson (1725-1809) who had built up an important cabinet of fossils and minerals in Paris. Besson gave one of the pieces (the posterior portion) to Barthélémy Faujas de Saint-Fond (1741-1819), professor of geology in the Muséum national d'Histoire naturelle, Paris. Georges Cuvier first illustrated in 1808 the two anterior pieces of the specimen kept in the Besson collection and then figured the third piece (posterior portion from the Faujas de Saint-Fond collection) in 1824 in association with the anterior pieces (Besson collection) and other cranial remains belonging to Metriorhynchidae.

The large skulls of two marine crocodiles, about 1,602 millimetres (1.602 m) in length, were found in the Chari Formation, India and have been putatively identified as Steneosaurus by Phansalkar et al. (1994).

The remaining species referred to Steneosaurus thus require new generic names, and some species have already been assigned to new genera prior to Steneosaurus being declared a nomen dubium.

Species in this genus are traditionally classed into two skull groups: longirostrine (long, narrow jaws) and mesorostrine (slightly shorter jaws).

Longirostrine

- 'S.' atelestatus Eudes-Deslongchamps, 1868 - Oxfordian Marnes de Villers of France
- 'S.' blumembachi Eudes-Deslongchamps, 1868 - Oxfordian Marnes de Villers of France
- 'S.' oplites Eudes-Deslongchamps, 1863 - Toarcian La Caine-Curcy of France
- 'S.' rudis Sauvage, 1874 - France

=== Reassigned species ===
- 'Steneosaurus' baroni Newton, 1893 = Andrianavoay
- 'Steneosaurus' bollensis Von Meyer, 1830 = Macrospondylus
- 'S.' bouchardi - Sauvage, 1872 = Proexochokefalos
- 'Steneosaurus' boutilieri Eudes-Deslongchamps, 1869 = Yvridiosuchus
- 'Steneosaurus' brevior Blake, 1876 = Mystriosaurus
- 'Steneosaurus' deslongchampsianus (Lennier, 1887)
- 'Steneosaurus' edwardsi (Eudes-Deslongchamps, 1868) = Neosteneosaurus
- 'Steneosaurus' gracilirostris (Westphal, 1961) = Plagiophthalmosuchus
- 'Steneosaurus' heberti Morel de Glasville, 1876 = Proexochokefalos
- 'Steneosaurus' larteti (Eudes-Deslongchamps, 1868) = Deslongchampsina
- 'Steneosaurus' leedsi (Andrews, 1909) = Charitomenosuchus
- 'Steneosaurus' megarhinus (Hulke, 1871) = Bathysuchus
- 'Steneosaurus' megistorhynchus (Geoffrey Saint-Hilaire in Eudes-Deslongchamps, 1869) = Seldsienean
- 'Steneosaurus' obtusidens Andrews, 1909 = Lemmysuchus

== Classification ==
A 2005 phylogenetic analysis into the evolutionary relationships of Thalattosuchia did not support the monophyly of Steneosaurus, as the genera Machimosaurus and Teleosaurus both fell within Steneosaurus. Reinforcing the paraphyly of Steneosaurus, the Callovian species "Steneosaurus" obtusidens has been recovered as the sister species of Machimosaurus in recent cladistic analyses of Thalattosuchia and renamed Lemmysuchus, while 'Steneosaurus' bollensis was recovered in a basal position to other members of Steneosaurus sensu lato.

== See also ==
- List of marine reptiles
