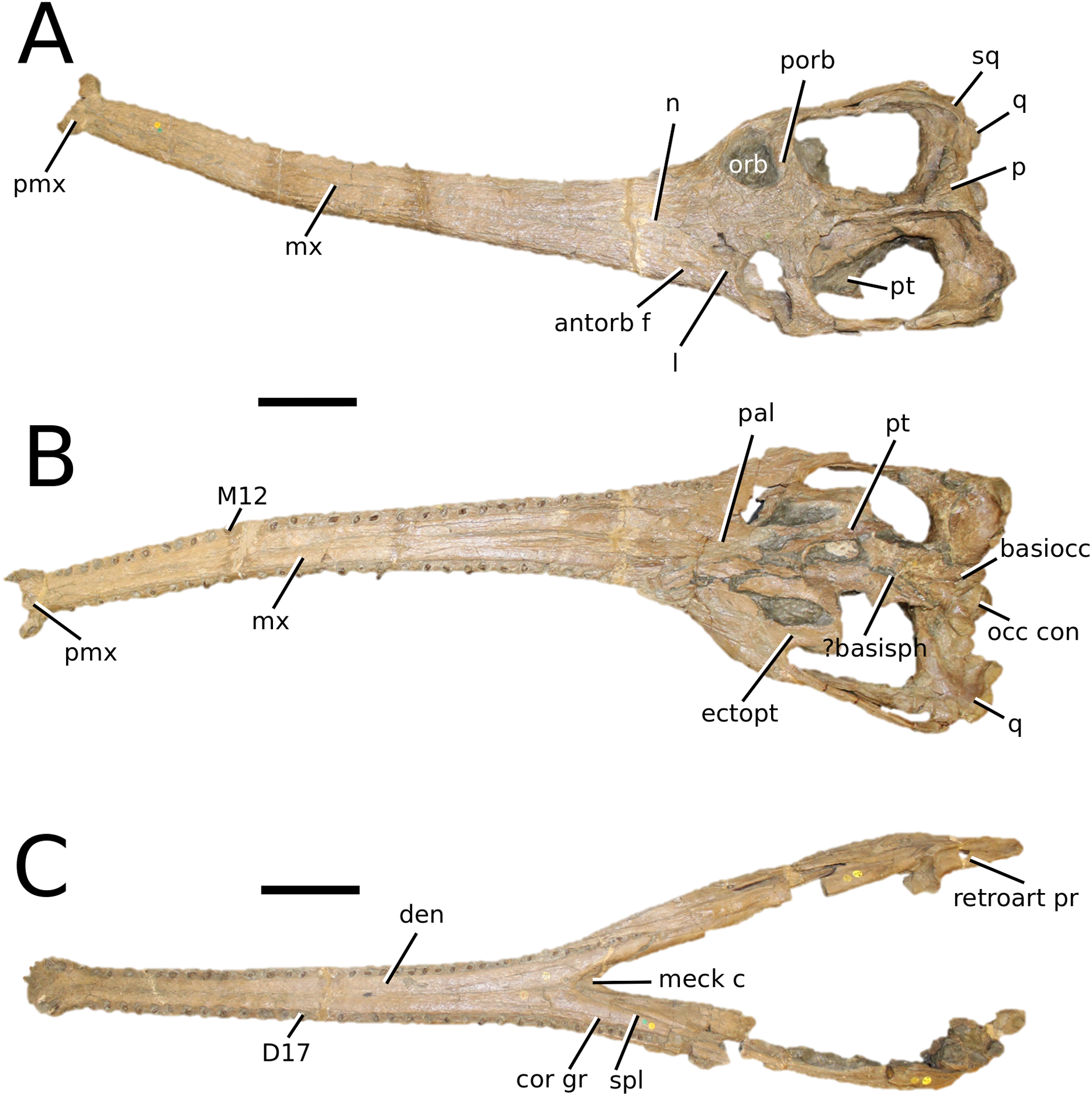
- Holotype skull

Scientific classification
- Kingdom: Animalia
- Phylum: Chordata
- Class: Reptilia
- Clade: Pseudosuchia
- Clade: Crocodylomorpha
- Suborder: †Thalattosuchia
- Family: †Teleosauridae
- Subfamily: †Aeolodontinae
- Genus: †Mycterosuchus; Andrews, 1913

Species
- †M. nasutus Andrews, 1909 (type)

= Mycterosuchus =

Mycterosuchus Temporal range: Callovian, 167–162 Ma

Extinct genus of reptiles

Mycterosuchus is an extinct genus of teleosaurid crocodyliform from the Middle Jurassic (Callovian) of England. Although previously synonymized with Steneosaurus, recent cladistic analysis considers it distantly related to the Steneosaurus type species.

== Taxonomy ==
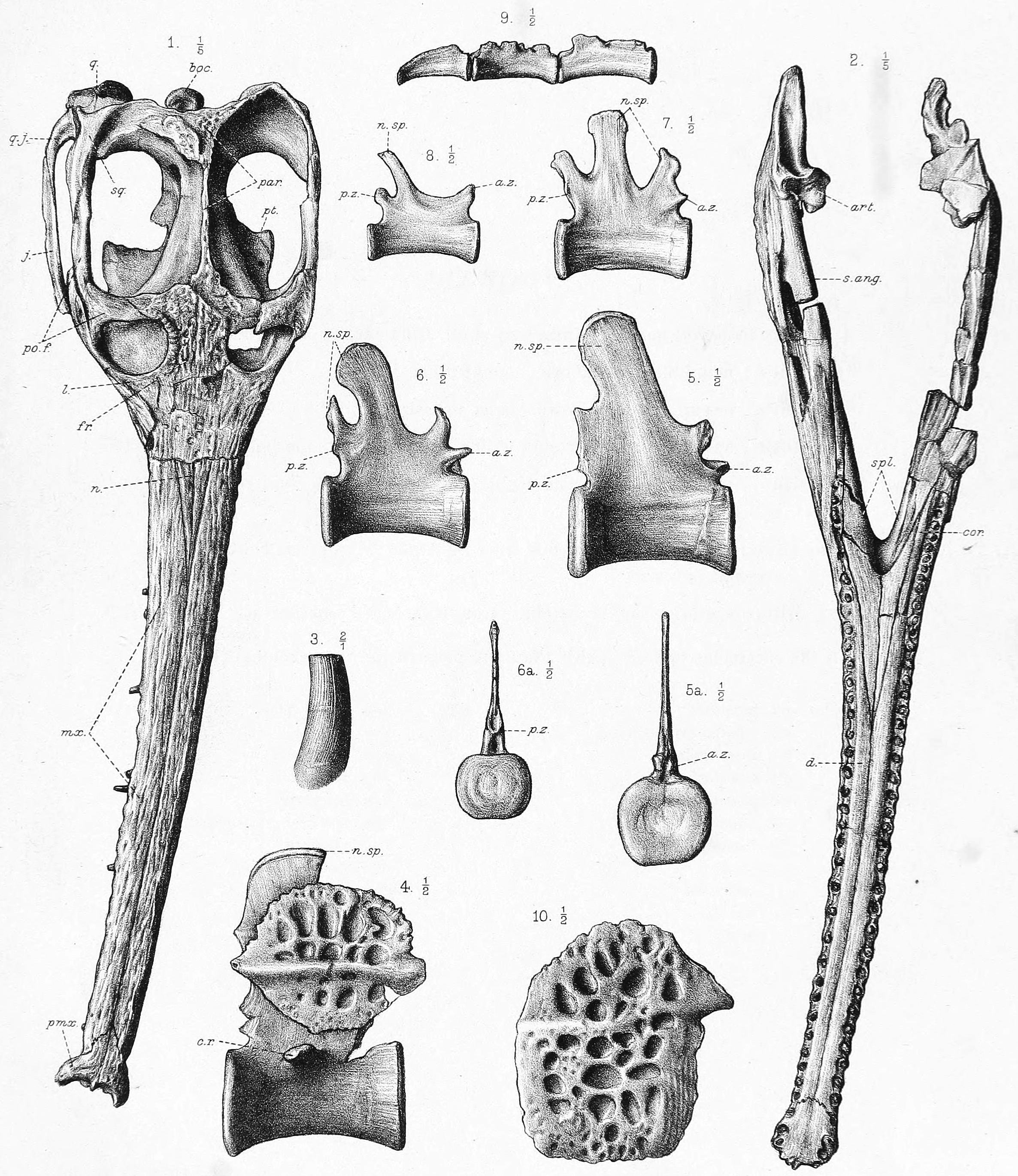
Holotype elements

The name Mycterosuchus was coined for Steneosaurus nasutus by Andrews in 1913 in his catalogue of thalattosuchians from the Oxford Clay of southern England. The genus name is derived from the Latin word for nose (mycto) and the Greek word for crocodile (soukhos), together meaning '(long) nose crocodile'. Mycterosuchus nasutus was synonymized with Steneosaurus leedsi by Adams-Tresmand in 1987, but is recovered as a distinct species in the cladistic analysis of Osi et al. of 2018.

== See also ==
- List of marine reptiles
