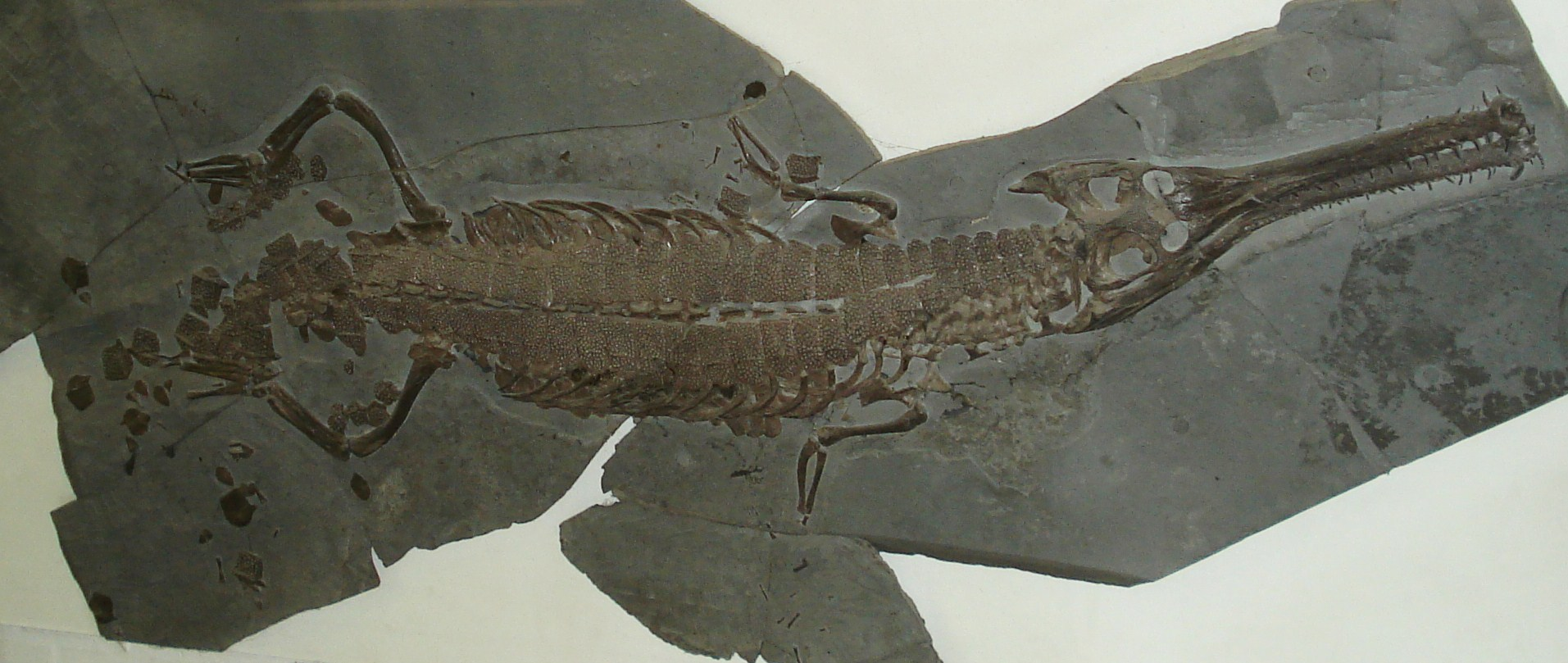
- Platysuchus multiscrobiculatus

Scientific classification
- Kingdom: Animalia
- Phylum: Chordata
- Class: Reptilia
- Clade: Pseudosuchia
- Clade: Crocodylomorpha
- Suborder: †Thalattosuchia
- Family: †Teleosauridae
- Subfamily: †Teleosaurinae
- Genus: †Platysuchus; Westphal, 1961
- Species: †P. multiscrobiculatus

Binomial name
- †Platysuchus multiscrobiculatus (Berckhemer, 1929)

= Platysuchus =

Platysuchus Temporal range: 183–176 Ma Toarcian

Genus of reptiles

Platysuchus ("flat crocodile") is an extinct genus of teleosaurid crocodyliform from the Early Jurassic (Toarcian) of southern Germany and Luxembourg.

== Taxonomy ==
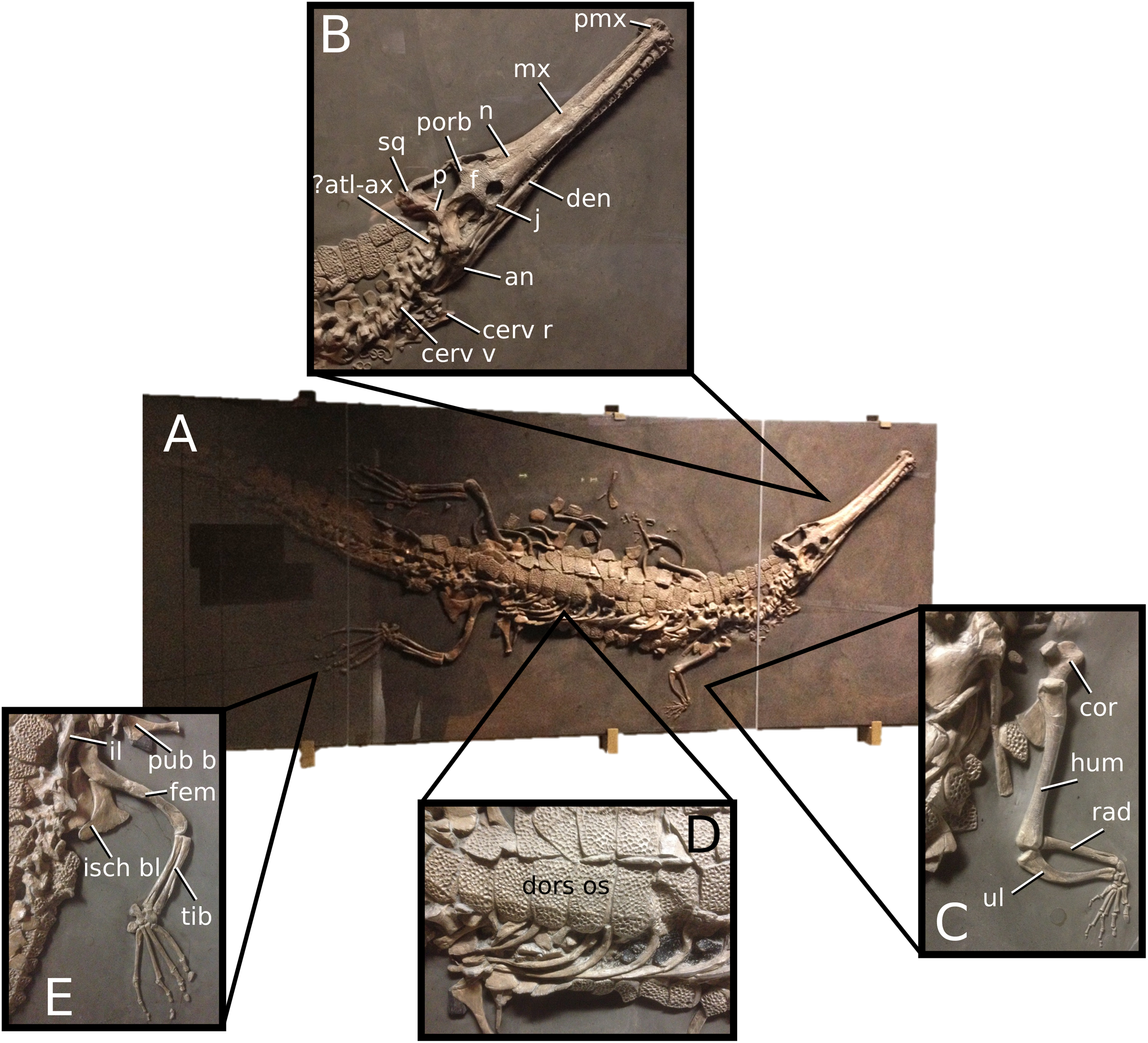
Close ups of various parts of the holotype

Platysuchus was originally described as a member of the genus Mystriosaurus, as M. multiscrobiculatus. However, Westphal (1961) found M. multiscrobiculatus generically distinct from Mystriosaurus and renamed it Platysuchus.

== Distribution ==
Platysuchus has been found in Toarcian age marine deposits in southern Germany and Luxembourg.
