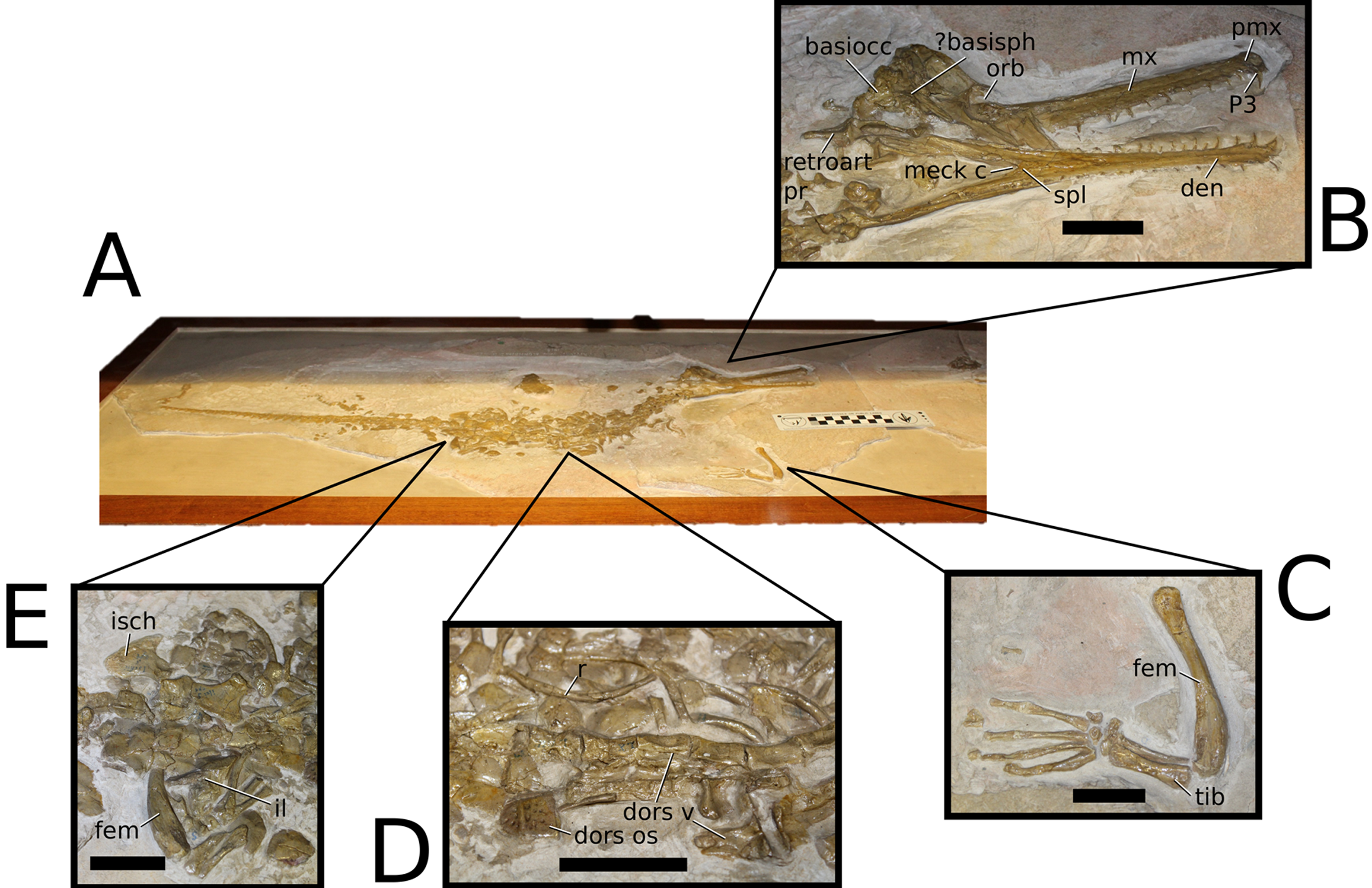
- Holotype specimen (NMHUK PV R 1086)

Scientific classification
- Kingdom: Animalia
- Phylum: Chordata
- Class: Reptilia
- Clade: Archosauria
- Clade: Pseudosuchia
- Clade: Crocodylomorpha
- Suborder: †Thalattosuchia
- Superfamily: †Teleosauroidea
- Family: †Teleosauridae
- Subfamily: †Aeolodontinae
- Genus: †Aeolodon von Meyer, 1830
- Species: †A. priscus

Binomial name
- †Aeolodon priscus (von Söemmerring, 1815)

Synonyms
- Crocodylus priscus von Söemmerring, 1814

= Aeolodon =

Aeolodon Temporal range: Tithonian

Extinct genus of reptiles

Aeolodon is an extinct genus of teleosaurid crocodyliform reptile from the Late Jurassic (Tithonian) of Germany and France that was initially named as a species of Crocodylus in 1814. Although previously synonymized with Steneosaurus, recent cladistic analysis considers it distantly related to the Steneosaurus type species and the type species is A. priscus, named in 1830 and described in 2020.

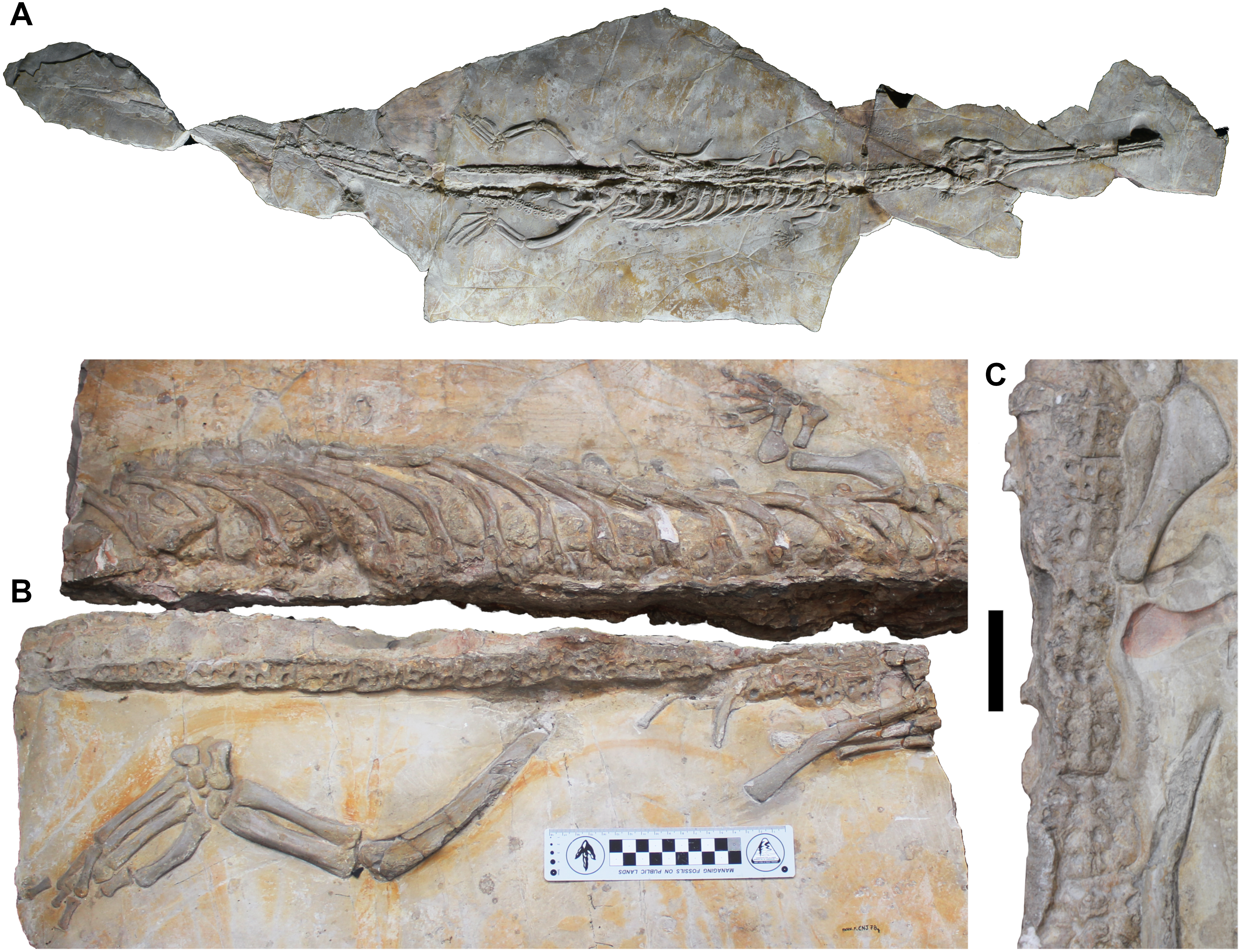
Assigned specimen (MNHN.F.CNJ 78a)

The holotype of Aeolodon priscus was found in the Mörnsheim Formation of Daiting, Bavaria, Germany, in the same quarry that produced the Geosaurus giganteus holotype and the assigned specimen was discovered in the Canjuers conservation Lagerstätte of Var, France.

== See also ==
- List of marine reptiles
