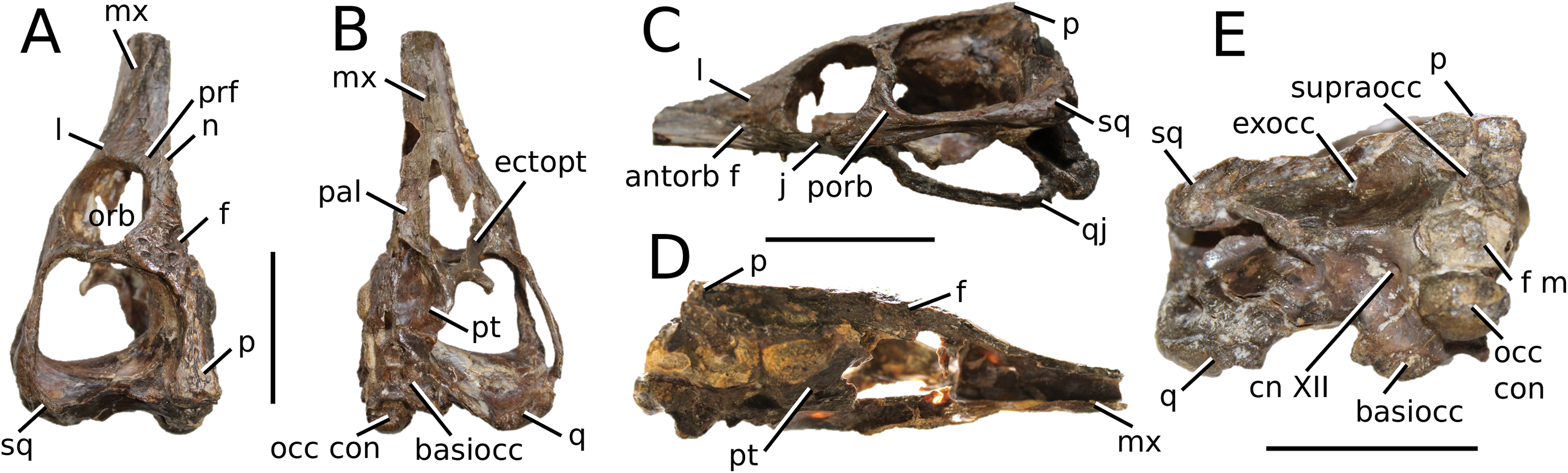
- Holotype skull of T. cadomensis (MNHN AC 8746) seen from multiple angles

Scientific classification
- Kingdom: Animalia
- Phylum: Chordata
- Class: Reptilia
- Clade: Pseudosuchia
- Clade: Crocodylomorpha
- Suborder: †Thalattosuchia
- Family: †Teleosauridae
- Subfamily: †Teleosaurinae
- Genus: †Teleosaurus; Geoffroy, 1825 vide Cuvier, 1824

Type species
- †Teleosaurus cadomensis (Lamouroux, 1820)

Other species
- T. geoffroyi? Eudes-Deslongchamps, 1868c

Synonyms
- Crocodylus cadomensis Lamouroux, 1820; Teleosaurus asthenodirus Owen, 1842; Teleosaurus brevior Owen, 1884; Teleosaurus eucephalus Seeley, 1880; Teleosaurus gladius Eudes-Deslongchamps, 1868c; Teleosaurus lacunosae Quenstedt, 1858; Teleosaurus latifrons Owen, 1884; Teleosaurus minimus Quenstedt, 1852; Teleosaurus ornati Quenstedt, 1852; Teleosaurus soemmeringii Holl, 1829; Teleosaurus subulidens Phillips, 1871

= Teleosaurus =

Teleosaurus Temporal range: Bajocian–Bathonian, 171–164 Ma

Extinct genus of reptiles

Teleosaurus (from Greek: τέλειος téleios, 'perfect' and Greek: σαῦρος saûros, 'lizard') is an extinct genus of teleosaurid crocodyliform found in the Middle Jurassic Calcaire de Caen Formation of France. It was approximately 3 metres (10 ft) in length. The holotype is MNHN AC 8746, a quarter of a skull and other associated postcranial remains, while other fragmentary specimens are known. The type species is T. cadomensis, but a second species, T. geoffroyi may also exist. It was previously considered a wastebasket taxon, with many other remains assigned to the genus.

== History ==
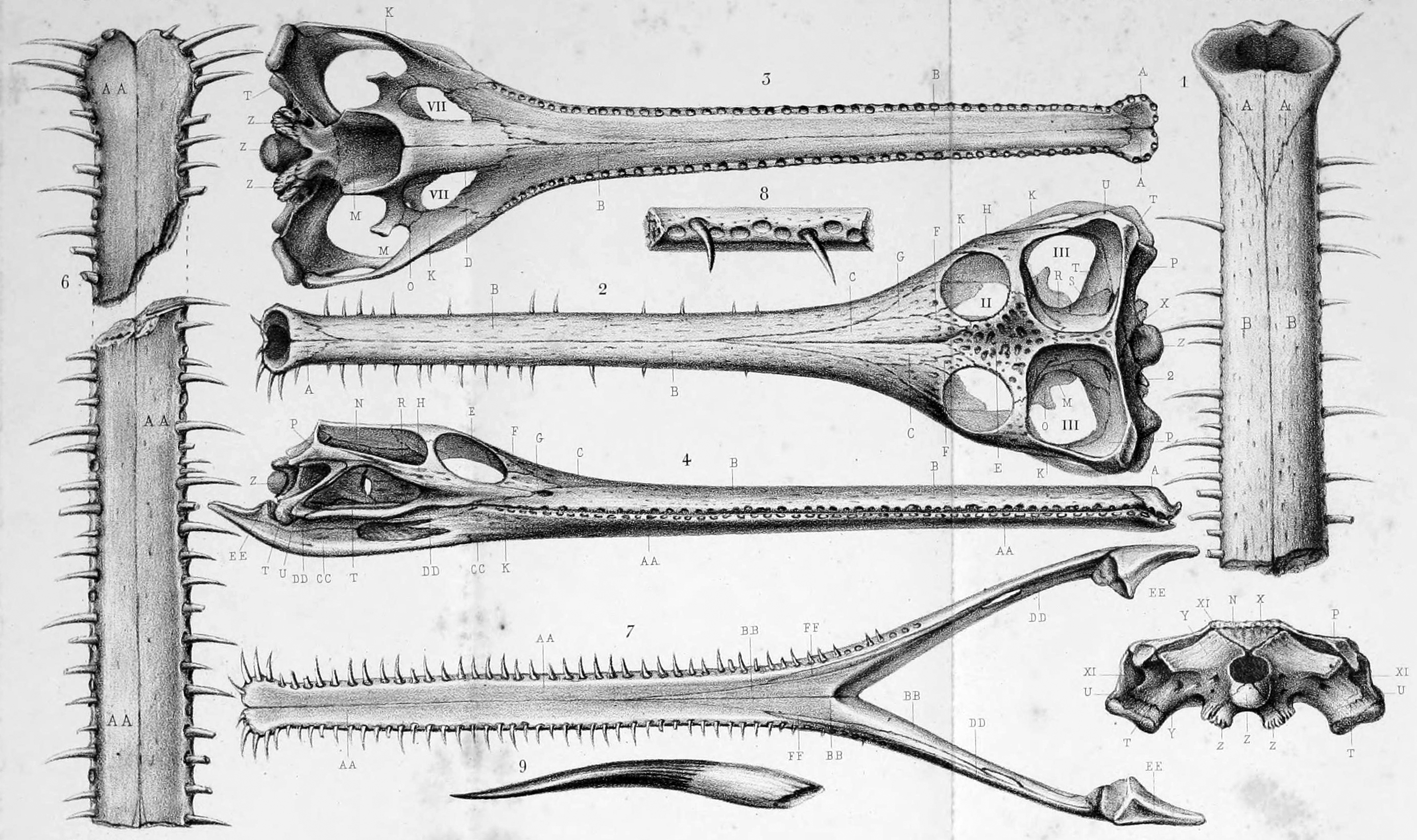
Skull illustration

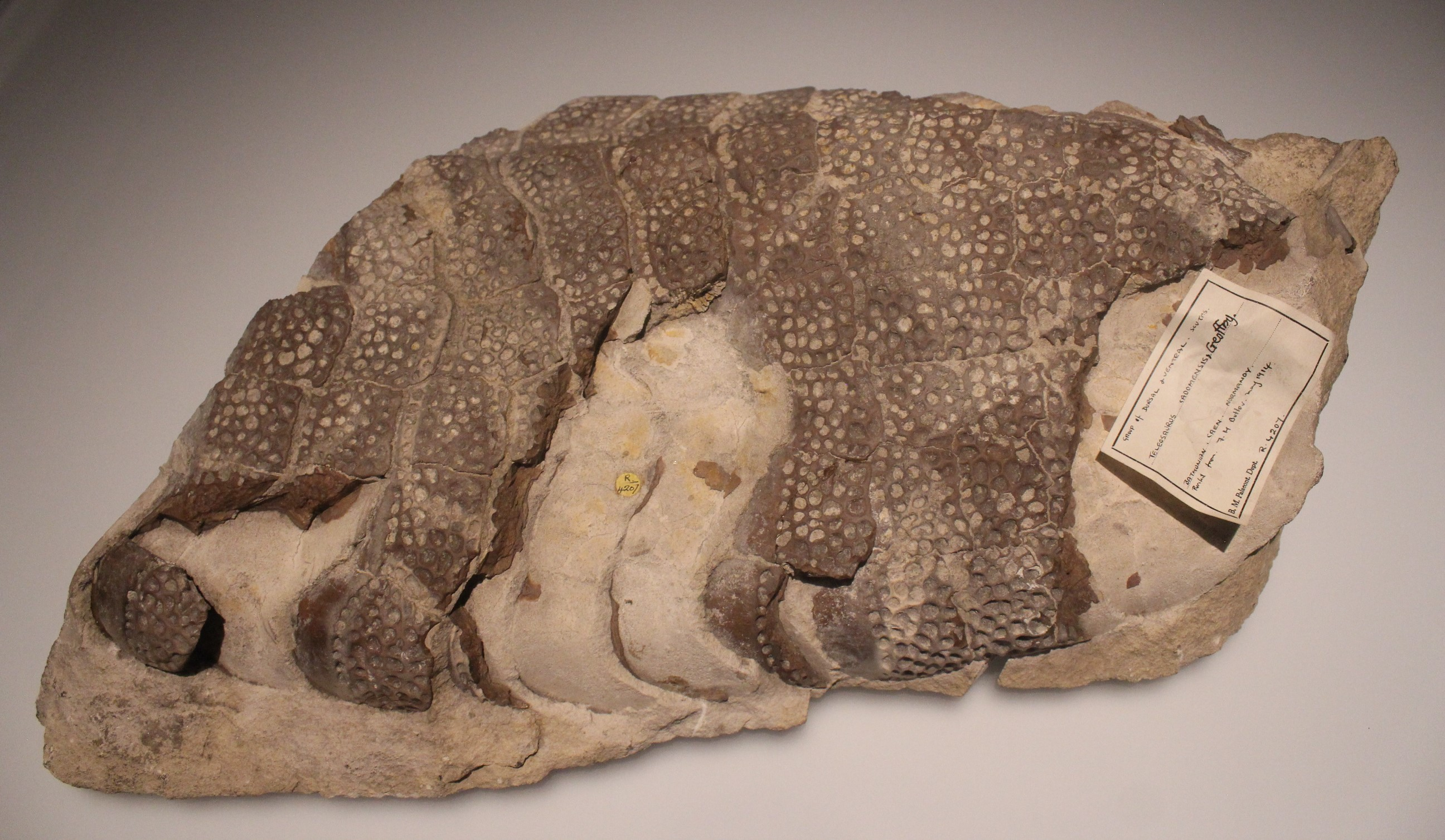
Dorsal osteoderms (NHMUK PV R 4207) of T. cadomensis from Normandy, which have been in the collection of the Field Museum of Natural History since 1914

Teleosaur remains have been known to science since at least 1758, although at first scientists believed the remains belonged to extinct crocodiles and alligators, and remains that have at one point in time been attributed to Teleosaurus (and Steneosaurus) have been known to science since at least 1800. The holotype was discovered during the early 19th century by Pierre Tesson before he traded it with Lamoroux. Teleosaurus was briefly noted on by Jean Vincent Félix Lamouroux in 1820 as Crocodilus cadomensis and then he sent the specimen to Georges Cuvier. It was fully described by Cuvier in 1824, but it was not published until a year later by Étienne Geoffroy Saint-Hilaire.

The second species attributed to Teleosaurus, T. soemmeringii (now a synonym of T. cadomensis), was named in 1829. In 1842, T. asthenodeirus, was named. T. minimus and T ornati were named in 1852 and it is now firmly a synonym of T. cadomensis. Friedrich August von Quenstedt also added T. lacunosae several years later in 1858. Eudes-Deslongchamps followed in 1868, naming the two species T. geoffroyi and T. gladius - both are based on remains destroyed in Caen in 1944. T. geoffroyi, described on the basis of now destroyed mandibular fragments, was considered a valid species by Vignaud (1995), but it was made a probable synonym of T. cadomensis in 2020. Richard Owen added T. brevior and T. latifrons to Teleosaurus in 1884.

In 2019, the taxonomy of Teleosauroidea was reviewed and T. cadomensis was seen as the only valid species. The rest of the known species were absorbed into T. cadomensis or other genera. This study was published in October 2020.

== Description ==
Teleosaurus had highly elongate jaws, similar to those of a modern gharial. It had a long, slender, body, with a sinuous tail that would have helped propel it through the water. Its forelimbs were remarkably short, and would probably have been held close to the body when swimming to improve the animal's streamlining. Unlike modern crocodilians, it lived in the open ocean, and it probably caught fish and squid with its sharp, needle-like teeth.

=== Known remains ===
Teleosaurus cadomensis is known from the following specimens:

- MNHN AC 8746 (holotype): quarter of a skull and other associated postcranial remains
- NHMUK PV OR 119a: dorsal osteoderms
- NHMUK PV R 4207: dorsal osteoderms
- NHMUK PV OR 32588: dorsal, sacral and caudal vertebrae
- NHMUK PV OR 32657: femur
- NHMUK PV OR 32680: ischium
- NHMUK PV OR 33124 mandibular symphysis
- NHMUK PV OR 39788: partial rostrum
- NHMUK PV R 880 and NHMUK PV R 880a: additional casts
