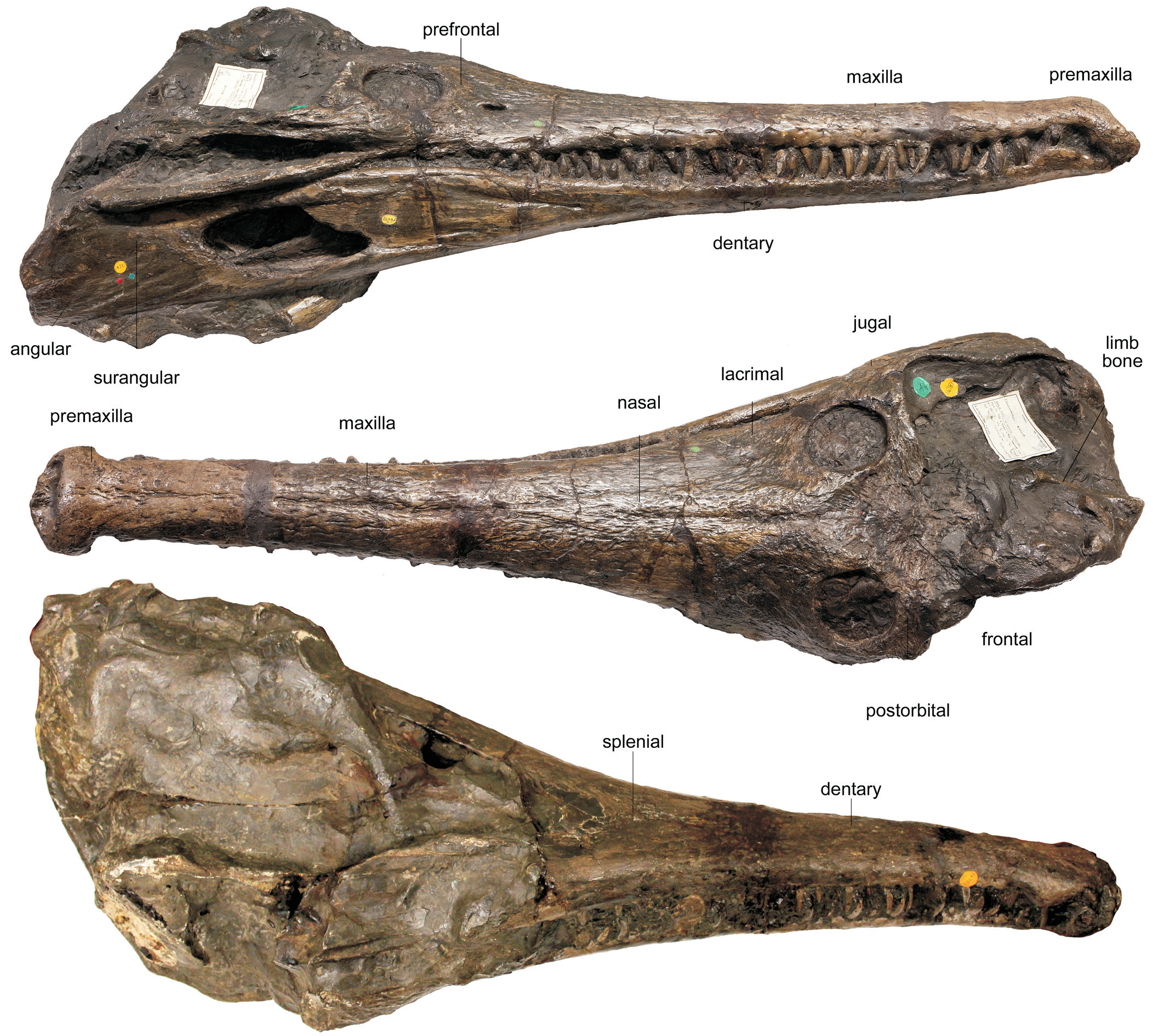
- Assigned specimen (holotype of the junior synonym Steneosaurus brevior)

Scientific classification
- Kingdom: Animalia
- Phylum: Chordata
- Class: Reptilia
- Clade: Archosauria
- Clade: Pseudosuchia
- Clade: Crocodylomorpha
- Suborder: †Thalattosuchia
- Family: †Teleosauridae
- Genus: †Mystriosaurus; Kaup, 1834
- Species: †M. laurillardi

Binomial name
- †Mystriosaurus laurillardi Kaup, 1834

Synonyms
- †"Steneosaurus" brevior Blake, 1876: Engyommasaurus Kaup, 1834

= Mystriosaurus =

Mystriosaurus Temporal range: Early Jurassic Toarcian

Extinct genus of crocodilians

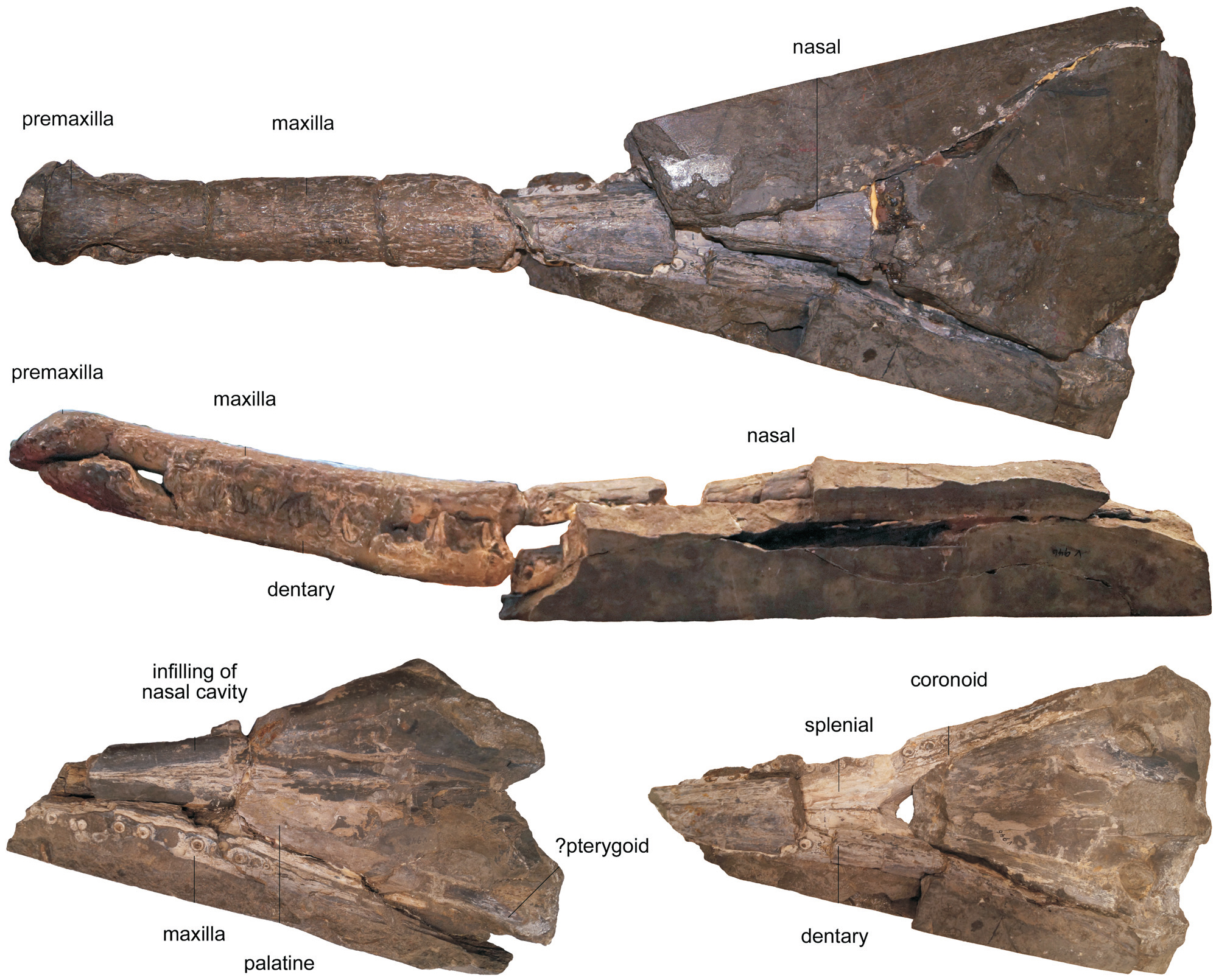
Holotype skull

Mystriosaurus is an extinct genus of teleosaurid crocodyliform from the Early Jurassic (Toarcian). Fossil specimens have been found in the Whitby Mudstone of England and Posidonia Shale of Germany. The only known species, M. laurillardi, exceeded 4 metres (13 ft) in length.

A 2019 phylogenetic analysis found Mystriosaurus to be distinct from Steneosaurus.

== See also ==
- List of marine reptiles
