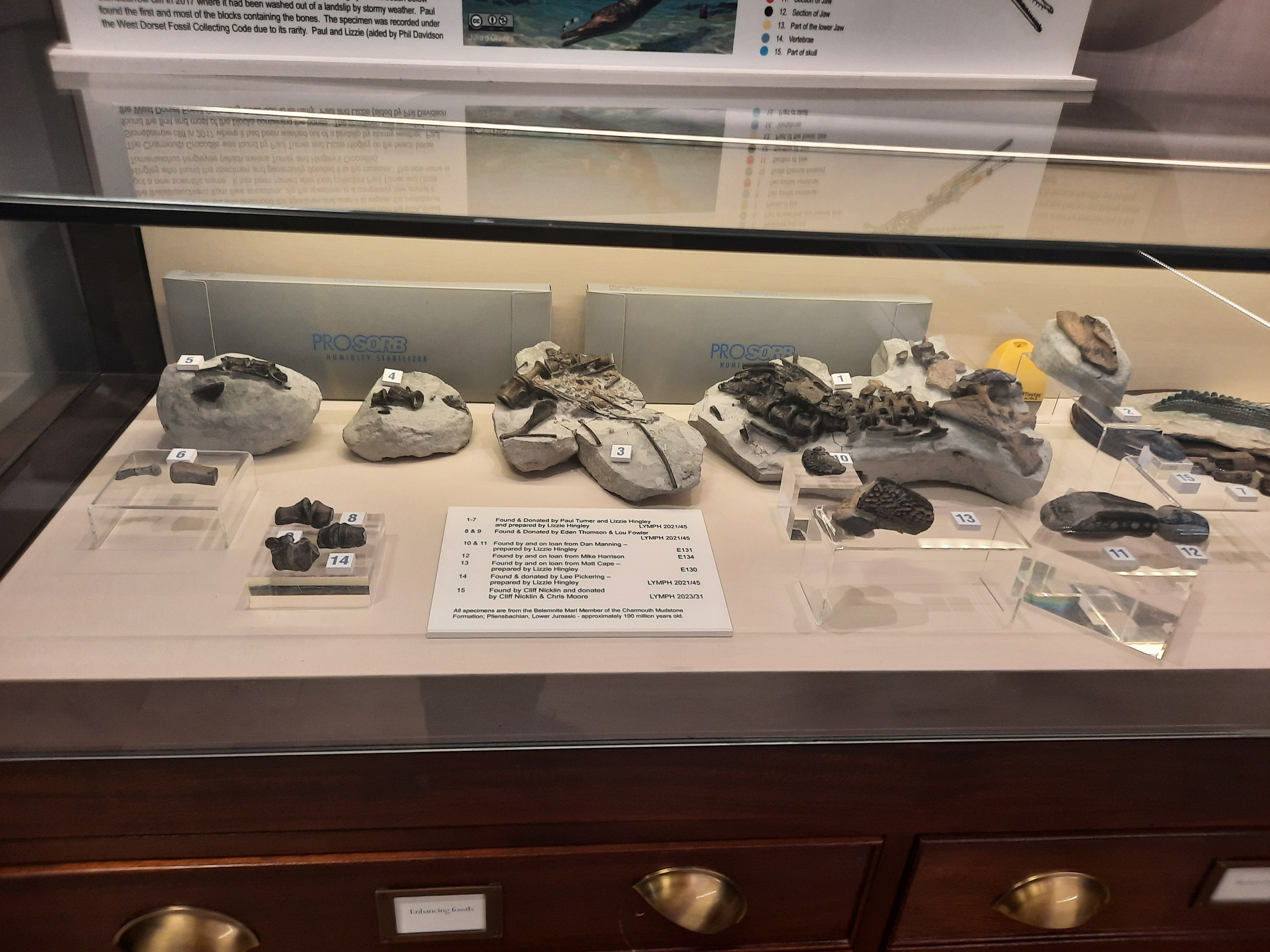
- Holotype of T. hingleyae on display at the Lyme Regis Museum
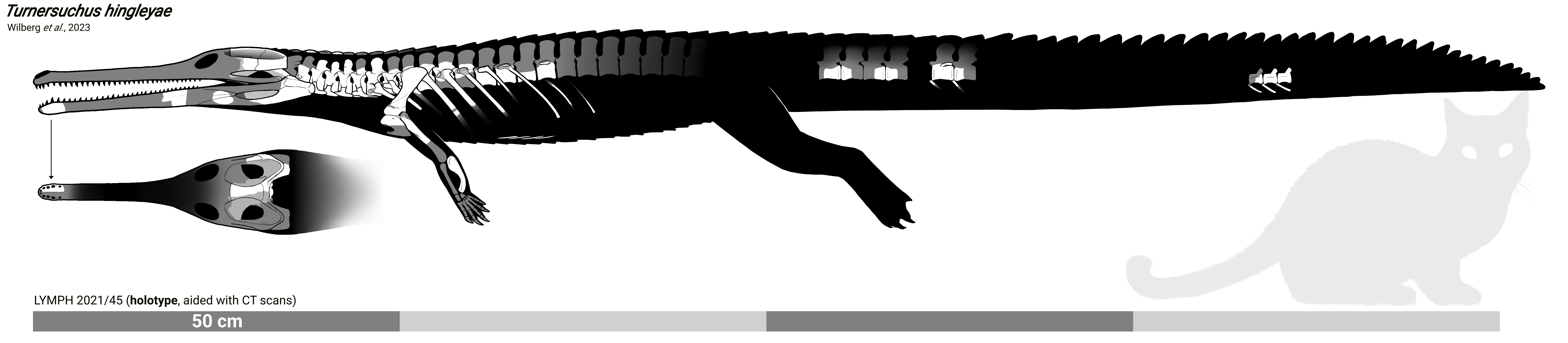
- Skeletal reconstruction of the known remains

Scientific classification
- Kingdom: Animalia
- Phylum: Chordata
- Class: Reptilia
- Clade: Archosauria
- Clade: Pseudosuchia
- Clade: Crocodylomorpha
- Suborder: †Thalattosuchia
- Genus: †Turnersuchus; Wilberg et al., 2023

Type species
- †Turnersuchus hingleyae Wilberg et al., 2023

= Turnersuchus =

Turnersuchus Temporal range: Early Pliensbachian, 190 Ma

Extinct genus of reptiles

Turnersuchus is an extinct genus of thalattosuchian, a group of marine crocodylomorphs, from the Pliensbachian of the United Kingdom. It is the oldest diagnostic member of Thalattosuchia and was also found to be the group's most basal member, being situated outside the two major groups Metriorhynchoidea and Teleosauroidea. Subsequently, this genus is considered to be of great importance to understanding the relationship between thalattosuchians and other crocodylomorphs as well as their rapid diversification during the early Jurassic. Turnersuchus is a monotypic genus, meaning it includes only a single species, Turnersuchus hingleyae.

== History and naming ==
The fossils of Turnersuchus were discovered in 2017 within the Belemnite Marl Member of the British Charmouth Mudstone Formation in Dorset and the specimens were recorded under the West Dorset Fossil Collecting Code due to their rarity. The holotype, LYMPH 2021/45, is preserved in five large blocks with several additional isolated elements and consists of a partial skull and mandible, articulated cervical and dorsal vertebrae alongside various ribs of this region, isolated tail vertebrae, parts of the right shoulder girdle with the humerus and ulna, a tibia and a single osteoderm of the dorsal armor. As of August 2023, the holotype is on display at the Lyme Regis Museum.

The name Turnersuchus hingleyae honors two people involved with the discovery of this taxon. The genus is named after Paul Turner who discovered the initial fossil blocks and subsequently donated them, while the species name is based on Elizabeth "Lizzie" Hingley who prepared the specimen and discovered additional material. The suffix -suchus is derived from the Greek "soukhos" for crocodile.

== Description ==
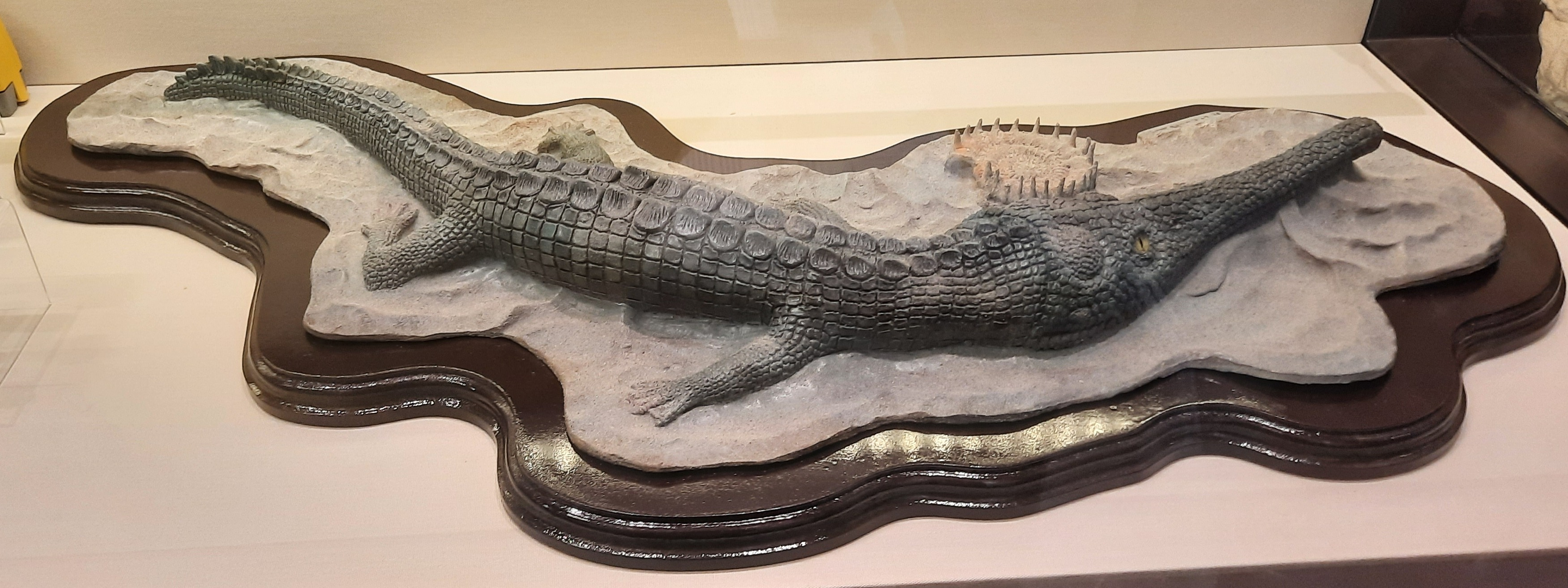
Model of T. hingleyae, and an ammonite, on display at the Lyme Regis Museum

Although the skull is primarily known from elements of the braincase, the fragmentary remains of the mandible show that Turnersuchus had rather narrow jaws. However, the authors note that the basioccipital tubera, which are typically associated with elongation of the jaws and longirostrine skull morphology, are only poorly developed. They subsequently suggest that although narrow, the jaws of Turnersuchus may not have been as long as in some of the more derived thalattosuchians.

The shoulder girdle is only partially preserved. The shoulder blade is the better preserved element, being present in its entirety and only broken, while the coracoid is only known from its proximal end. Generally, these elements are larger in Turnersuchus than in some metriorhynchids such as Cricosaurus, which has reduced forelimbs. The preserved portion of the coracoid is similar to the teleosaur Charitomenosuchus and the metriorhynchid Magyarosuchus, while the flattened scapula bears resemblance to Macrospondylus and Pelagosaurus with the almost equally expanded distal and proximal ends. The humerus is flat and broad with a nearly straight shaft and reduced deltopectoral crest. The ulna is strongly curved and possesses a proximal surface twice as wide as the shaft of the bone. Compared to the humerus, the ulna is highly reduced, only half the length of the former. The reduction of the deltapectoral crest and the length of the ulna are also seen in later metriorhynchids, however to a much greater degree.

The only known osteoderm of Turnersuchus is oval in shape with pitted ornamentation and a slight keel running down the middle. Based on its shape it is believed that it may have been a tail osteoderm closer to the end than the base, which are rarely reported from thalattosuchians.

== Phylogeny ==
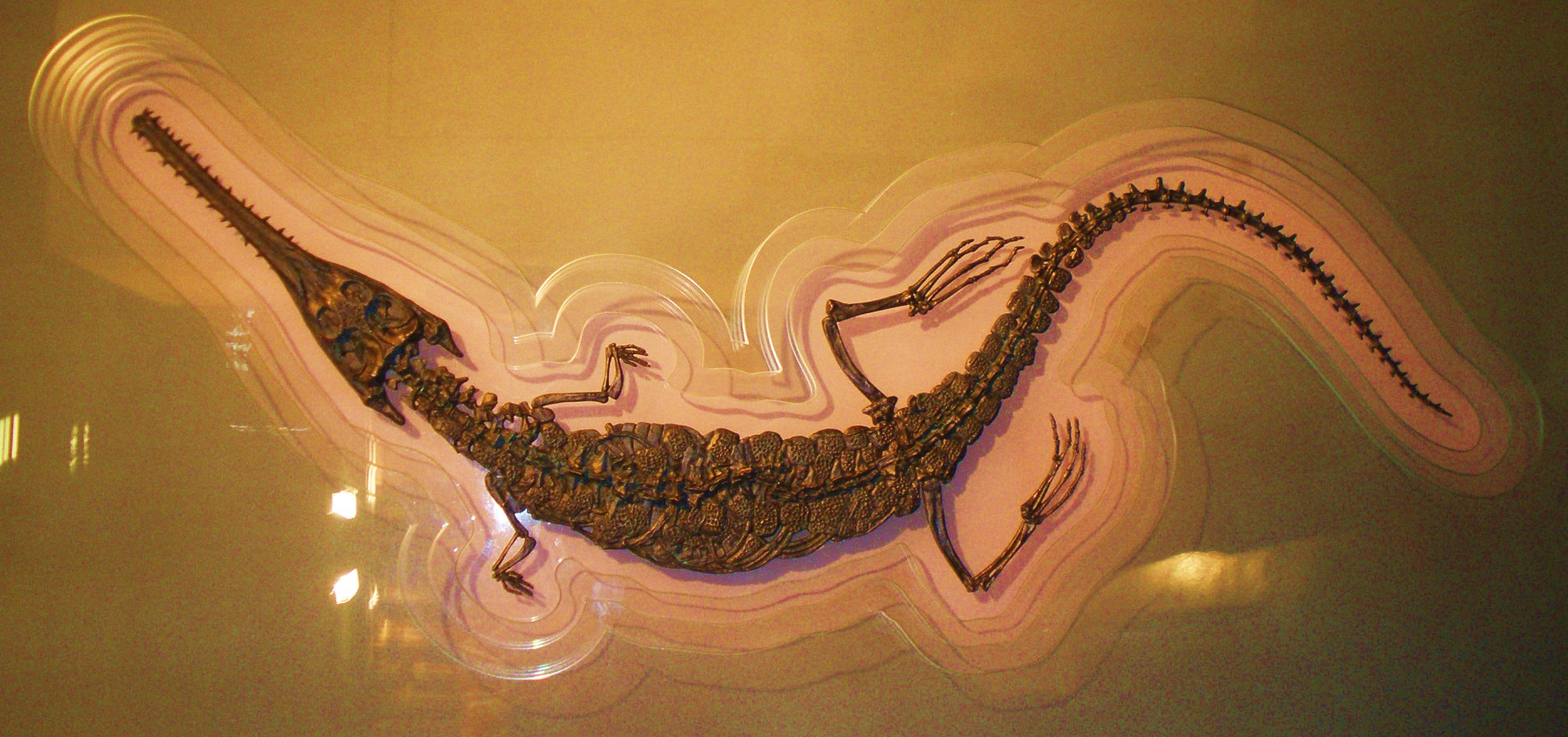
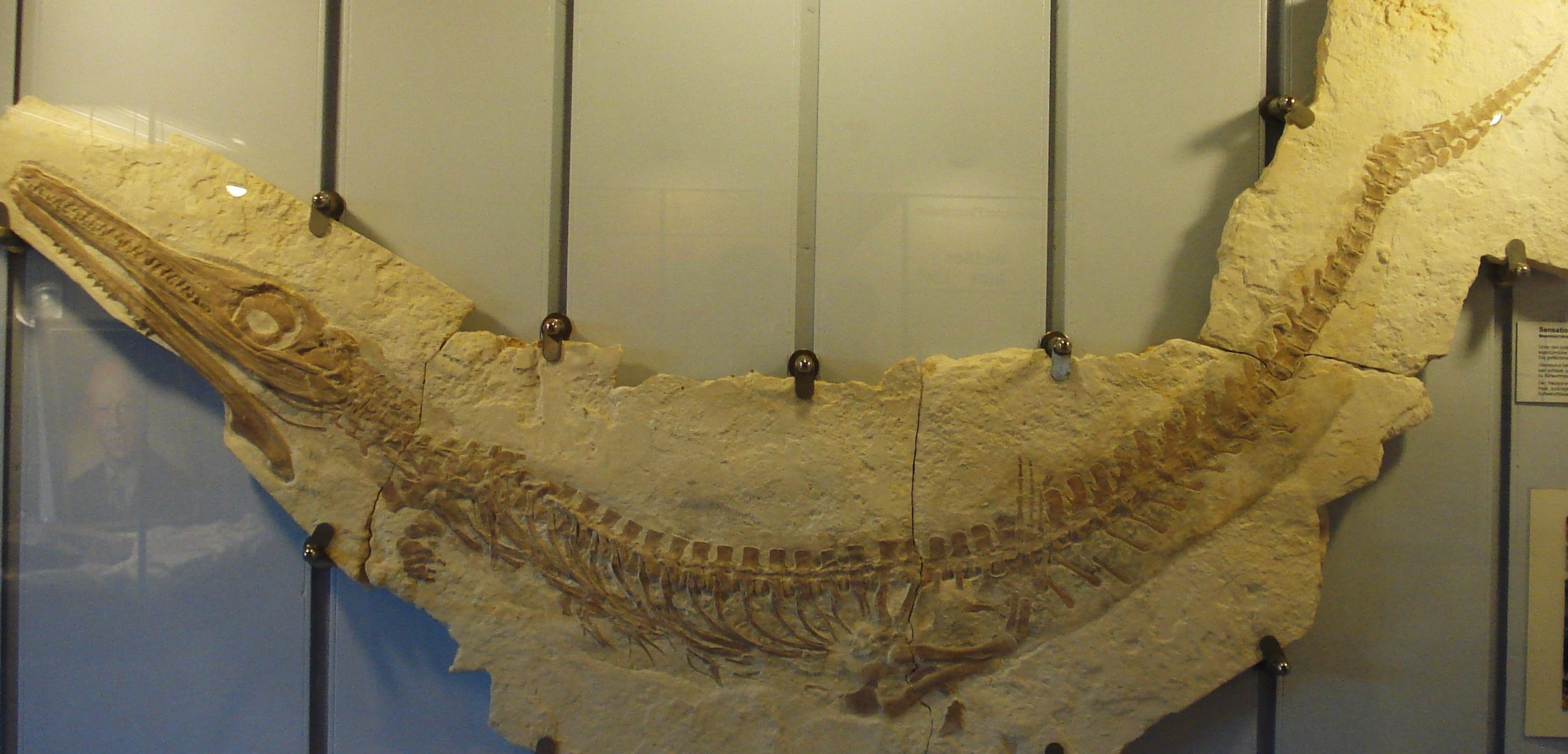
Phylogenetic analysis suggests that Turnersuchus was the basalmost thalattosuchian, diverging before the split between teleosauroids such as Steneosaurus (top) and metriorhynchoids such as Cricosaurus (bottom)

Two phylogenetic analysis were conducted to determine the position of Turnersuchus within Thalattosuchia, one based on the dataset of Wilberg et al. (2019) and another modified from Herrera et al. (2021). Both datasets result in Turnersuchus being recovered as the basalmost member of Thalattosuchia, supported by four and five synapomorphies respectively. While the inclusion of Turnersuchus within Thalattosuchia is thus well supported, the exclusion of it from either teleosauroids or metriorhynchoids is less so. Only a single synapomorphy unambiguously points towards Turnersuchus not being part of these clades in either analysis. These traits additionally differ in both datasets, with Wilberg et al. excluding it based on a character of the basioccipital and Herrera et al. excluding it based on the shape of the scapula. Each analysis thus offers three alternative placements within Thalattosuchia, all of which being only one step longer than the most parsimonious position. These include the possibility that Turnersuchus may be the earliest diverging metriorhynchoid, earliest diverging teleosauroid or most closely allied with Plagiophthalmosuchus. The last placement differs in its details between the analysis. In the Wilberg dataset this alternative would place both taxa at the base of teleosauroids, while the Herrera dataset suggests that in this alternative placement Plagiopthalmosuchus may be an even more basal thalattosuchian than Turnersuchus. Overall, while both analysis agree that the position as basalmost member of Thalattosuchia is the most parsimonious result, this may change as more species are described.

The most parsimonious trees of either analysis are shown below. On the left the strict consensus tree based on the Wilberg et al. dataset and on the right the strict consensus tree of the Herrera et al. dataset.

- - Crocodyliformes
  - - Thalattosuchia
      - Turnersuchus hingleyae
      - - Teleosauroidea
          - Plagiophthalmosuchus gracilirostris
          - - Teleosaurus cadomensis
            - - - - - Indosinosuchus potamosiamensis
                    - IVPP RV 10098
                  - - Platysuchus multiscrobiculatus
                    - Macrospondylus bollensis
                - - "Steneosaurus" brevidens
                  - Mystriosaurus laurillardi
              - - Charitomenosuchus leedsi
                - - Neosteneosaurus edwardsi
                  - - Machimosaurus hugii
                    - Machimosaurus buffetauti
        - Metriorhynchoidea
          - - Magyarosuchus fitosi
            - Pelagosaurus typus
          - - Opisuchus meieri
            - - Teleidosaurus calvadosii
              - - - Eoneustes gaudryi
                  - Eoneustes bathonicus
                - - Zoneait nargorum
                  - Metriorhynchidae

- Crocodyliformes
  - Protosuchia
  - - - Notosuchia
      - Neosuchia
    - - Eopneumatosuchus colbert
      - - Thalattosuchia
          - Turnersuchus hingleyae
          - - Teleosauroidea
              - - Plagiophthalmosuchus gracilirostris
                - - - Peipehsuchus teleorhinus (holotype)
                    - IVPP RV 10098
                    - Mystriosaurus laurillardi
                    - - Teleosaurus cadomensis
                      - Platysuchus multiscrobiculatus
                    - - Mycterosuchus nasutus
                      - - Aeolodon priscus
                        - Bathysuchus megarhinus
                  - - Macrospondylus bollensis
                    - - Charitomenosuchus leedsi
                      - - Proexochokefalos heberti
                        - Deslongchampsina larteti
                        - - Neosteneosaurus edwardsi
                          - - Lemmysuchus obtusidens
                            - Yvridiosuchus boutilieri
                            - Machimosaurus spp.
            - Metriorhynchoidea
              - Pelagosaurus typus
              - - Teleidosaurus calvadosii
                - - - Magyarosuchus fitosi
                    - Metriorhynchoid indet.
                  - - - Opisuchus meieri
                      - Pelagosaurus typus
                    - - - Eoneustes gaudryi
                        - Eoneustes bathonicus
                      - - Zoneait nargorum
                        - Chile metriorhynchoid
                        - Metriorhynchidae

== Implications for thalattosuchian evolution ==
The discovery of Turnersuchus helps fill two major gaps in the understanding of Thalattosuchia. Previously, little was known on their origin, diversification and their relationship to other groups due to the lack of basal members or other transitional forms linking them to Crocodylomorpha as a whole. Phylogenetic analysis often yield contradictory results primarily nesting them in three different positions. As a sister to Crocodyliformes (as also recovered for Turnersuchus using the Wilberg dataset), as more derived mesoeucrocodylians (similar to their position in the Herrera dataset) or as derived neosuchians allied with pholidosaurids and dyrosaurids. The understanding of their dispersal is also heavily affected by the lacking fossil record of early thalattosuchians. Prior to Turnersuchus, the oldest known thalattosuchians were Toarcian in age, at which point the group was already split into its two main branches, rich in species and found across several continents.

With Turnersuchus being recovered as the basalmost thalattosuchian, several similarities were recognized between it and basal members of both Teleosauroidea and Metriorhynchoidea, namely Plagiophthalmosuchus and Pelagosaurus. This helps solidify these traits as ancestral (plesiomorphic) traits of the group as a whole. These ancestral traits include the presence of large supratemporal fenestrae, unflattened skull table, temporal bars with ornamented surface, a squamosal facet, fused pterygoids and the prootic being broadly exposed along the side of the braincase. The quadrate in particular shows several ancestral traits between the three taxa. It makes up the front, top and lower margin of the external otic aperture, excluding the squamosal bone from contributing to its margins and it is furthermore overlapped by a broad process of the otoccipital bone. The quadrate however also serves to differentiate Turnersuchus from more derived thalattosuchians, as it is less integrated into the braincase. This is of significance due to the general evolutionary trend of crocodylomorphs progressively developing quadrates that articulate more and more with the bones of the braincase. This trend can be observed throughout the paraphyletic sphenosuchians and is later continued by crocodyliforms. Thalattosuchians show an intermediate condition between the two, with Turnersuchus displaying a quadrate that is clearly less well integrated than in crocodyliforms or even more derived thalattosuchians. The development of the basioccipital tubera may be ancestral trait that Turnersuchus displays. These tubera are generally thought to be associated with the development of elongated jaws, the longirostrine condition, and are not unique to thalattosuchians. They are however consistently found in members of the clade due to their longirostrine skulls, the only exceptions being the short-skulled Dakosaurus andiniensis and Turnersuchus. Although Turnersuchus had slender jaws, the poorly developed tubera indicate that they were not as elongated as in later forms and that thalattosuchians were ancestrally short-snouted.

In addition to helping uncover the ancestral morphology of Thalattosuchia, Turnersuchus further aids in filling the ghost lineage leading up to the groups explosive radiation during the late Early Jurassic. It pushes the known record of thalattosuchians from the Toarcian back into the Pliensbachian, shortening the period of time between the group's first estimated appearance and the first confirmed fossils. However, the precise divergence remains uncertain. Bayesian analysis based on the two phylogenetic analysis yield vastly different results. Following the interpretation that thalattosuchians are early diverging mesoeucrocodylians, as in the Herrera dataset, the remaining ghost lineage would be relatively short, extending only into the Sinemurian stage of the early Jurassic. However, if they are indeed a sister group to crocodyliforms, as indicated by the Wilberg dataset, then the origin of Thalattosuchia would be pushed back into the Norian, over 13 million years earlier than indicated by the other analysis. The maximum ranges (95% highest posterior density) for both analysis would suggest that the group could have originated in the Late Triassic, either during the Norian or the Rhaetian. This is broadly confirmed by an in-press paper describing an indeterminate teleosauroid from the earliest Jurassic (Hettangian to Sinemurian) of Morocco, which would support the presence of thalattosuchians prior to the Pliensbachian with a possible origin prior to the beginning of the Jurassic.
