= Deslongchamps =

Deslongchamps is a surname of French origin. Notable persons with the surname include:

- Auguste-Louis-Armand Loiseleur-Deslongchamps (1805–1840), French indologist
- Jacques Amand Eudes-Deslongchamps (1794–1867), French naturalist and paleontologist
  - His son Eugène Eudes-Deslongchamps (1830–1889), French naturalist and paleontologist
- Jean-Louis-Auguste Loiseleur-Deslongchamps (1774–1849), French physician and botanist
- Pierre Deslongchamps (born 1938), Canadian chemist
