= Teleidosaurus =

Teleidosaurus Temporal range: Bajocian - Bathonian, 168–167 Ma
- Skull diagram.
- Size comparison, known remains of the taxon in white.

Scientific classification
- Kingdom: Animalia
- Phylum: Chordata
- Class: Reptilia
- Clade: Pseudosuchia
- Clade: Crocodylomorpha
- Suborder: †Thalattosuchia
- Genus: †Teleidosaurus; Eudes-Deslongchamps, 1869
- Species: †T. calvadosii

Binomial name
- †Teleidosaurus calvadosii (Eudes-Deslongchamps, 1866 [originally Teleosaurus])

Genus of large reptiles

Teleidosaurus is an extinct genus of carnivorous metriorhynchoid crocodyliform from Middle Jurassic (late Bajocian to early Bathonian stage) deposits of Normandy, France. The name Teleidosaurus means "Complete lizard", and is derived from the Greek Teleidos- ("complete") and σαῦρος -sauros ("lizard").

== Discovery ==
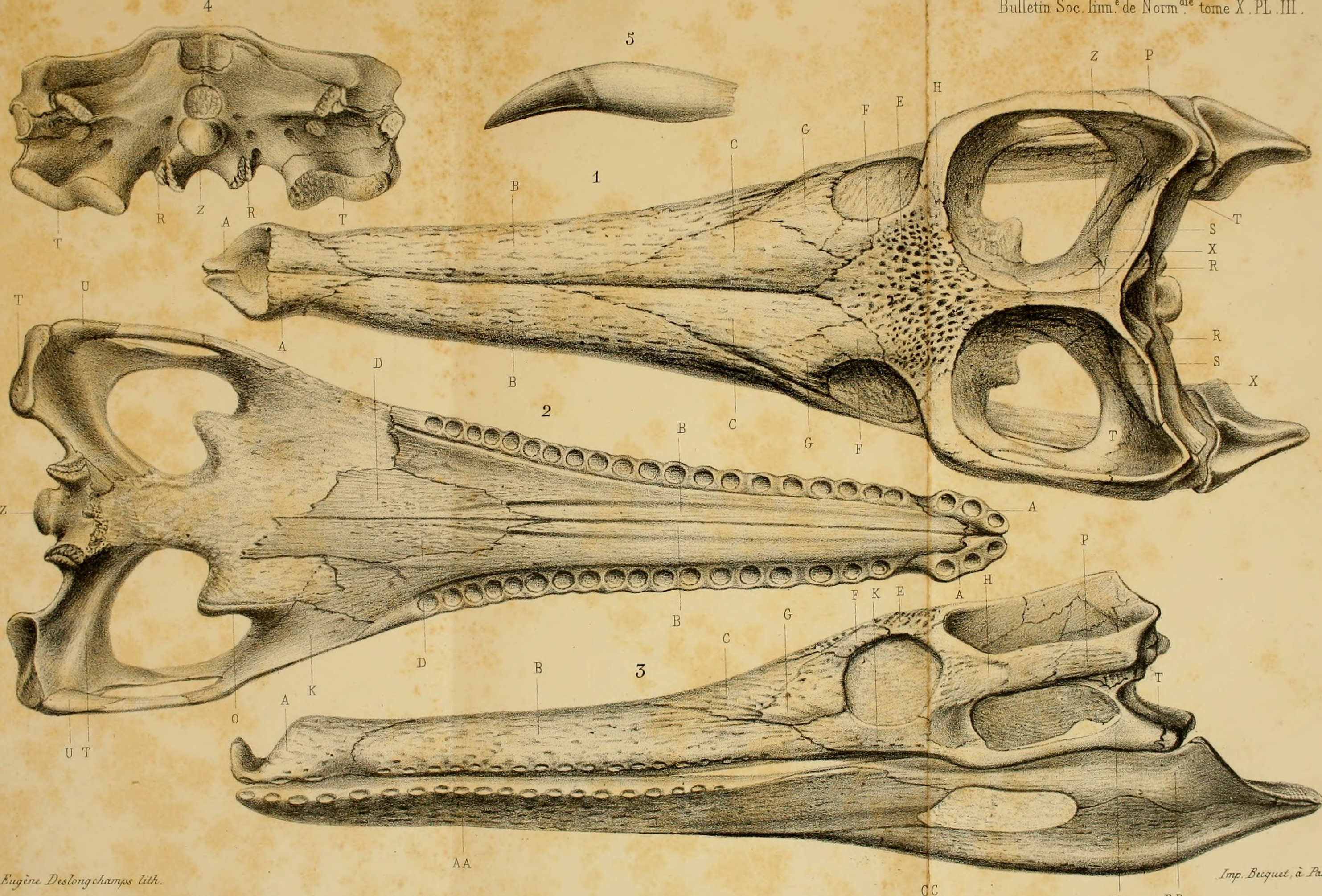
Original illustration of the now-lost holotype (From 1866). Some anatomical aspects like the arrangement of teeth and absence of an antorbital fossa are outdated.

The type species was named Teleosaurus Calvadosii [Sic] by Jacques Amand Eudes-Deslongchamps in 1866; however, it was his son, Eugène Eudes-Deslongchamps who erected the generic name Teleidosaurus later in 1869 for Teleosaurus calvadosii. Teleidosaurus joberti from the Great Oolite Formation is a junior synonym of T. calvadosii. T. calvadosii is known from the plastotype NHM R.2681, a complete skull and mandible and from NHM 32612, the plastotype of T. joberti, fragmentary right mandible. The holotype lost during the Second World War. However, some plastoholotypes of T. calvadosii were saved in the Natural History Museum, London, (NHMUK PV R 2681), the National Museum of Natural History, France, and the Museum of Nancy. A new specimen discovered in the 1980s, comprising a lower jaw, a partial skull and a cervical vertebra, was made the neotype of the species, and has helped clear up some anatomical aspects previously obscured by the cast of the original holotype.

== Classification ==
The only species within Teleidosaurus is the type species T. calvadosii. Both T. bathonicus and T. gaudryi where referred to Eoneustes. All species are from Calvados, Normandy of France. Phylogenetic analyses do not support the monophyly of Teleidosaurus. Once considered a metriorhynchid, Teleidosaurus was later recovered as non-metriorhynchid metriorhynchoid, as its skull possesses some anatomical aspects of metriorhynchids, but also retains some ancestral thalattosuchian characteristics, specially on the lower jaw.

The cladogram below is from a 2024 study on the relationships of thalattosuchians.

- Metriorhynchoidea
  - Pelagosaurus typus
  - - Teleidosaurus calvadosii
    - - - Metriorhynchoidea indet.
        - Magyarosuchus fitosi
      - - - "Pelagosaurus" tomarensis
          - Opisuchus meieri
        - - - Eoneustes bathonicus
            - Eoneustes gaudryi
          - Euthalattosuchia
            - Chile metriorhynchoid
            - Zoneait nargorum
            - - Metriorhynchidae
                - Geosaurinae
                - Metriorhynchinae
