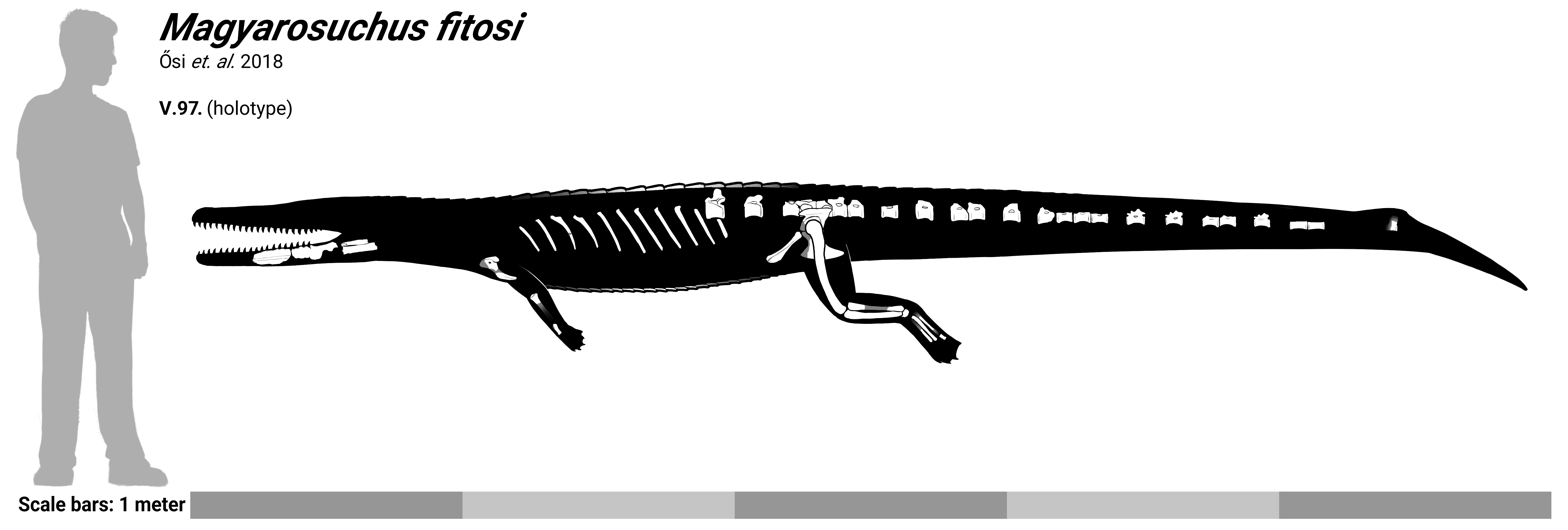
- Skeletal reconstruction and size comparison, known remains in white.

Scientific classification
- Kingdom: Animalia
- Phylum: Chordata
- Class: Reptilia
- Clade: Pseudosuchia
- Clade: Crocodylomorpha
- Suborder: †Thalattosuchia
- Superfamily: †Metriorhynchoidea
- Genus: †Magyarosuchus; Ősi et al., 2018
- Species: †M. fitosi

Binomial name
- †Magyarosuchus fitosi Ősi et al., 2018

= Magyarosuchus =

Magyarosuchus Temporal range: Early Jurassic, Toarcian

Extinct genus of reptiles

Magyarosuchus is an extinct monotypic genus of metriorhynchoid thalattosuchian described for the first time from fossils discovered in the Kisgerecse Marl Formation in Hungary. The type species Magyarosuchus fitosi lived during the Toarcian, about 180 million years ago. It is known from a fragmentary skeleton discovered in 1996.

== Description ==
Magyarosuchus was a large thalattosuchian, the known partial jaw is deeper (taller) than other close relatives like Pelagosaurus, teeth on the lower jaw would've been oriented upwards and slightly out to the sides. Many isolated teeth are preserved in the holotype, these were large and recurved, possessing a circular cross-section and non-serrated edges, along vertically aligned grooves (fluting).

Some limb bones are known, these are similar to those known from other thalattosuchian relatives, its femur and tibia are 36 cm (14 in) and 21 cm (8.3 in) long respectively.

Many caudal vertebrae are preserved, the posterior-most one in the holotype; albeit incomplete, shows a noticeably larger neural spine than the ones before it. This might suggest the presence of a rudimentary vertical expansion (tail fluke) as is known in more derived metriorhynchid relatives.

Many partial osteoderms and some complete ones are known, these would've been arranged in two dorsal, and at least two ventral rows along the body. Each dorsal osteoderm overlapped the one behind it, they were mostly square, and possessed a small lateral ridge. The ventral osteoderms also overlapped front-to-back, and were tightly sutured to the ones beside them, these were much wider than long.

== Evolution & Classification ==
Magyarosuchus is an early member of the clade Metriorhynchoidea. These were the most marine-adapted group of thalattosuchians, with the later and more derived family Metriorhynchidae being fully marine, dolphin-like predators. Magyarosuchus exhibited a mosaic of adaptations for offshore life alongside ancestral, non-marine traits. For instance, it retained body armor similar to that of earlier thalattosuchians and terrestrial crocodylomorphs. However unlike those animals, Magyarosuchus had a tail vertebra that may show the beginnings of a tail fluke. Along its size (larger than any other non-metriorhynchid metriorhynchoid) this combination of traits show that Magyarosuchus represents a transitional form between the fully ocean going metriorhynchids and their earlier non-marine ancestors.

The cladogram below is from a 2024 study on the phylogenetic relationships of thalattosuchians.

- Metriorhynchoidea
  - Pelagosaurus typus
  - - Teleidosaurus calvadosii
    - - - Metriorhynchoidea indet.
        - Magyarosuchus fitosi
      - - - "Pelagosaurus" tomarensis
          - Opisuchus meieri
        - - - Eoneustes bathonicus
            - Eoneustes gaudryi
          - Euthalattosuchia
            - Chile metriorhynchoid
            - Zoneait nargorum
            - - Metriorhynchidae
                - Geosaurinae
                - Metriorhynchinae

== Ecology ==
Magyarosuchus was discovered in the Kisgerecse Marl Formation, whose deposits indicate a more open-ocean environment. It represents the oldest known thalattosuchian adapted to such conditions, rather than to coastal or lagoonal habitats. The frequent occurrence of ammonite fossils in these rocks further supports that this ecosystem was an open ocean.

The adaptations of Magyarosuchus for life in the open ocean, combined with the abundance of ammonite fossils in its environment, may suggest that it may have been a pursuit predator specializing in ammonites.
