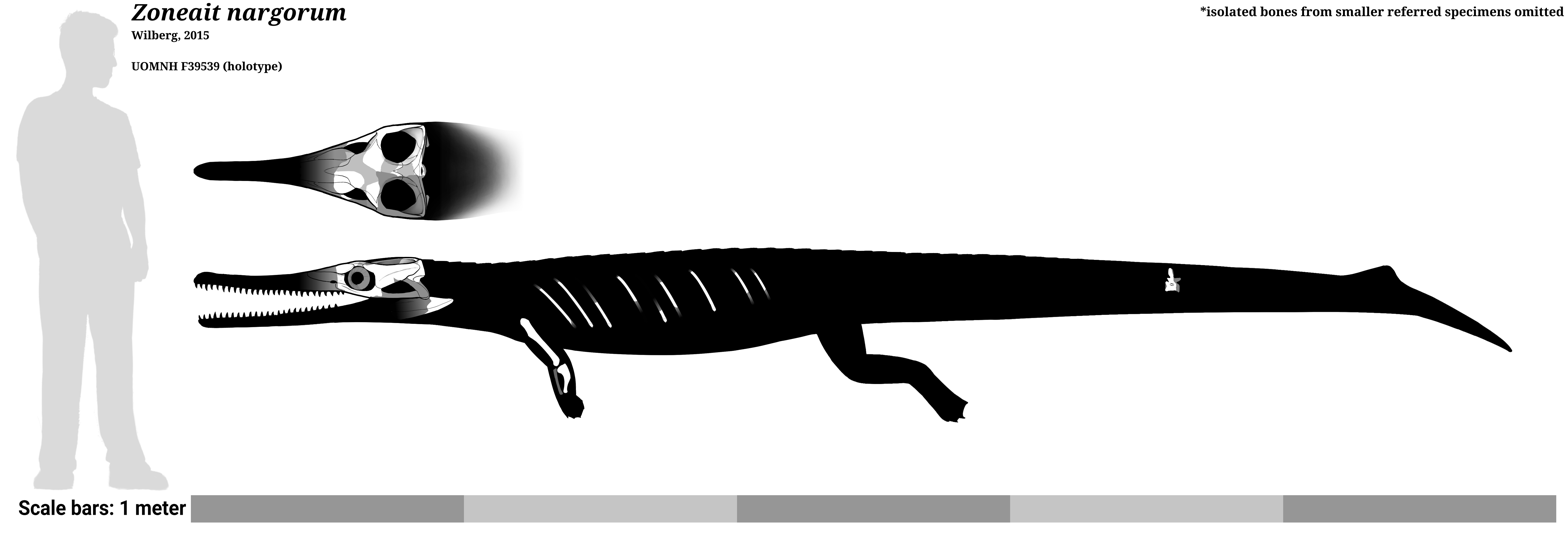
- Skeletal reconstruction of the holotype specimen

Scientific classification
- Kingdom: Animalia
- Phylum: Chordata
- Class: Reptilia
- Clade: Pseudosuchia
- Clade: Crocodylomorpha
- Suborder: †Thalattosuchia
- Superfamily: †Metriorhynchoidea
- Clade: †Euthalattosuchia
- Genus: †Zoneait; Wilberg, 2015
- Species: †Z. nargorum

Binomial name
- †Zoneait nargorum Wilberg, 2015

= Zoneait =

Zoneait Temporal range: Middle Jurassic, Toarcian

Extinct genus of reptiles

Zoneait (pronounced "zone-eight" and meaning "large tooth" in the Kiowa language) is an extinct genus of thalattosuchian crocodylomorph known from a single species, Zoneait nargorum, from the Middle Jurassic Snowshoe Formation of Oregon.

== Discovery and naming ==
The holotype was collected by Lupher and Packard. Z. nargorum was named in 2015 by paleontologist Eric Wilberg on the basis of some partial skulls, vertebrae, and forelimb bones that were found in an outcrop of the Weberg Member of the Snowshoe Formation near the town of Izee. It is a member of Metriorhynchoidea, a clade of marine-adapted thalattosuchians that existed until the Early Cretaceous.

== Description and classification ==
The skeleton of Zoneait possesses several adaptations for offshore marine life but retains features characteristic of its land-living ancestors, indicating that it is a transitional form between the fully marine metriorhynchids of the late Middle Jurassic to Early Cretaceous, and earlier non-marine crocodylomorphs. The Snowshoe Formation was deposited in a shallow marine environment within a tropical forearc basin, suggesting that Zoneait was a marine predator.

Wilberg found that Zoneait is the sister taxon of Metriorhynchidae, which suggests that it should have been more extensively adapted to marine life than Teleidosaurus and Eoneustes were, but less adapted than true metriorhynchids like Metriorhynchus and Cricosaurus, which were fully marine. The skull of Zoneait has expanded prefrontals, which support laterally-facing eyes. In combination with a streamlined skull, which is notably more derived than other non-metriorhynchid members of Metriorhynchoidea.

Mark Young and colleagues in 2024 named the clade Euthalattosuchia to unite Zoneait with the family Metriorhynchidae, with this clade containing those thalattosuchians with both cranial and postcranial adaptations to a fully marine lifestyle. The cladogram below is from their phylogenetic analysis.

- Metriorhynchoidea
  - Pelagosaurus typus
  - - Teleidosaurus calvadosii
    - - - Metriorhynchoidea indet.
        - Magyarosuchus fitosi
      - - - "Pelagosaurus" tomarensis
          - Opisuchus meieri
        - - - Eoneustes bathonicus
            - Eoneustes gaudryi
          - Euthalattosuchia
            - Chile metriorhynchoid
            - Zoneait nargorum
            - - Metriorhynchidae
                - Geosaurinae
                - Metriorhynchinae

== Paleoecology ==
The lateral-facing eyes of Zoneait, which are similar to those of metriorhynchids, differentiate it from non-marine aquatic crocodylomorphs, which have more upward-facing eyes. The shift in eye orientation is thought to reflect changes in feeding ecology; upward-facing eyes would have been adaptive for aquatic crocodylomorphs ambushing land-living prey from beneath the surface of the water, whereas side-facing eyes would have been adaptive for marine crocodylomorphs hunting in open marine environments. The forelimbs are not flattened into paddles as in metriorhynchids, but the ulna (lower arm bone) is reduced in length, indicating that forelimb reduction began at the lower limb and progressed upward (the humerus or upper arm bone of Zoneait not reduced). Taken together, the transitional features of Zoneait indicate that metriorhynchoids' adaptation of a marine lifestyle began with a shift in feeding ecology and only later involved changes in swimming locomotion.
