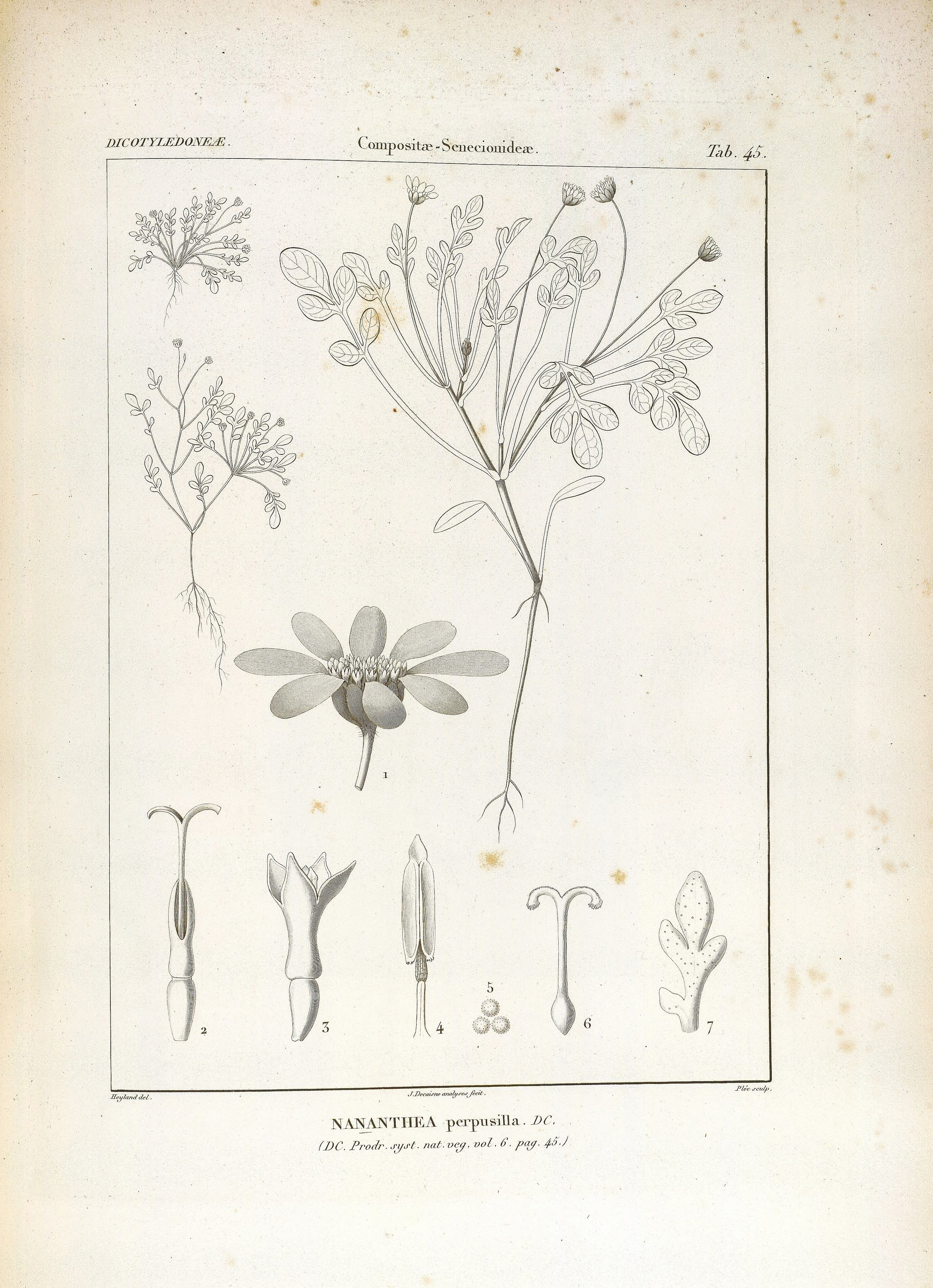
- Nananthea perpusilla

Scientific classification
- Kingdom: Plantae
- Clade: Tracheophytes
- Clade: Angiosperms
- Clade: Eudicots
- Clade: Asterids
- Order: Asterales
- Family: Asteraceae
- Subfamily: Asteroideae
- Tribe: Anthemideae
- Genus: Nananthea; DC.
- Species: N. perpusilla

Binomial name
- Nananthea perpusilla (Loisel.) DC.

Synonyms
- Chrysanthemum perpusillum Loisel.; Cotula pygmaea Poir.

= Nananthea =

Genus of flowering plants

Nananthea is a genus of flowering plants in the chamomile tribe within the daisy family.

Nananthea perpusilla is listed as "vulnerable" by IUCN.

Species

Nananthea perpusilla (Loisel.) DC. - native to Corsica and Sardinia, naturalized in parts of Germany

formerly included

- Nananthea tassiliensis Batt. & Trab. - Daveaua anthemoides Mariz
