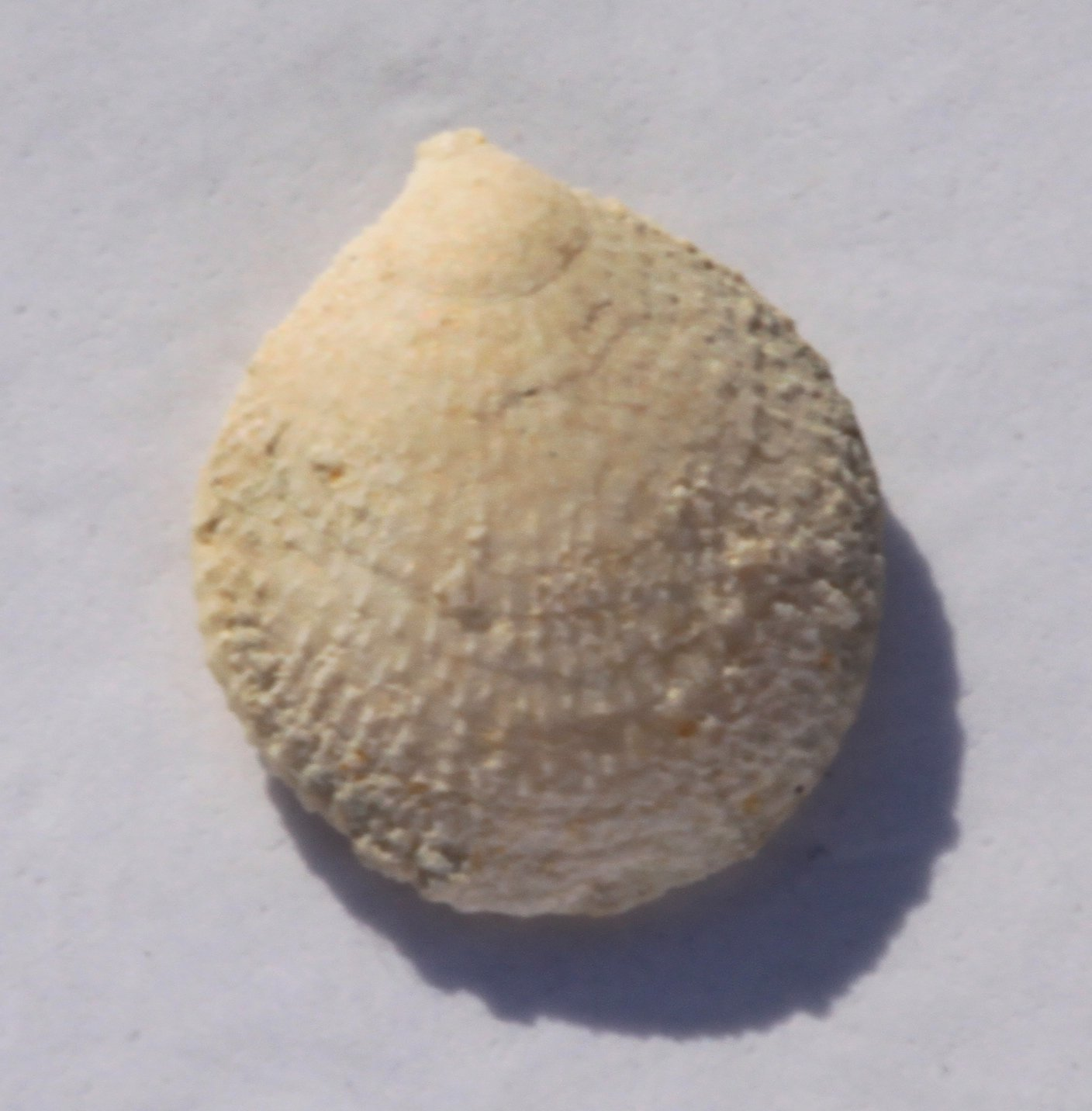
- Thecidea papillata

Scientific classification
- Kingdom: Animalia
- Phylum: Brachiopoda
- Class: Rhynchonellata
- Order: Thecideida
- Family: Thecideidae

= Thecideidae =

Family of brachiopods

Thecideidae is a family of brachiopods belonging to the order Thecideida.

== Genera ==
Genera:

- Ancorellina Mancenido & Damborenea, 1991
- Backhausina
- Danella Pajaud, 1966
- Eolacazella
- Eudesella Munier-Chalmas, 1881
- Glazewskia
- Konstantia
- Lacazella Munier-Chalmas, 1880
- Mimikonstantia Baker & Elston, 1984
- Neothecidella Pajaud, 1970
- Ospreyella Lüter & Wörheide, 2003
- PajaudinaLogan, 1998
- Parabifolium Pajaud, 1966
- Parathecidea Backhaus, 1959
- Praelacazella Smirnova, 1969
- Protolacazella Baker, 2005
- Thecidanella Ceccolini, Cianferoni, 2022
- Thecidea Defrance, 1822
- Thecidella Oehlert, 1887
- Thecidella Thomson, 1915
- Thecidiopsis Oehlert, 1887
- Vermiculothecidea
