= Thecidellina =

Scientific classification
- Domain: Eukaryota
- Kingdom: Animalia
- Phylum: Brachiopoda
- Class: Rhynchonellata
- Order: Thecideida
- Family: Thecidellinidae
- Genus: Thecidellina; Thomson, 1915

Genus of brachiopods

Thecidellina is a genus of brachiopods belonging to the family Thecidellinidae.

The species of this genus are found in Pacific and Atlantic Ocean.

Species:

- Thecidellina alabamensis Cooper, 1988
- Thecidellina bahamiensis Lüter & Logan, 2008
- Thecidellina barretti (Davidson, 1864)
- Thecidellina blochmanni Dall, 1920
- Thecidellina congregata Cooper, 1954
- Thecidellina europa Logan, Hoffmann & Lüter, 2015
- Thecidellina insolita Hoffmann, Klann & Matz, 2009
- Thecidellina japonica (Hayasaka, 1938)
- Thecidellina leipnitzae Simon, Hiller, Logan & Mottequin, 2019
- Thecidellina mawaliana Simon, Lüter, Logan & Mottequin, 2018
- Thecidellina maxilla (Hedley, 1899)
- Thecidellina meyeri Hoffmann & Lüter, 2009
- Thecidellina williamsi Lüter & Logan, 2008
