= Primula hortensis =

Flower

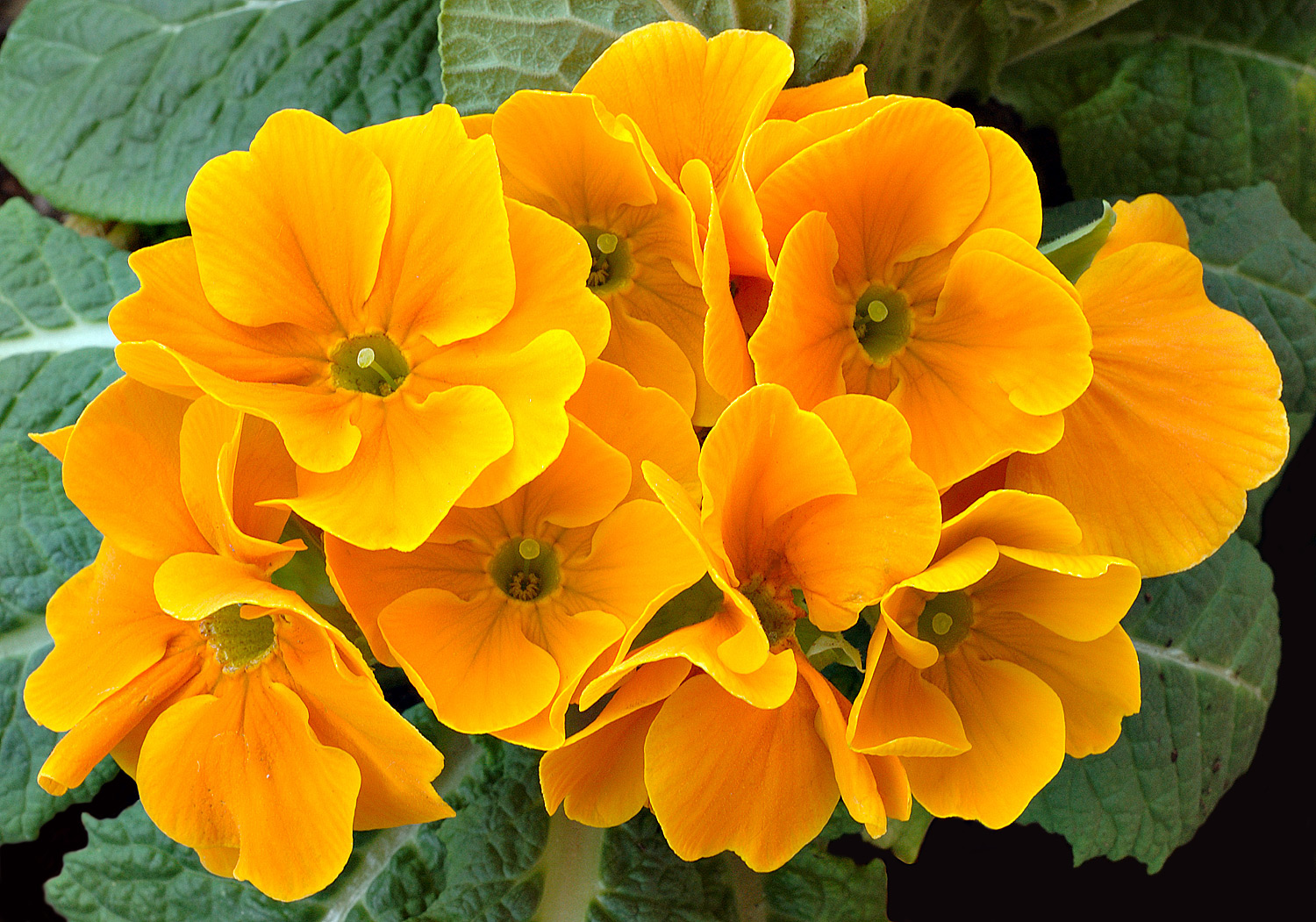

Primula hortensis is a name which has been applied to various hybrids in the genus Primula, e.g. to Primula × polyantha Mill. by Focke and to Primula × pubescens by Wittstein. The name Primula hortensis is not an accepted taxon name, however.

== Description ==
These flowers are yellowish-orange in colour.
