= Ospreyella =

Scientific classification
- Domain: Eukaryota
- Kingdom: Animalia
- Phylum: Brachiopoda
- Class: Rhynchonellata
- Order: Thecideida
- Family: Thecideidae
- Genus: Ospreyella; Lüter & Wörheide, 2003

Genus of brachiopods

Ospreyella is a genus of brachiopods belonging to the family Thecideidae.

Species:

- Ospreyella depressa Lüter & Wörheide, 2003
- Ospreyella maldiviana Logan, 2005
- Ospreyella mayottensis Simon, Hiller, Logan & Mottequin, 2019
- Ospreyella mutiara Simon & Hoffmann, 2013
- Ospreyella palauensis Logan, 2008
