= Lacazella =

Scientific classification
- Domain: Eukaryota
- Kingdom: Animalia
- Phylum: Brachiopoda
- Class: Rhynchonellata
- Order: Thecideida
- Family: Thecideidae
- Genus: Lacazella; Munier-Chalmas, 1880

Genus of brachiopods

Lacazella is a genus of brachiopods belonging to the family Thecideidae.

The genus has almost cosmopolitan distribution.

Species:

- Lacazella australis (Tate, 1880)
- Lacazella caribbeanensis Cooper, 1977
- Lacazella mauritiana Dall, 1920
- Lacazella mediterranea (Risso, 1826)
- Lacazella nana Cooper, 1988
- Lacazella novazelandiae Hiller, 2011
