= Thecidellinidae =

Scientific classification
- Domain: Eukaryota
- Kingdom: Animalia
- Phylum: Brachiopoda
- Class: Rhynchonellata
- Order: Thecideida
- Family: Thecidellinidae

Family of brachiopods

Thecidellinidae is a family of brachiopods belonging to the order Thecideida.

== Genera ==
Genera:

- Bifolium Elliott, 1948
- Bosquetella Smirnova, 1969
- Diraphora Bell, 1941
- Eothecidellina Baker, 1991
- Gacella Williams, 1962
- Kakanuiella Lee & Robinson, 2003
- Margarinifera Waagen, 1884
- Minutella Hoffmann & Lüter, 2010
- Moorellina
- Pachymorellina Baker, 1989
- Podichnus Bromley & Surlyk, 1973
- Rioultina Pajaud, 1966
- Sellithyris Middlemiss, 1959
- ThecidellinaThomson, 1915
- Tritoecia Ulrich & Cooper, 1936
