= Peipehsuchus =

Peipehsuchus Temporal range: Toarcian, 183–176 Ma

Scientific classification
- Kingdom: Animalia
- Phylum: Chordata
- Class: Reptilia
- Clade: Pseudosuchia
- Clade: Crocodylomorpha
- Suborder: †Thalattosuchia
- Parvorder: †Neothalattosuchia
- Superfamily: †Metriorhynchoidea
- Genus: †Peipehsuchus; Young, 1948
- Species: †P. teleorhinus

Binomial name
- †Peipehsuchus teleorhinus Young, 1948

Genus of reptiles

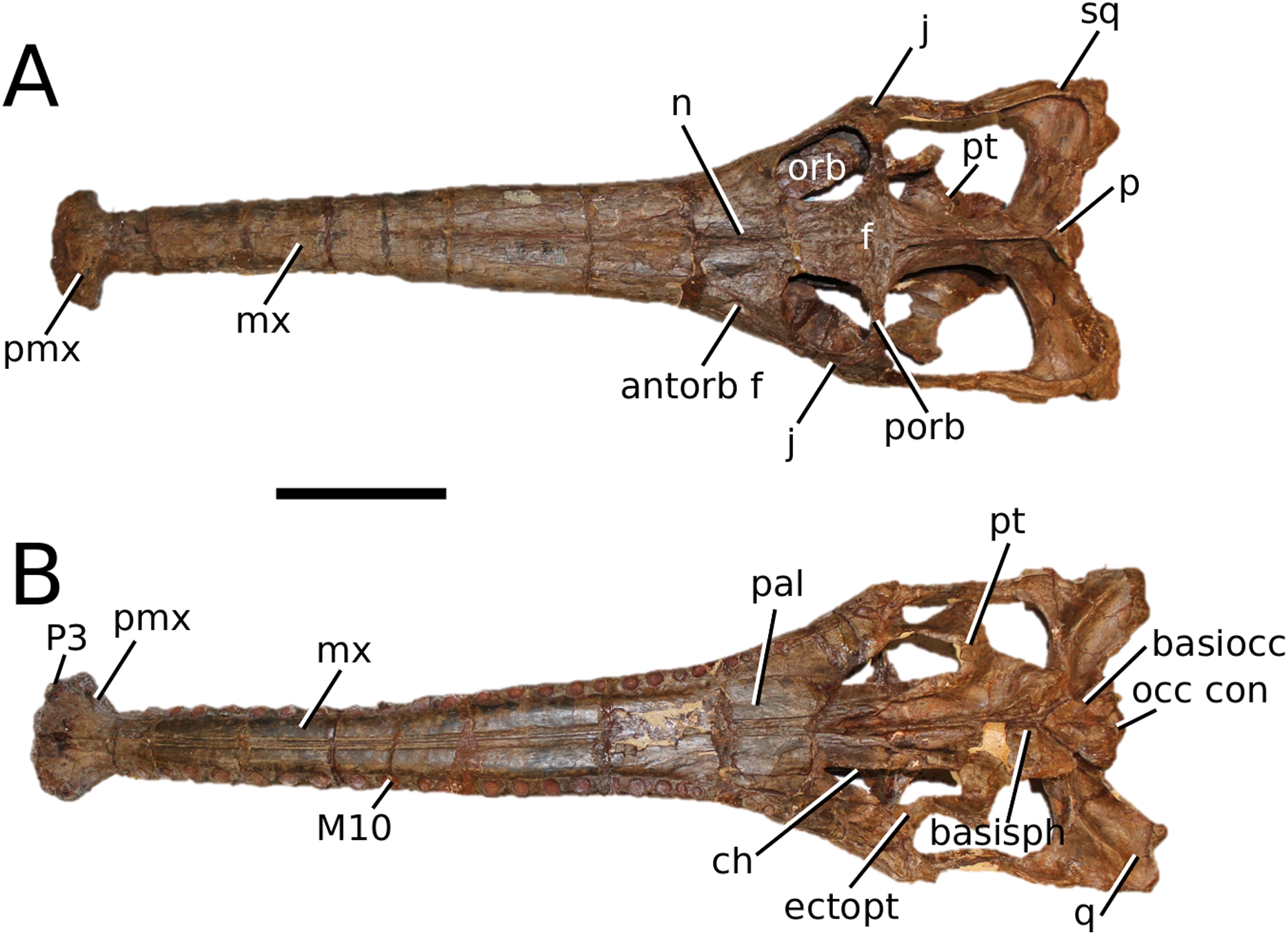
Chinese teleosauroid previously referred to as Peipehsuchus

Peipehsuchus is an extinct genus of metriorhynchoid crocodyliform from the Early Jurassic (Toarcian). The type species, P. teleorhinus, is known from China and fragmentary remains were found in the Callovian of Kyrgyzstan. The type specimen is known only by a fragmentary rostrum and teeth, and was originally believed to be a teleosaurid. A complete teleosaurid skull was referred to Peipehsuchus, however, the type specimen of Peipehsuchus has since been determined to be a metriorhynchoid and so the skull cannot belong to it.

== Sources ==
- Buffeteaut, E., 1982 "Radiation évolutive, paléoécologie et biogéographie des crocodiliens mésosuchiens". Société Géologique de France, Mémoirs 142: 1-88.
- Li, J., 1993, "A new specimen of Peipehsuchus teleorhinus from Ziliujing formation of Daxian, Sichuan": Vertebrata PalAsiatica, v. 31, n. 2, p. 85-94.
- Steel, R., 1973, Crocodylia: Handbuch der Palaoherpetologie, part 16, 116pp
