= Kakanuiella =

Scientific classification
- Domain: Eukaryota
- Kingdom: Animalia
- Phylum: Brachiopoda
- Class: Rhynchonellata
- Order: Thecideida
- Family: Thecidellinidae
- Genus: Kakanuiella; Lee & Robinson, 2003

Genus of brachiopods

Kakanuiella is a genus of brachiopods belonging to the family Thecidellinidae.

The species of this genus are found in New Zealand.

Species:

- Kakanuiella chathamensis Lüter, 2005
- Kakanuiella hedleyi Lee & Robinson, 2003
