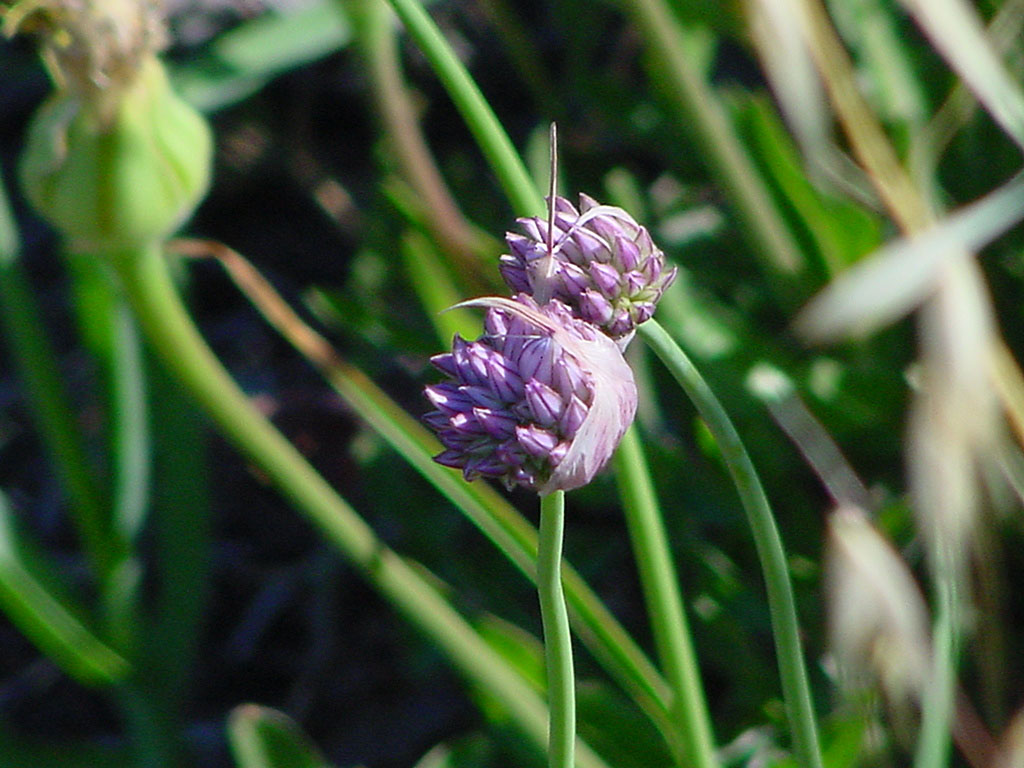

Conservation status
- Least Concern (IUCN 3.1)

Scientific classification
- Kingdom: Plantae
- Clade: Tracheophytes
- Clade: Angiosperms
- Clade: Monocots
- Order: Asparagales
- Family: Amaryllidaceae
- Subfamily: Allioideae
- Genus: Allium
- Subgenus: A. subg. Allium
- Species: A. acutiflorum

Binomial name
- Allium acutiflorum Loisel.

= Allium acutiflorum =

Aglio occidentale

Species of flowering plant

Allium acutiflorum is a plant species in the amaryllis family native to northwestern Italy (Liguria) and to southeastern France (including Corsica).

Allium acutiflorum has a single spherical bulb. Scape is up to 40 cm tall, round in cross-section. Leaves are linear, tapering toward the tip, up to 15 cm long. Umbel is spherical, with about 40 flowers. Tepals are purple with a darker purple midvein.
