= Amarasimha =

Indian poet

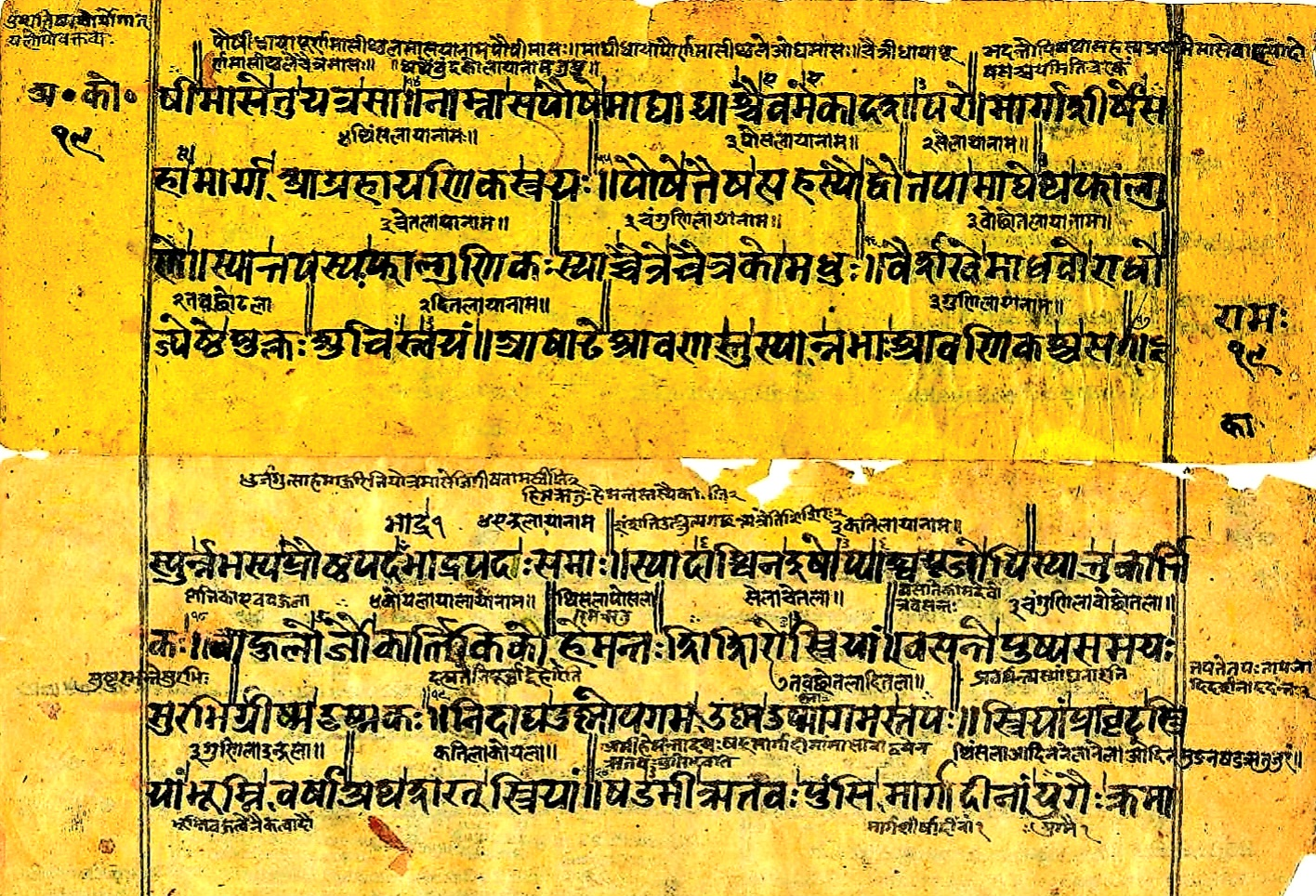
A 19th-century Amarakosha manuscript with Newar language commentary from Nepal.

Amarasimha (IAST: Amara-siṃha, c. CE 375) was a Sanskrit grammarian and poet from ancient India, of whose personal history hardly anything is known. He is said to have been "one of the nine gems that adorned the throne of Vikramaditya," and according to the evidence of Xuanzang, this is the Chandragupta Vikramaditya (Chandragupta II) who flourished about CE 375. Other sources describe him as belonging to the period of Vikramaditya of 7th century. Most of Amarasiṃha's works were lost, with the exception of the celebrated Amara-Kosha (IAST: Amarakośa) (Treasury of Amara). The first reliable mention of the Amarakosha is in the Amoghavritti of Shakatayana composed during the reign of Amoghavarsha (814-867 CE)

The Amarakosha is a lexicon of Sanskrit words in three books, and hence is sometimes called the Trikāṇḍī or the "Tripartite". It is also known as "Namalinganushasana". The Amarakosha contains 10,000 words, and is arranged, like other works of its class, in metre, to aid the memory.

The first chapter of the Kosha was printed at Rome in Tamil character in 1798. An edition of the entire work, with English notes and an index by Henry Thomas Colebrooke appeared at Serampore in 1808. The Sanskrit text was printed at Calcutta in 1831. A French translation by ALA Loiseleur-Deslongchamps was published at Paris in 1839. B. L. Rice compiled the text in Kannada script with meanings in English and Kannada in 1927.
