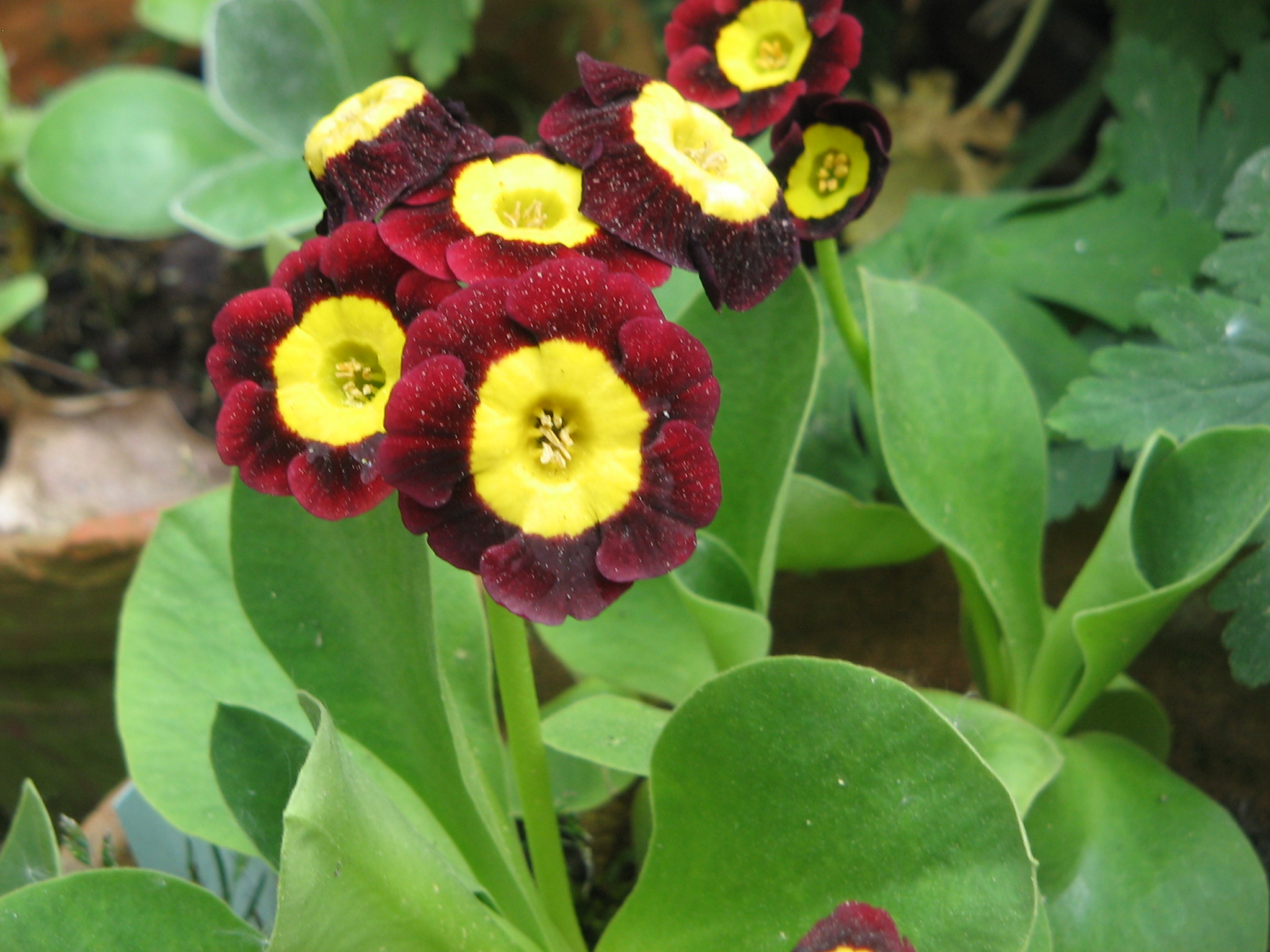
- Close-up of flowers
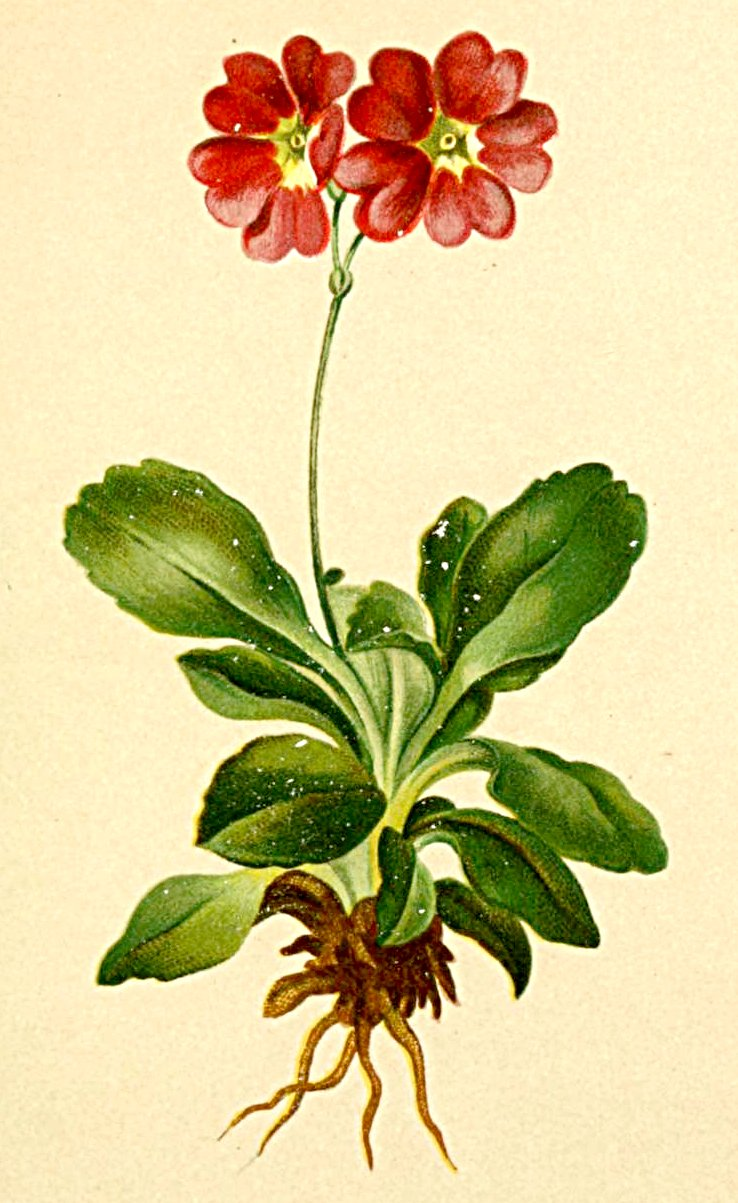
- Botanical illustration

Scientific classification
- Kingdom: Plantae
- Clade: Tracheophytes
- Clade: Angiosperms
- Clade: Eudicots
- Clade: Asterids
- Order: Ericales
- Family: Primulaceae
- Genus: Primula
- Species: P. × pubescens

Binomial name
- Primula × pubescens (Wulfen) Loisel.

Synonyms
- Primula × auriculta Kress; Primula × peyritschii Stein; Primula × rhaetica Gaudin; Primula villosa var. pubescens Wulfen

= Primula × pubescens =

Species of plant

Primula × pubescens, the garden auricula, is a naturally occurring hybrid species of flowering plant in the family Primulaceae, native to the Alps of Switzerland and Austria, and introduced to Germany. Its parents are Primula auricula (the auricula) and Primula hirsuta (the hairy primrose). A petite deciduous shrub, it can reach 12 cm (5 in) in height and width. It and its larger cultivar 'Rufus' have both gained the Royal Horticultural Society's Award of Garden Merit.

== Cultivars ==
Commercially available cultivars include:

- 'Rufus', with brick red flowers (AGM)
- 'Bewerley White', creamy-white flowers
- 'Boothman's Variety', dark pink-purple flowers
- 'Christine', purple-red flowers
- 'Cream Viscosa', cream colored flowers
- 'Faldonside', scarlet-red flowers
- 'Freedom', purple-pink flowers
- 'George Harrison'
- 'Harlow Car', creamy-white flowers
- 'Hazel's White', creamy-white flowers
- 'Henry Hall'
- 'Lilac Fairy'
- 'Pat Barwick'
- 'Sid Skelton'
- 'Sonya'
- 'The General'
- 'Wedgwood', with blue flowers
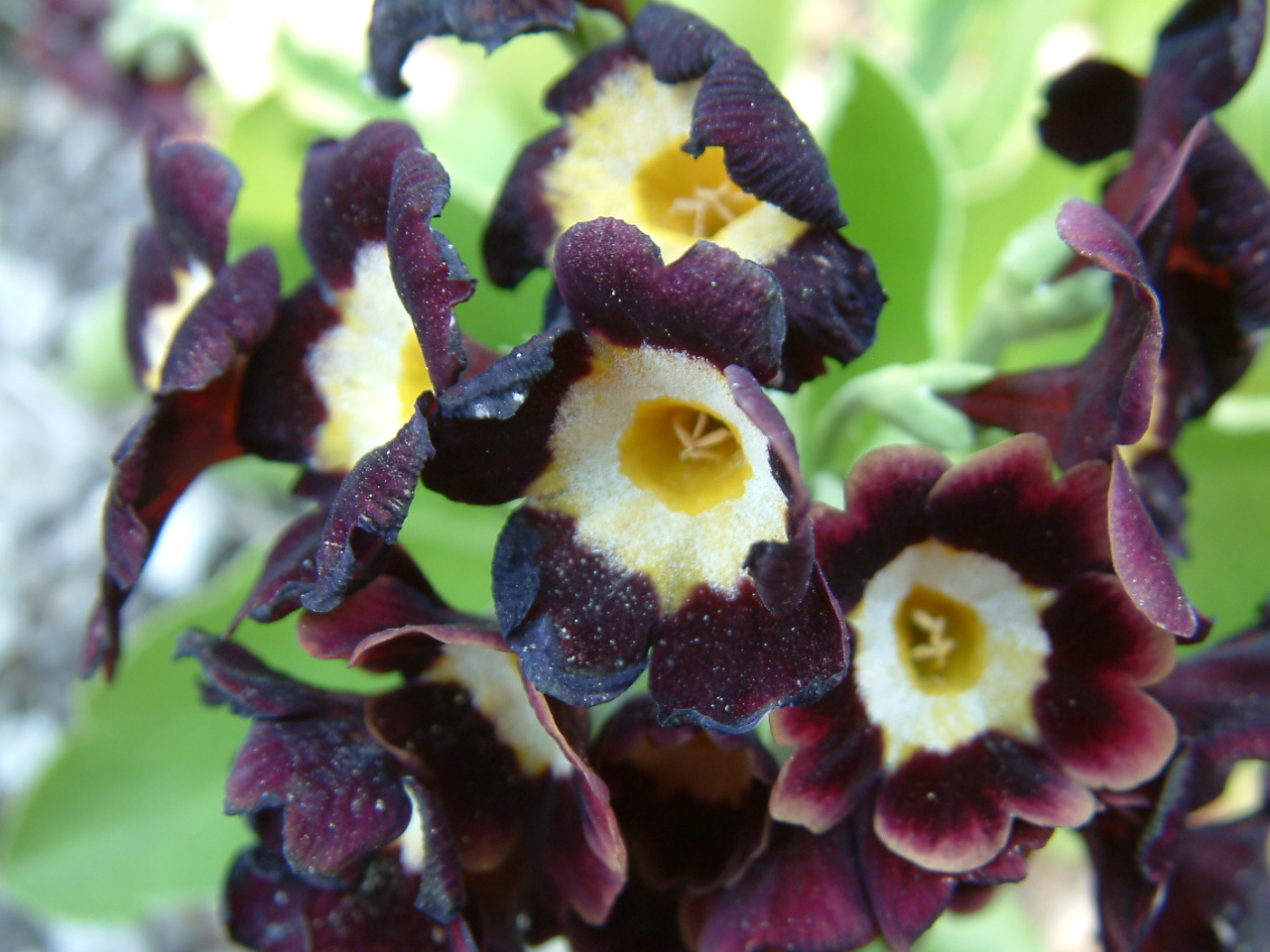
A dark-colored cultivar

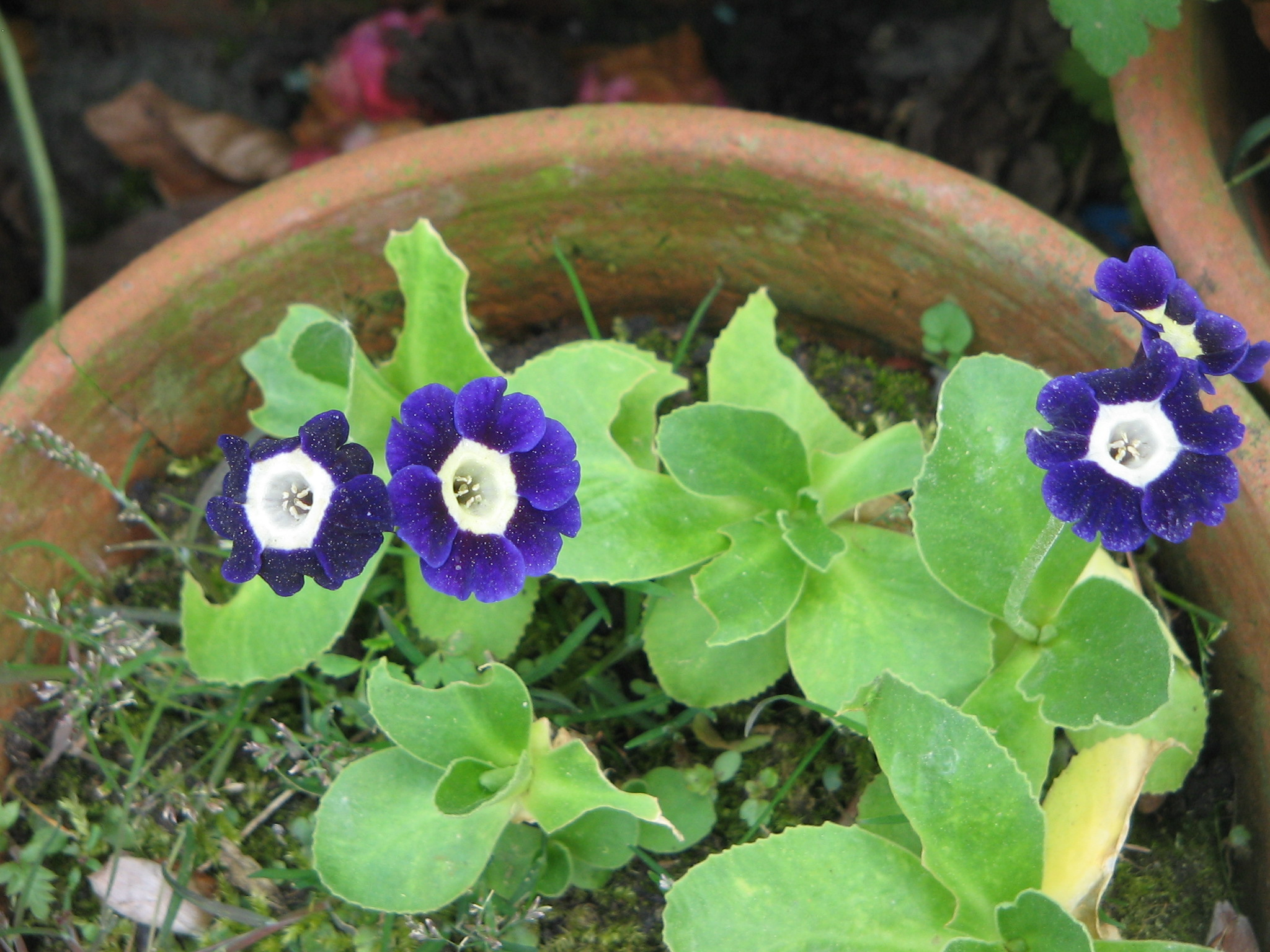
A blue cultivar

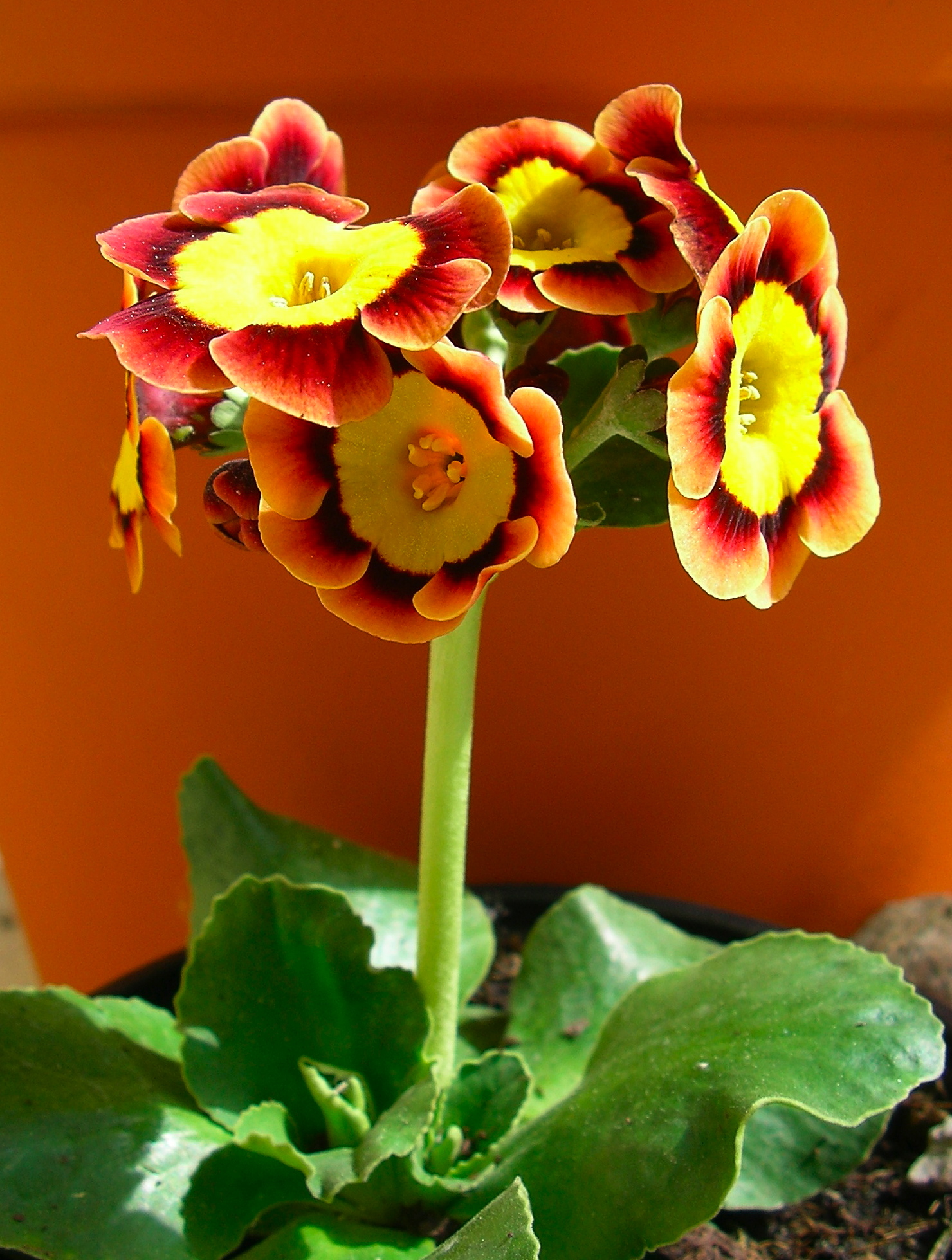
Unidentified cultivar
