= Daveaua =

Scientific classification
- Kingdom: Plantae
- Clade: Tracheophytes
- Clade: Angiosperms
- Clade: Eudicots
- Clade: Asterids
- Order: Asterales
- Family: Asteraceae
- Subfamily: Asteroideae
- Tribe: Anthemideae
- Genus: Daveaua; Willkomm ex Mariz
- Species: D. anthemoides

Binomial name
- Daveaua anthemoides Mariz

Synonyms
- Daveana, spelling variant; Nananthea tassiliensis Batt. & Trab.; Matricaria anthemoides (Mariz) Cout.

Genus of flowering plants

Daveaua is a genus of flowering plants in the daisy family.

There is only one known species, Daveaua anthemoides, native to Portugal, Spain, Andorra, Gibraltar, Morocco, and Egypt.
