= Auguste-Louis-Armand Loiseleur-Deslongchamps =

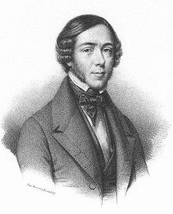
- Auguste-Louis-Armand Loiseleur-Deslongchamps
- Born: 14 August 1805; Paris
- Died: 10 January 1840; Paris

Auguste-Louis-Armand-Loiseleur Deslongchamps (or ALA Loiseleur-Deslongchamps) (14 August 1805 – 10 January 1840) was a French indologist. He was the second son of the botanist, Jean-Louis-Auguste Loiseleur-Deslongchamps. He is known for his translation of the Manusmriti and Amara Sinha's Amara-Kosha.
