= Eugène Eudes-Deslongchamps =

French paleontologist and naturalist (1830–1889)

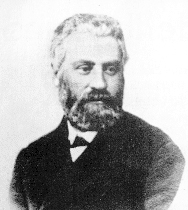
- Born: 10 March 1830
- Died: 21 December 1889 (aged 59)
- Scientific career
- Fields: Paleontology, Natural history
- Theses: Études sur les étages jurassiques inférieurs de la Normandie (1864); Recherches sur l'organisation du manteau dans les brachiopodes articulés (1864)

Eugène Eudes-Deslongchamps (French pronunciation: [øʒɛn ød delɔ̃ʃɑ̃]; 10 March 1830 – 21 December 1889) was a French paleontologist and naturalist born in Caen, the son of paleontologist Jacques Amand Eudes-Deslongchamps (1794–1867). He died at Château Matthieu, Calvados.

Around 1856 he succeeded his father as professor of zoology at the faculty of sciences at the University of Caen, later becoming a professor of geology and dean (1861). After the death of his father in 1867, he devoted himself to the completion of a memoir on the teleosaurs, the joint labours being embodied in his Prodrome des Téléosauriens du Calvados. He contributed several of his memoirs to the Société Linnéenne de Normandie.

== Selected writings ==
- Mémoire sur les genres Leptaena et Thecidea des terrains jurassiques du Calvados, (1853–59) – Memoir on the genera Leptaena and Thecidea in the Jurassic strata of Calvados.
- Mémoire sur les fossiles de Montreuil-Bellay (Maine-et-Loire), (1860 with M Hébert) – Memoir on fossils of Montreuil-Bellay (Maine-et-Loire).
- Etudes sur les étages jurassiques inférieurs de la Normandie, (1864) – Studies on the lower Jurassic strata of Normandy.
- Documents sur la géologie de la Nouvelle-Calédonie, (1864) – Documents on the geology of New Caledonia.
- Recherches sur l'organisation du manteau chez les Brachipodes articule´s et principalement sur les spicules calcaires contenus dans son interieur, (1864) – Research on the organization of the mantle in articulated brachiopods, mainly on calcareous spicules, etc.
- Notes sur les Téléosauriens, (1867) – Notes on Teleosauridae.
- Le Jura normand. Études paléontologiques des divers niveaux jurassiques de la Normandie, comprenant la description et l'iconographie de tous les fossiles vertébrés et invertébrés qu'ils renfement, (1877) – The Jura Normand. Paleontological studies of various Jurassic layers in Normandy, including descriptions and illustrations of fossil vertebrates and invertebrates.
