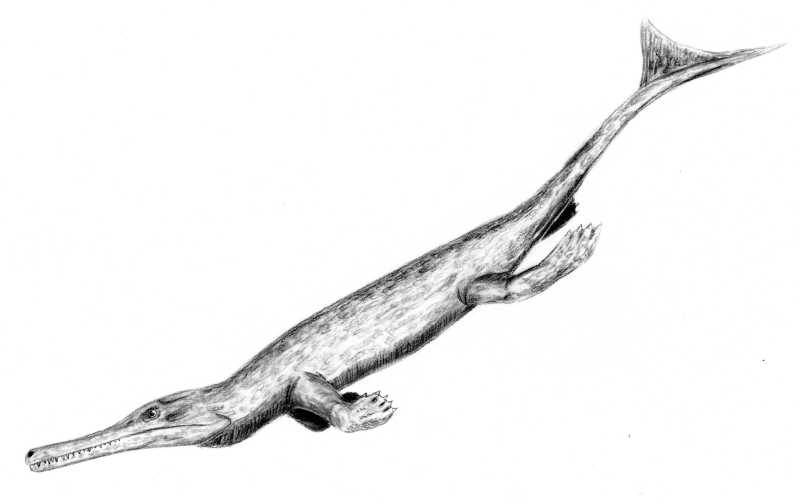
- Restoration of Teleidosaurus calvadosii

Scientific classification
- Kingdom: Animalia
- Phylum: Chordata
- Class: Reptilia
- Clade: Pseudosuchia
- Clade: Crocodylomorpha
- Suborder: †Thalattosuchia
- Parvorder: †Neothalattosuchia
- Superfamily: †Metriorhynchoidea; Fitzinger, 1843

Subgroups
- †Eoneustes; †Magyarosuchus; †Opisuchus; †Pelagosaurus; †Teleidosaurus; †Euthalattosuchia; †Zoneait; †Metriorhynchidae

= Metriorhynchoidea =

Metriorhynchoids Temporal range: Early Jurassic-Early Cretaceous, Toarcian–Aptian

Extinct superfamily of reptiles

Metriorhynchoidea is an extinct superfamily of thalattosuchian crocodyliforms from the Early Jurassic to the Early Cretaceous (Toarcian - Valanginian, possibly as late as early Aptian) of Europe, North America and South America. Metriorhynchids are fully aquatic crocodyliforms. Named by Fitzinger, in 1843, it contains the basal taxa like Teleidosaurus, Zoneait and Eoneustes and the family Metriorhynchidae. An unnamed taxon is known from Chile.

== Phylogeny ==
Metriorhynchoidea is a stem-based taxon defined in the PhyloCode by Mark T. Young and colleagues in 2024 as "the largest clade within Thalattosuchia containing Metriorhynchus brevirostris, but not Teleosaurus cadomensis and Macrospondylus bollensis". The more derived clade Euthalattosuchia was named by Young and colleagues in 2024 to contain those thalattosuchians with both cranial and postcranial adaptations to a fully marine lifestye. It is defined in the PhyloCode as the "smallest clade within Metriorhynchoidea containing Zoneait nargorum and Thalattosuchus superciliosus. The cladogram below follows the topology from a 2011 analysis by Andrea Cau and Federico Fanti. Note that the same topology was obtained in Mark T. Young and Marco Brandalise de Andrade, 2009 and Mark T. Young, Stephen L. Brusatte, Marcello Ruta and Marco Brandalise de Andrade, 2010.

- Metriorhynchoidea
  - Teleidosaurus calvadosii
  - - - Eoneustes bathonicus
      - Eoneustes gaudryi
    - - Metriorhynchoidea indet.
      - - Zoneait
        - - Metriorhynchidae
            - Geosaurinae
            - Metriorhynchinae
