= Eoneustes =

Eoneustes Temporal range: Bajocian - Bathonian, 168.5–167 Ma

Scientific classification
- Domain: Eukaryota
- Kingdom: Animalia
- Phylum: Chordata
- Class: Reptilia
- Clade: Archosauria
- Clade: Pseudosuchia
- Clade: Crocodylomorpha
- Suborder: †Thalattosuchia
- Superfamily: †Metriorhynchoidea
- Genus: †Eoneustes; Young et al., 2010

Species
- E. bathonicus (Mercier, 1933 [originally Metriorhynchus]); E. gaudryi (Collot, 1905 [originally Teleidosaurus]) (type)

Extinct genus of reptiles

Eoneustes (meaning "dawn swimmer") is an extinct genus of metriorhynchoid crocodyliform from Middle Jurassic (late Bajocian to early Bathonian stage) deposits of France. Eoneustes was a carnivore that lived in the oceans and spent much, if not all, its life out at sea.

== Discovery and species ==
- E. bathonicus: Western Europe (France) of the Middle Jurassic (early Bathonian). It is known from holotype from Calvados of Normandy, that was lost during the Second World War.
- E. gaudryi: Western Europe (France) of the Middle Jurassic (late Bajocian to early Bathonian). It is known from the holotype NHM R.3353, a partial skull from Côte d’Or, Burgundy and the referred specimen from which housed at Université Claude Bernard Lyon I, F.S.L. 330210, another partial skull from Alpes-de-Haute-Provence, France.
