= Jacques Amand Eudes-Deslongchamps =

French naturalist and paleontologist (1794–1867)

Jacques Amand Eudes-Deslongchamps (French pronunciation: [ʒak amɑ̃ ød delɔ̃ʃɑ̃]; 17 January 1794 – 17 January 1867) was a French naturalist and paleontologist. His son, Eugène Eudes-Deslongchamps (1830–1889), was also a paleontologist.

He was born at Caen in Normandy. His parents, though poor, contrived to give him a good education, and he studied medicine in his native town to such good effect that in 1812 he was appointed assistant-surgeon in the navy, and in 1815 surgeon assistant major to the military hospital of Caen. Soon afterwards he proceeded to Paris to qualify for the degree of doctor of surgery, and there the researches and teachings of Cuvier attracted his attention to subjects of natural history and palaeontology.

In 1822 he was elected surgeon to the board of relief at Caen, and while he never ceased to devote his energies to the duties of this post, he sought relaxation in geological studies. Soon he discovered remains of Teleosaurus in one of the Caen quarries, and he became an ardent palaeontologist. He was one of the founders of the museum of natural history at Caen, and acted as honorary curator; he was likewise one of the founders of the Socité linnenne de Normandie (1823), to the transactions of which society he communicated papers on Teleosaurus, Poekilopleuron (Megalosaurus), on Jurassic mollusca and brachiopoda. In 1825 he became professor of zoology to the faculty of sciences, and in 1847, dean.
