= Pelagosaurus =

Pelagosaurus Temporal range: 183–176 Ma Toarcian
- Skull diagram
- Skeletal reconstruction

Scientific classification
- Kingdom: Animalia
- Phylum: Chordata
- Class: Reptilia
- Clade: Pseudosuchia
- Clade: Crocodylomorpha
- Suborder: †Thalattosuchia
- Superfamily: †Metriorhynchoidea
- Genus: †Pelagosaurus; Bronn, 1841
- Species: †P. typus

Binomial name
- †Pelagosaurus typus Bronn, 1841

Synonyms
- Mosellaesaurus Monard, 1846

Extinct genus of reptiles

Pelagosaurus (meaning "lizard of the open sea") is an extinct genus of thalattosuchian crocodyliform that lived during the Toarcian stage of the Lower Jurassic, around 183 to 176 million years ago, in shallow epicontinental seas that covered much of what is now Western Europe. The systematic taxonomy of Pelagosaurus has been disputed over the years, usually being placed as a teleosauroid (gharial-like, armoured marine crocodyliformes), but with later thorough analyses consistently recovering it as a basal metriorhynchoid (a clade containing the fully-pelagic, flippered thalattosuchians with smooth skin and caudal fins). Pelagosaurus was a small reptile, usually measuring less than 2 metres (6.6 ft) long amongst the several known specimens.

== Discovery ==
Fossil specimen (FWD 0784) of P. typus with a pathologically bent lower jaw that healed during life.

Pelagosaurus was originally described from a specimen from Normandy, but the holotype for P. typus was discovered north of the town of Ilminster in Somerset, England. Most Pelagosaurus remains have been found in the Ilminster area, but numerous other remains, predominantly skulls and articulated skeletons, have been found around Western Europe in locations such as France, Germany, and Switzerland, with a 2006 dissertation listing a total of 88 specimens. Specimens from the Somerset region come primarily from the Strawberry Bank quarry north of Ilminster; although the site had yielded other fossil remains before, the site has since been built over. Several of the specimens are those of small juveniles, providing some insight into Pelagosaurus' growth pattern.

== Evolutionary relationships ==
Size comparison of a few P. typus specimens.

The evolutionary relationships of Pelagosaurus have historically been contentious as there have been several different interpretations of its placement in Thalattosuchia.

Pelagosaurus was initially classified as a teleosaurid, based upon anatomical similarity, by Eudes-Deslongchamps, Westphal and Duffin. It was suggested to be an early-diverging metriorhynchid by Eric Buffetaut in 1980. Phylogenetic analyses from the 1980s, 1990s and early 2000s found Pelagosaurus to be the sister taxon to both Teleosauridae and Metriorhynchidae. With subsequent studies from the late 2010s and early 2020s finding it to be a basal metriorhynchoid, whose superficial similarities with teleosauroids are actually plesiomorphies (ancestral characters) of thalattosuchia (like the presence of - albeit reduced - osteoderm coverage, a mandibular fenestra, or more than 3 premaxillary teeth).

== Palaeobiology ==
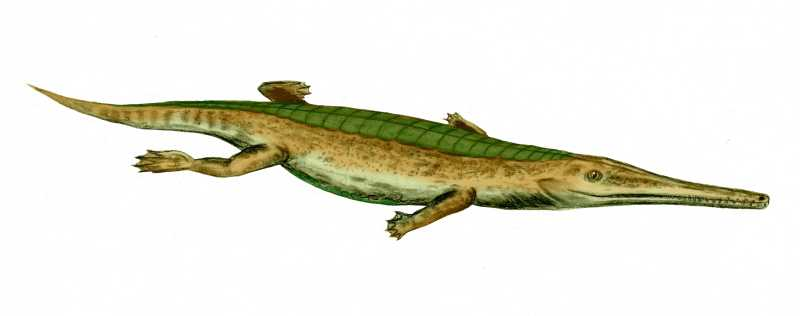
Restoration

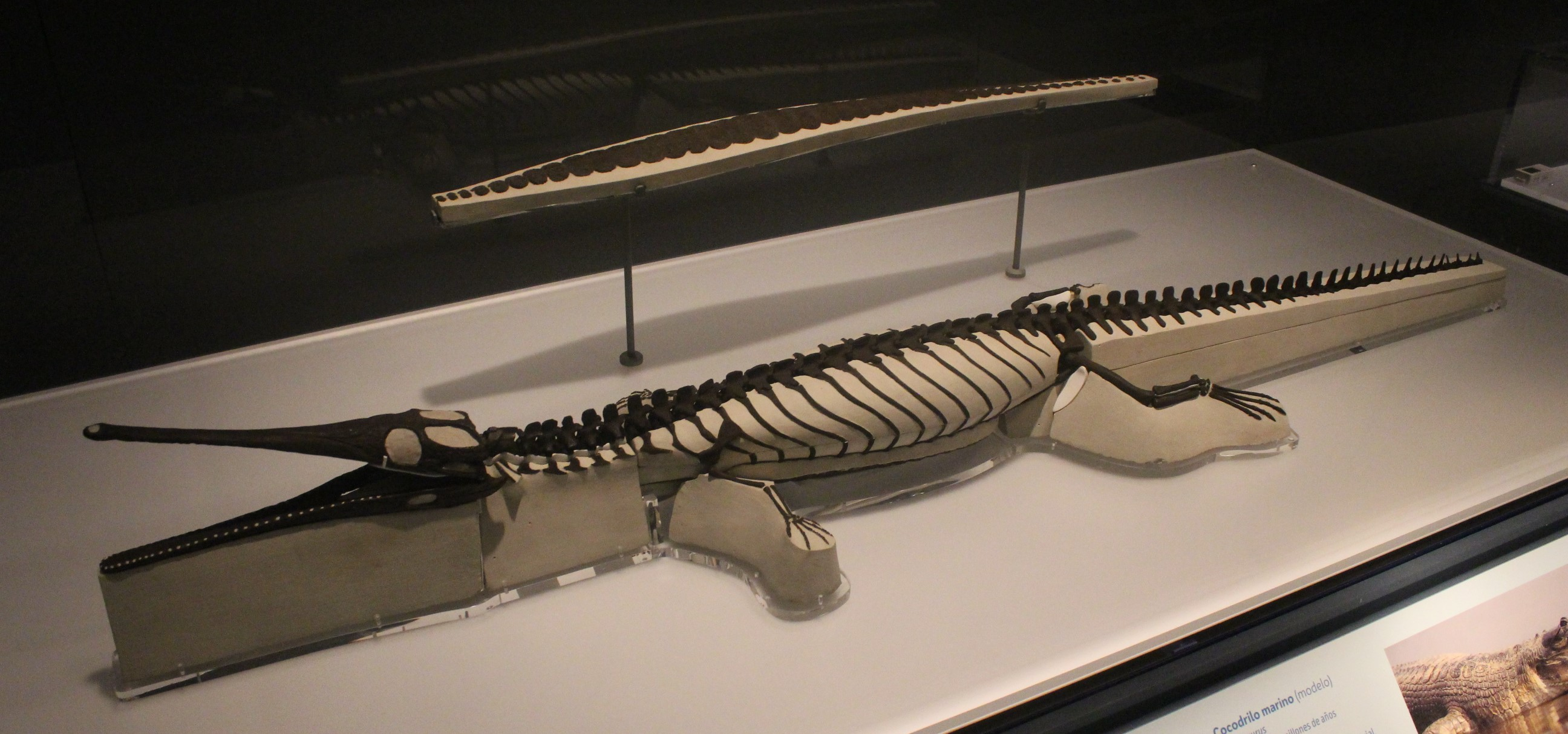
Display of a P. typus skeleton cast at the Field Museum of Natural History, many parts are sculpted.

Pelagosaurus was well-adapted to aquatic life; it had developed a long snout (between 70-76% the total length of the skull, depending on the specimen) with more than 60 needle-like teeth on the upper and lower jaws, an elongated and slender body with very small limbs, which streamlined the animal for swimming in the warm, shallow waters of its environment. It fed on fish, crustaceans and insects whilst swimming; indeed, one very young fossil specimen was found with a Leptolepis— an early teleost fish— in its stomach contents. Its morphology indicates Pelagosaurus was a pursuit predator with laterally-facing eyes, rather than a scavenger or ambush hunter like many teleosauroids or modern crocodilians with dorsally-positioned orbits. Pelagosaurus was markedly similar to modern crocodiles, and likely swam in similar manner, whipping its tail from side to side, although its veterbral structure was slightly more agile, probably allowing for more movement in the water than its modern equivalents. Pelagosaurus would have only emerged from the water to lay eggs or to rest on the banks, and would have spent the rest of its day in the water for which it was adapted.

Comparisons with other crocodilians shows it was a small prey specialist, less suited to tackle large prey than even modern gharials.

== See also ==
- List of marine reptiles
