= Opisuchus =

Opisuchus Temporal range: Middle Jurassic, 175.6–171.6 Ma

Scientific classification
- Kingdom: Animalia
- Phylum: Chordata
- Class: Reptilia
- Clade: Archosauria
- Clade: Pseudosuchia
- Clade: Crocodylomorpha
- Suborder: †Thalattosuchia
- Superfamily: †Metriorhynchoidea
- Genus: †Opisuchus; Aiglstorfer et al., 2019

Type species
- Opisuchus meieri Aiglstorfer et al., 2019

Extinct genus of crocodyliform

Opisuchus is an extinct genus of metriorhynchoid crocodyliform known from the Middle Jurassic Opalinuston Formation of Germany. It contains a single species, O. meieri.
