= Jean-Louis-Auguste Loiseleur-Deslongchamps =

French physician and botanist

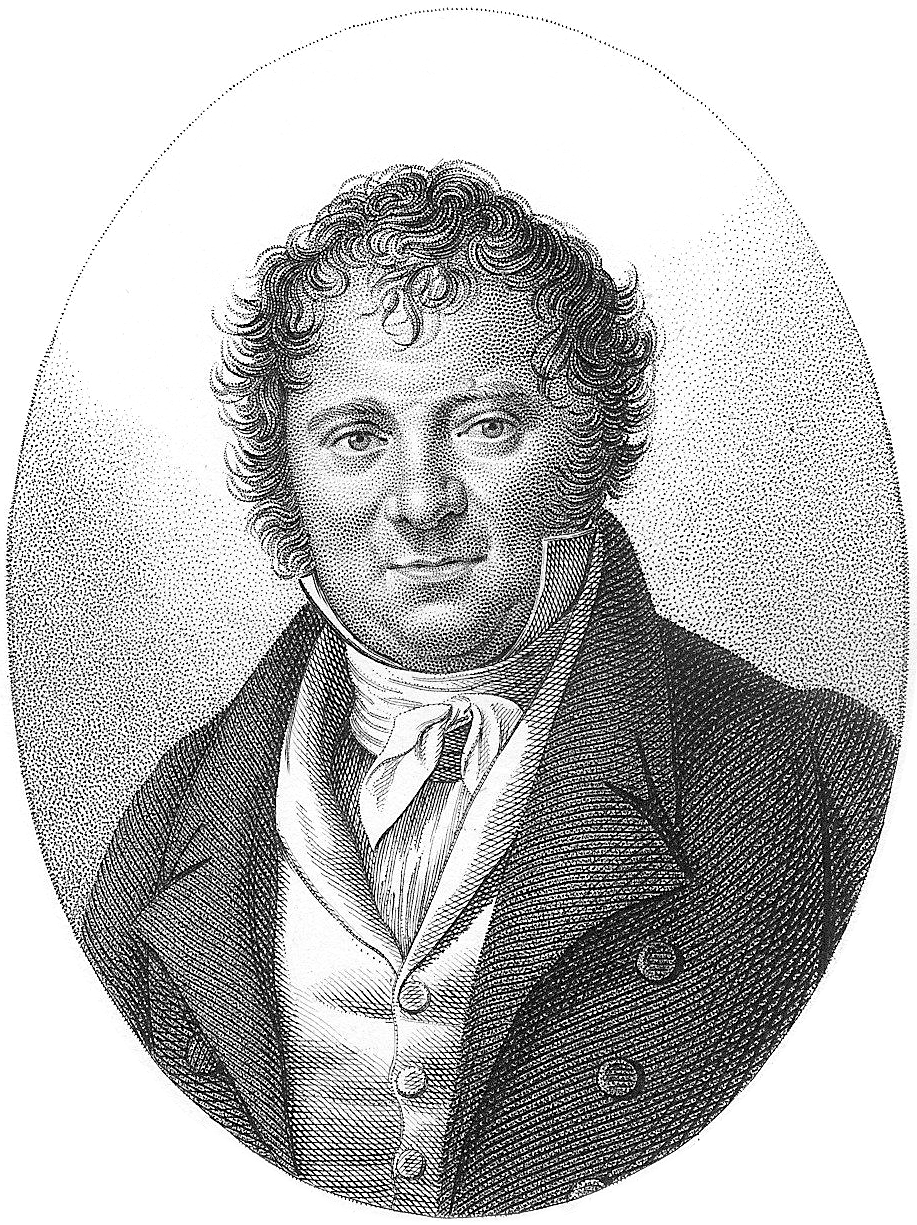
- Born: 24 March 1774; Dreux, Kingdom of France
- Died: 8 May 1849 (aged 75); Paris, France
- Awards: Legion of Honour
- Scientific career
- Fields: Botany
- Author abbrev. (botany): Loisel.

Jean-Louis-Auguste Loiseleur-Deslongchamps (24 March 1774, in Dreux, Eure-et-Loir – 8 May 1849, in Paris) was a French medical doctor and botanist. The standard author abbreviation Loisel. is used to indicate this person as the author when citing a botanical name.

He was the author of and contributor to a number of works on medicine and botany. He was elected to the Académie Nationale de Médecine in 1823 and was made a Chevalier of the Legion of Honour in 1834.

He is commemorated with the botanical genera Loiseleuria (Desv., 1813) and Longchampia (Willd., 1811). His son was the Indologist, Auguste-Louis-Armand Loiseleur-Deslongchamps.

== Selected works ==
- "Flora Gallica, seu Enumeratio plantarum in Gallia sponte nascentium", 1806 (second edition 1828).
- Nouveau voyage dans l'empire de Flore, ou Principes élémentaires de botanique, Paris : Méquignon, 1817.
- Flore générale de France, ou Iconographie, description et histoire de toutes les plantes phanérogames, cryptogames et agames qui croissent dans ce royaume, disposées suivant les familles naturelles, 1828–29 (with Christiaan Hendrik Persoon, Benjamin Gaillon, Jean Baptiste Boisduval and Louis Alphonse de Brébisson).
- Considérations sur les céréales, et principalement sur les froments, Paris : Libraire de Madame V. Bouchard-Huzard, 1842–1843.
