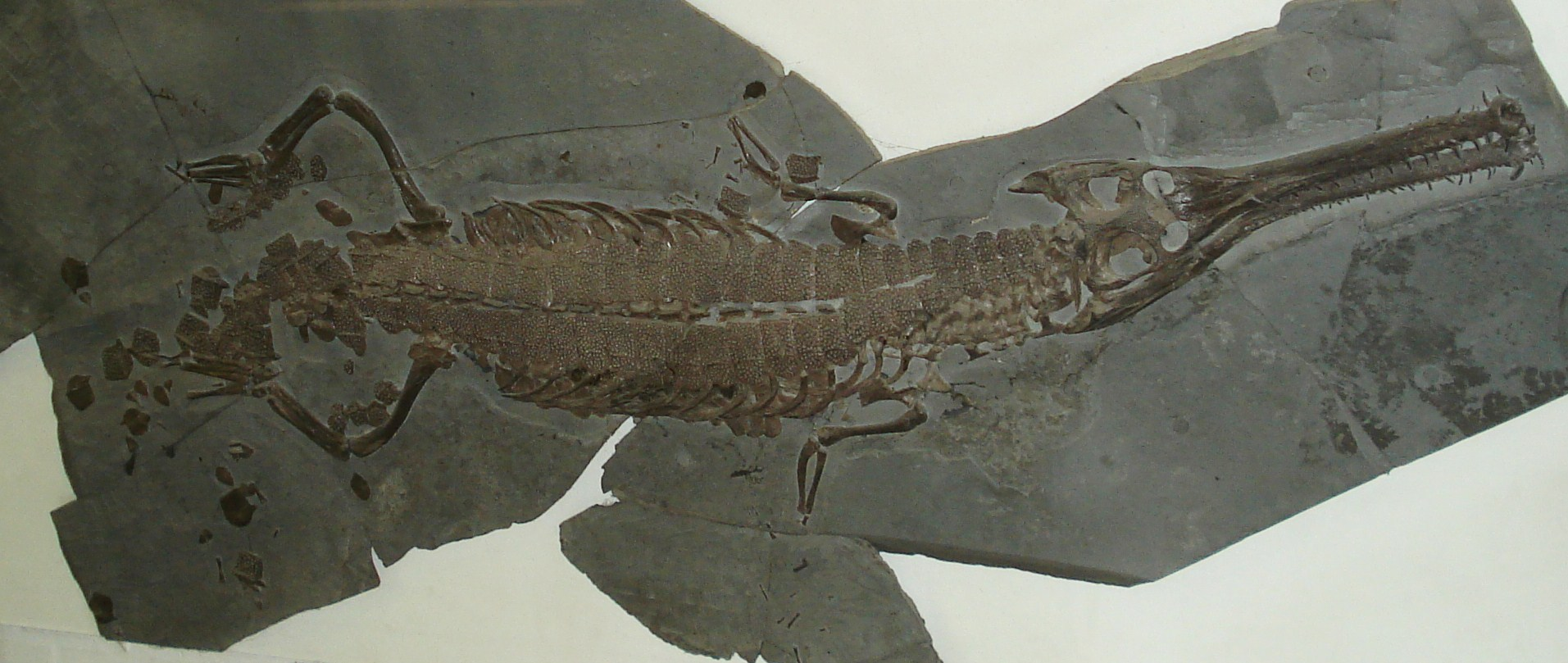
- Platysuchus,(Teleosauridae, Teleosauroidea)
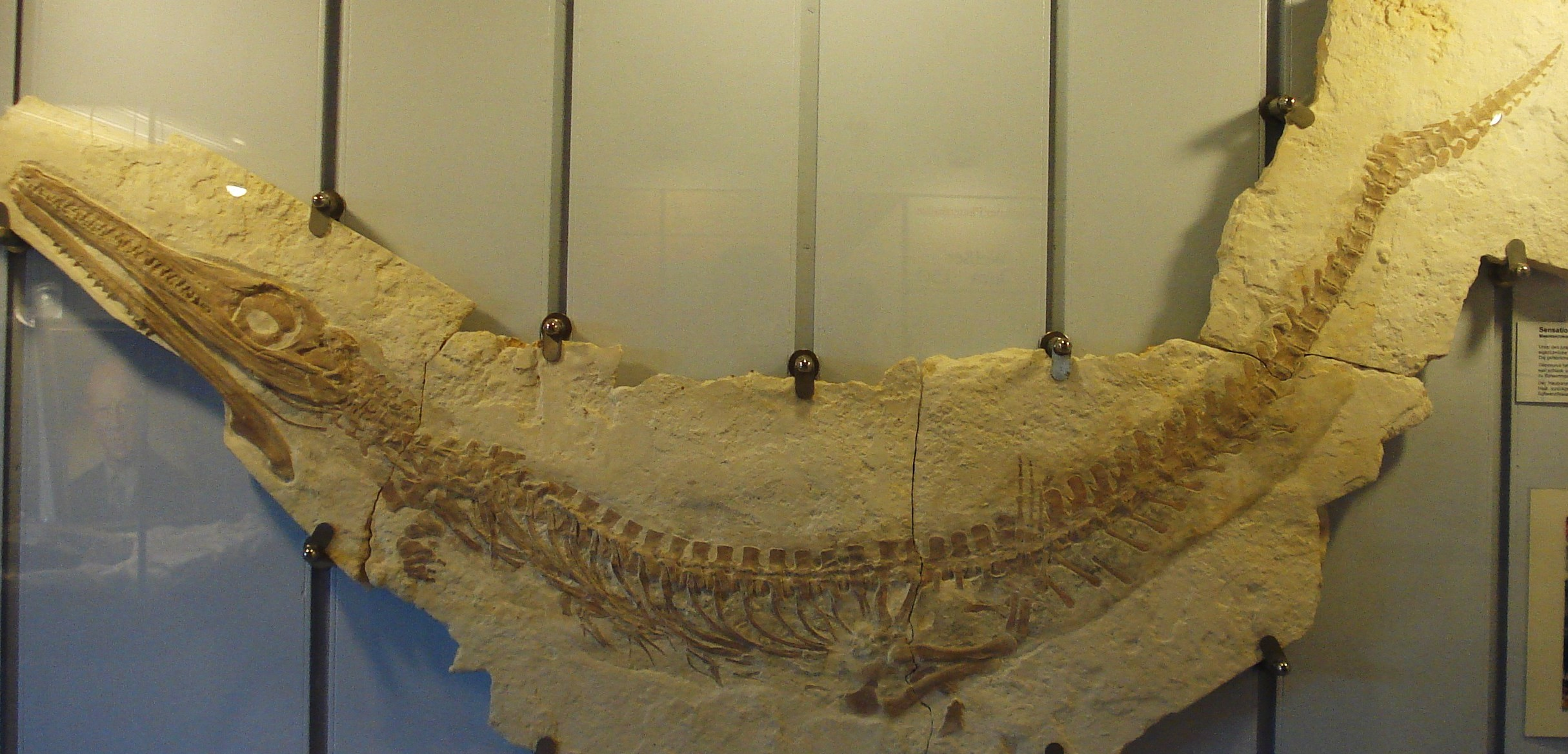
- Cricosaurus (Metriorhynchidae, Metriorhynchoidea)

Scientific classification
- Kingdom: Animalia
- Phylum: Chordata
- Class: Reptilia
- Clade: Archosauria
- Clade: Pseudosuchia
- Clade: Crocodylomorpha
- Clade: Crocodyliformes
- Suborder: †Thalattosuchia; Fraas, 1901

Superfamilies
- †Eopneumatosuchus?; †Plagiophthalmosuchus?; †Turnersuchus; †Neothalattosuchia; †Pelagosaurus; †Metriorhynchoidea; †Teleosauroidea

= Thalattosuchia =

Thalattosuchians Temporal range: Early Jurassic-Early Cretaceous Sinemurian–Aptian

Clade of marine crocodylomorphs

Thalattosuchia is a clade of mostly marine crocodylomorphs from the Early Jurassic to the Early Cretaceous that had a cosmopolitan distribution. They are colloquially referred to as marine crocodiles or sea crocodiles, though they are not members of Crocodilia and records from Thailand and China suggest that some members lived in freshwater. The clade contains two major subgroupings, the Teleosauroidea and Metriorhynchoidea. Teleosauroids are not greatly specialised for oceanic life, with back osteoderms similar to other crocodyliformes. Within Metriorhynchoidea, the Metriorhynchidae displayed extreme adaptions for life in the open ocean, including the transformation of limbs into flippers, the development of a tail fluke, and smooth, scaleless skin, and probably gave live birth, seemingly uniquely among archosaurs.

== Taxonomy ==
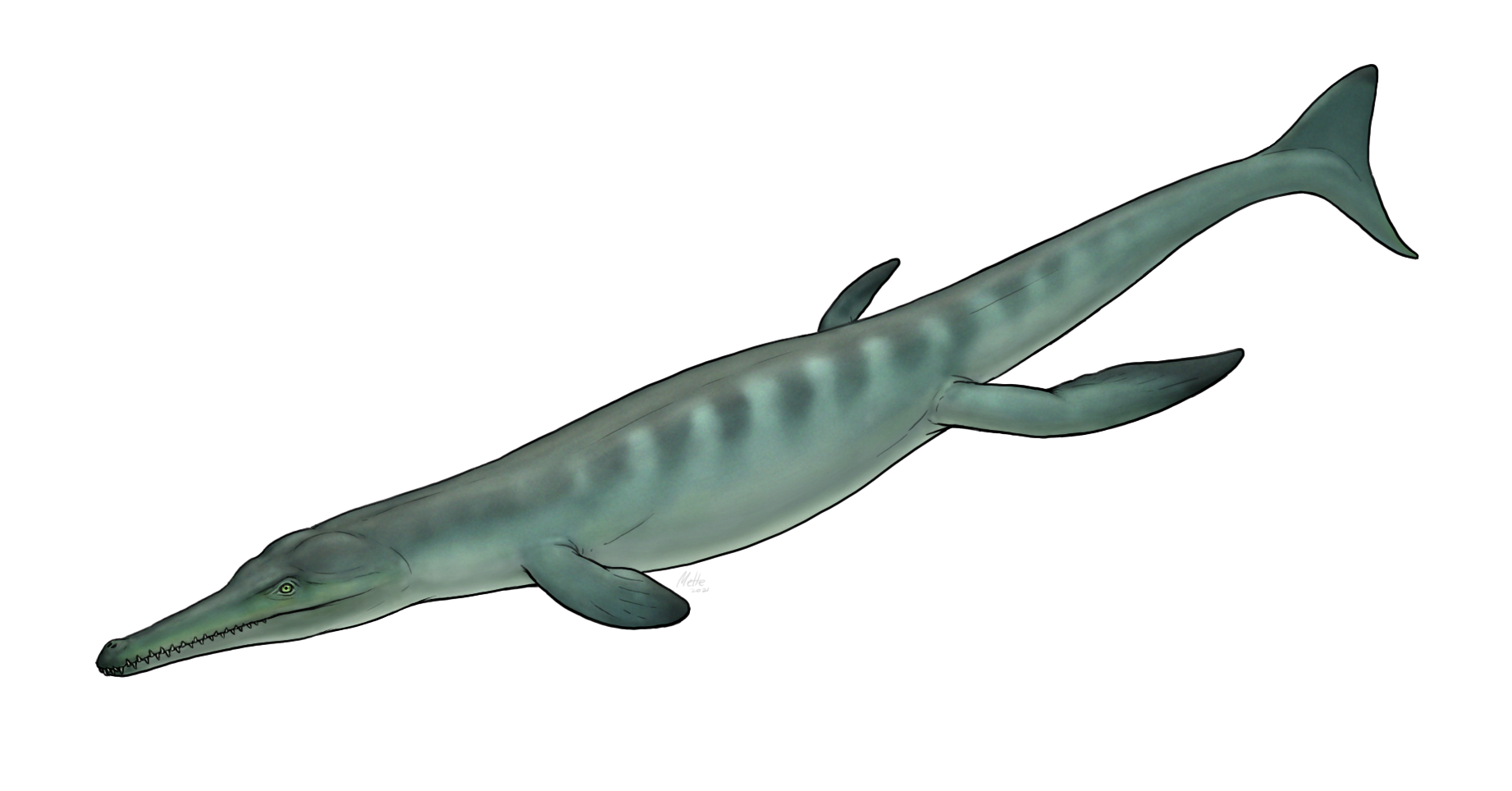
Life restoration of Metriorhynchus brevirostris (Metriorhynchidae, Metriorhynchoidea)

Life restoration of Machimosaurus (Machimosauridae, Teleosauroidea)

The term Thalattosuchia was coined by Fraas in 1901. The term is derived from the Greek words θάλαττα, meaning sea, and σοῦχος crocodile. Various authors considered Thalattosuchia an infraorder or a suborder within "Mesosuchia". However, the term "Mesosuchia" is a paraphyletic group, and as such is no longer used. For consistency, the Thalattosuchia are here placed at suborder rank, although the order that contains it is unnamed. The exact phylogenetic position of Thalattosuchia is uncertain, with them either being interpreted as members of Neosuchia alongside other aquatic crocodylomorphs, or more basal members of Crocodylomorpha, with the similarities to neosuchians being as a result of convergent evolution. Mark T. Young and colleagues in 2024 defined Thalattosuchia in the PhyloCode as "the largest clade within Crocodylomorpha containing Macrospondylus bollensis and Thalattosuchus superciliosus, but not Protosuchus richardsoni, Notosuchus terrestris, Peirosaurus tormini, Anteophthalmosuchus hooleyi, Deltasuchus motherali, Pholidosaurus schaumburgensis, Dyrosaurus phosphaticus, and Crocodylus niloticus (the Nile crocodile)". 'The group contains basal taxa such as Turnersuchus and Plagiophthalmosuchus and the two main groups Metriorhynchoidea and Teleosauroidea. Those two groups are united in the clade Neothalattosuchia, named and defined in the PhyloCode by Mark T. Young and colleagues in 2024 as "the smallest clade within Thalattosuchia containing Macrospondylus bollensis, Platysuchus multiscrobiculatus, Pelagosaurus typus, and Thalattosuchus superciliosus.

== Evolutionary history ==
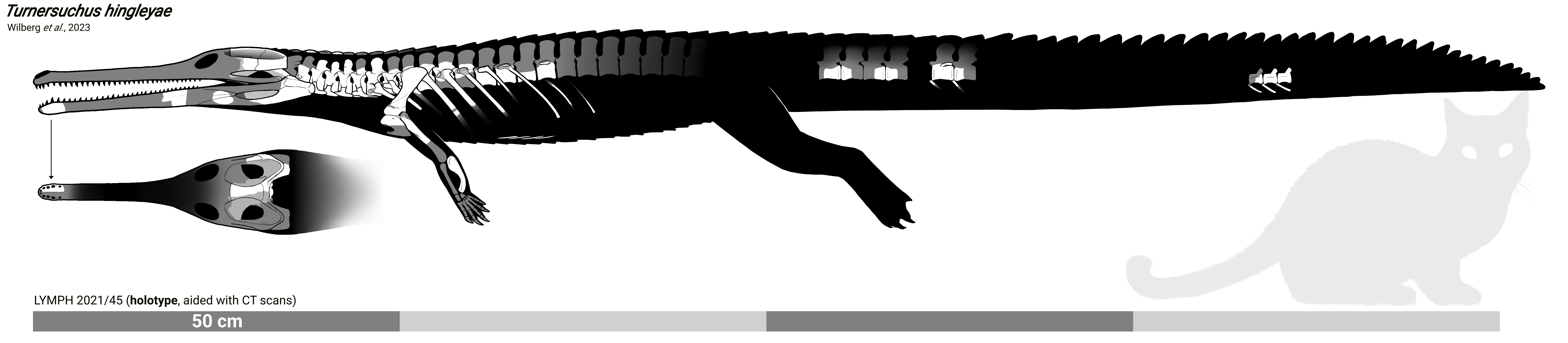
Skeletal reconstruction of Turnersuchus, currently regarded as the basal-most member of Thalattosuchia

Indeterminate remains possibly belonging to thalattosuchians have been reported from the Early Jurassic (Sinemurian) of Chile and France. However, they cannot be assigned to the group with confidence as they lack diagnostic characters. In 2023 a basal teleosauroid was reported from the earliest Jurassic (Hettangian-Sinemurian) of Morocco, representing one of the oldest known thalattosuchians. Turnersuchus from the Pliensbachian of England appears to be basal to both Teleosauroidea and Metriorhynchoidea. While abundant during the Jurassic, their fossil record during the Early Cretaceous is scarce, and generally confined to low latitudes. The latest records of the group date to the Aptian. Some members of Teleosauridae have been discovered in non-marine deposits.

== See also ==
- List of thalattosuchian-bearing stratigraphic units
- List of marine reptiles
