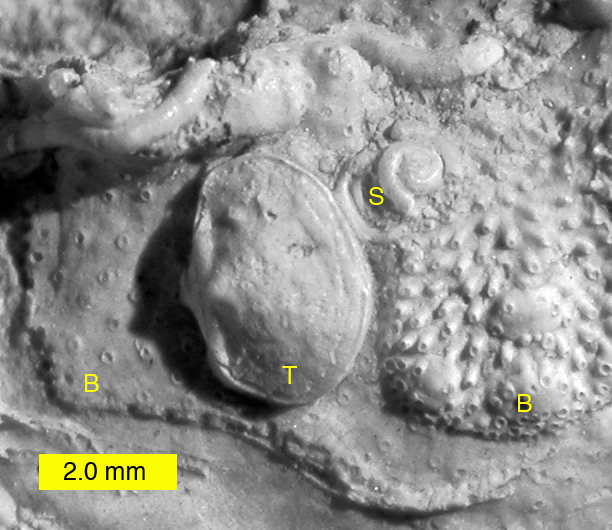
- Thecideide brachiopod (T), sabellid worm tube (S) and bryozoans (B) on the shell of the bivalve Ctenostreon from the Jurassic of Poland

Scientific classification
- Domain: Eukaryota
- Kingdom: Animalia
- Phylum: Brachiopoda
- Class: Rhynchonellata
- Order: Thecideida; Elliott, 1958

Superfamilies
- See text.

= Thecideida =

Thecideida Temporal range: Triassic–Recent

Order of brachiopods

Thecideida is an order of cryptic articulate brachiopods characterized by their small size and habit of cementing their ventral valves to hard substrates such as shells, rocks and carbonate hardgrounds. Thecideides first appeared in the Triassic and are common today.

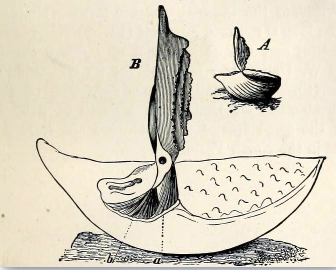
Thecidium mediterraneum, A. natural size: B. section through shell (magnified)

== Taxonomy ==
Order Thecideida

- Superfamily Thecideoidea Gray, 1840
- Superfamily Thecospiroidea Bittner, 1890
