= 2020 in archosaur paleontology =

This article records new taxa of fossil archosaurs of every kind described during the year 2020, as well as other significant discoveries and events related to paleontology of archosaurs that occurred in 2020.

== Pseudosuchians ==
=== New pseudosuchian taxa ===
| Name | Novelty | Status | Authors | Age | Type locality | Country | Notes | Images |
|---|---|---|---|---|---|---|---|---|
| Alligator hailensis | Sp. nov | Valid | Stout | Early Pleistocene | | United States (Florida) | An alligator. | |
| Andrianavoay | Gen. et comb. nov | Valid | Johnson, Young & Brusatte | Middle Jurassic (Bathonian) | | Madagascar | A machimosaurid teleosauroid. The type species is "Steneosaurus" baroni Newton (1893). | |
| Bottosaurus fustidens | Sp. nov | Valid | Cossette | Paleocene (Tiffanian) | Black Peaks | United States (Texas) | A caiman. | |
| Brochuchus parvidens | Sp. nov | Valid | Cossette et al. | Miocene | | Kenya | A member of the family Crocodylidae. | |
| Charitomenosuchus | Gen. et comb. nov | Valid | Johnson, Young & Brusatte | Middle Jurassic (Middle Callovian) | Oxford Clay | United Kingdom | A machimosaurid teleosauroid. The type species is "Steneosaurus" leedsi Andrews (1909). | |
| Clovesuurdameredeor | Gen. et comb. nov | Valid | Johnson, Young & Brusatte | Middle Jurassic (Bathonian) | Cornbrash | United Kingdom | A machimosaurid teleosauroid. The type species is "Steneosaurus" stephani Hulke (1877). | |
| Cricosaurus puelchorum | Sp. nov | Valid | Herrera, Fernández & Vennari | Early Cretaceous (Berriasian) | Vaca Muerta | Argentina | A species of Cricosaurus. Announced in 2020; the final version of the article naming it was published in 2021. | |
| Deinosuchus schwimmeri | Sp. nov | Valid | Cossette & Brochu | Late Cretaceous (Campanian) | Coffee Sand; Mooreville | United States (Alabama; Mississippi) | A species of Deinosuchus. | |
| Dorbignysuchus | Gen. et sp. nov | Valid | Jouve et al. | Paleocene | Santa Lucía | Bolivia | A dyrosaurid. The type species is D. niatu. | |
| Dynamosuchus | Gen. et sp. nov | Valid | Müller et al. | Late Triassic (Carnian) | Santa Maria | Brazil | A member of the family Ornithosuchidae. The type species is D. collisensis. | |
| Indosinosuchus kalasinensis | Sp. nov | Disputed | Johnson, Young & Brusatte | Late Jurassic (Tithonian?) | Phu Krandung | Thailand | A teleosaurid teleosauroid. Argued by Lauprasert et al. (2026) to be a junior synonym of Indosinosuchus potamosiamensis. | |
| Luciasuchus | Gen. et sp. nov | Valid | Jouve et al. | Paleocene | Santa Lucía | Bolivia | A dyrosaurid. The type species is L. lurusinqa. | |
| Melanosuchus latrubessei | Sp. nov | Valid | Souza-Filho et al. | Late Miocene | Solimões | Brazil | A relative of the black caiman. | |
| Neosteneosaurus | Gen. et comb. nov | Valid | Johnson, Young & Brusatte | Middle Jurassic (Middle Callovian) | Oxford Clay; Marnes de Dives | United Kingdom; France | A machimosaurid teleosauroid. The type species is "Steneosaurus" edwardsi Eudes-Deslongchamps (1867). | |
| Ogresuchus | Gen. et sp. nov | Valid | Sellés et al. | Late Cretaceous (early Maastrichtian) | Tremp | Spain | A sebecid crocodyliform. The type species is O. furatus. Announced in 2020; the correction including the required evidence of registration in ZooBank was published in 2021. | |
| Paludirex | Gen. et sp. et comb. nov | Valid | Ristevski et al. | Pliocene and Pleistocene | | Australia | A mekosuchine. The type species is P. vincenti; genus also includes "Pallimnarchus" gracilis Willis & Molnar (1997). | |
| Plagiophthalmosuchus | Gen. et comb. nov | Valid | Johnson, Young & Brusatte | Early Jurassic (Early Toarcian) | Dudelange; Whitby Mudstone; Alum Shale | Luxembourg; United Kingdom | A basal teleosauroid. The type species is "Steneosaurus" gracilirostris Westphal (1961). | |
| Proexochokefalos | Gen. et comb. nov | Valid | Johnson, Young & Brusatte | Middle Jurassic (Upper Callovian) | Marnes de Dives; Calcaire de Caen; Reuchenette | France; Switzerland | A machimosaurid teleosauroid. The type species is "Steneosaurus" heberti Morel de Glasville, 1876; genus also includes 'S.' cf. bouchardi Sauvage (1872). | |
| Rodeosuchus | Gen. et sp. nov | Valid | Jouve et al. | Paleocene | Santa Lucía | Bolivia | A dyrosaurid. The type species is R. machukiru. | |
| Seldsienean | Gen. et comb. nov | Valid | Johnson, Young & Brusatte | Middle Jurassic (Bathonian) | Calcaire de Caen; Great Oolite; Cornbrash; Forest Marble | France; United Kingdom | A machimosaurid teleosauroid. The type species is "Steneosaurus" megistorhynchus Saint-Hilaire (1866). | |
| Thalattosuchus | Gen. et comb. nov | Valid | Young et al. | Jurassic (Callovian/Oxfordian) | Marnes de Dives; Oxford Clay | France; United Kingdom | A metriorhynchid crocodylomorph; a new genus for "Crocodilus" superciliosus Blainville in Eudes-Deslongchamps (1852). | |

=== Pseudosuchian research ===
- A study on the skeletal anatomy and bone histology of Gracilisuchus stipanicicorum, based on data from two new specimens, is published by Lecuona, Desojo & Cerda (2020).
- Redescription of the anatomy of the postcranial skeleton of Riojasuchus tenuisceps, and a study on the phylogenetic affinities of ornithosuchids, is published by von Baczko, Desojo & Ponce (2020).
- Description of a new erpetosuchid specimen from the Upper Triassic Lossiemouth Sandstone (Scotland, United Kingdom) and a review of the anatomy, taxonomy and systematics of other erpetosuchid specimens from the Lossiemouth Sandstone (all previously referred to Erpetosuchus) is published by Foffa et al. (2020).
- Description of new fossil material of Acaenasuchus geoffreyi and a study on the phylogenetic relationships of this species is published by Marsh et al. (2020).
- A three-dimensional reconstruction of the armour plates around the tail of Stagonolepis robertsoni is presented by Keeble & Benton (2020).
- Taxonomic revision, anatomical description, and a study on the phylogenetic relationships of the type and referred materials of Prestosuchus from the original collections of Friedrich von Huene is published by Desojo, von Baczko & Rauhut (2020), who transfer the species Stagonosuchus nyassicus to the genus Prestosuchus.
- A study on the skeletal anatomy and phylogenetic relationships of Heptasuchus clarki is published by Nesbitt, Zawiskie & Dawley (2020).
- A review of the crocodylomorph Triassic record in South America is published by Leardi, Yáñez & Pol (2020), who report the occurrence of a large-bodied crocodylomorph in the Ischigualasto Formation and a putative new non-crocodyliform crocodylomorph taxon from Los Colorados Formation (Argentina).
- A study on the anatomy of the braincase of Almadasuchus figarii, and on early evolution of cranial pneumaticity in Crocodylomorpha, is published by Leardi, Pol & Clark (2020).
- A study on the impact of the habitat on the evolution of body size in Crocodyliformes, based on data from extant and fossil taxa, is published by Gearty & Payne (2020).
- New fossil material of crocodylomorphs from the Birket Qarun Formation in the Fayum Depression (Egypt), including the first record of a sebecosuchian from the late Eocene of Africa, is described by Stefanic et al. (2020).
- A study on the anatomy of the skull and on the phylogenetic relationships of Araripesuchus buitreraensis, based on data from new as well as previously reported specimens, is published by Fernandez Dumont et al. (2020).
- A study on changes in the inner ear vestibular system, involved in sensing balance and equilibrium, throughout the evolutionary history of thalattosuchians is published by Schwab et al. (2020).
- A revision of the genus Steneosaurus is published by Johnson, Young & Brusatte (2020), who designate S. rostromajor as the type species of this genus, consider S. rostromajor to be a nomen dubium and propose that the genus Steneosaurus is undiagnostic.
- Description of new fossil material of Teleidosaurus calvadosii from the middle Bathonian of Ecouché (Normandy, France) and a redescription of the anatomy of this species is published by Hua (2020).
- A study on the thermophysiology of metriorhynchids, as indicated by the oxygen isotope composition of the tooth enamel phosphate, is published by Séon et al. (2020).
- Fossil material of two large-bodied metriorhynchids is reported from lower Kimmeridgian sediments in Bavaria and Baden-Württemberg (Germany) by Abel, Sachs & Young (2020), who interpret these fossils as evidence of a new lineage of large-bodied geosaurines from the Kimmeridgian and Tithonian of Europe.
- Redescription of the holotype specimen of Enaliosuchus macrospondylus, a revision of the fossil material assigned to this species, and a review of the current knowledge of metriorhynchid diversity during the Cretaceous is published by Sachs, Young & Hornung (2020).
- A study aiming to determine whether notosuchians were warm-blooded, based on data from bone histology, is published by Cubo et al. (2020), who interpret their findings as indicating that notosuchians were likely to be ectotherms.
- A study on the diversity of notosuchians, aiming to determine which factors are potentially distorting the interpretations of the diversity of this group, is published by de Celis et al. (2020).
- A study on the anatomy and biomechanics of baurusuchid skulls, evaluating their implications for the knowledge of likely predatory behaviors of baurusuchids, is published by Montefeltro et al. (2020).
- New information on the anatomy of the endocranial cavities of Campinasuchus dinizi is presented by Fonseca et al. (2020).
- A study on the anatomy of the brain and inner ear of Baurusuchus, based on data from reconstructed endocasts, is published by Dumont et al. (2020).
- Pholidosaurid fossil material, representing the most recent record of this group reported so far, is described from the Paleocene (Danian) of Ouled Abdoun Basin (Morocco) by Jouve & Jalil (2020), who also reinterpret Dakotasuchus kingi, Woodbinesuchus byersmauricei and Sabinosuchus coahuilensis as pholidosaurids, and study the diversity of tethysuchians from the Late Jurassic to the early Paleogene.
- New specimen of Susisuchus anatoceps, displaying a non-eusuchian type palate (i.e. choana not entirely bounded by the pterygoids), is described by Montefeltro et al. (2020), who evaluate the implications of this finding for the knowledge of the anatomy of this taxon and the phylogenetic position of susisuchids.
- A study on skull anatomy and phylogenetic relationships of Bernissartia fagesii is published by Martin et al. (2020).
- Reconstruction of the internal cavities of the skull of Agaresuchus fontisensis, including the cavities that contained the brain, nerves and blood vessels, is presented by Serrano-Martínez et al. (2020).
- A study on the skeletal anatomy and phylogenetic relationships of Eocaiman cavernensis is published by Godoy et al. (2020).
- A tibia of the mylodontid sloth Pseudoprepotherium bearing 46 predation tooth marks is described from the Miocene Pebas Formation (Peru) by Pujos & Salas-Gismondi (2020), who interpret this finding as evidence of predation of a young or sub-adult Purussaurus on a mylodontid ground sloth.
- New fossil material of Mourasuchus arendsi is described from the Miocene Urumaco Formation (Venezuela) by Cidade, Rincón & Solórzano (2020), who evaluate the implications of these fossils for the knowledge of the paleobiology of this species.
- A study on the shape and biomechanical properties of the humeri of mekosuchines and extant Australian crocodiles, and on their implications for the knowledge of the locomotion of mekosuchines, is published by Stein et al. (2020).
- Redescription of the anatomy and a study on the phylogenetic relationships of Crocodylus checchiai is published by Delfino et al. (2020).
- Fossil tracks possibly produced by large crocodylomorphs moving bipedally are described from the Lower Cretaceous Jinju Formation and Haman Formation (South Korea) by Kim et al. (2020), who name a new ichnotaxon Batrachopus grandis.
- A study on the impact of recognition of cryptic species of extant crocodylians on interpretations of the crocodyliform fossil record is published by Brochu & Sumrall (2020).

== Non-avian dinosaurs ==
=== New dinosaur taxa ===
| Name | Novelty | Status | Authors | Age | Type locality | Country | Notes | Images |
|---|---|---|---|---|---|---|---|---|
| Abdarainurus | Gen. et sp. nov | Valid | Averianov & Lopatin | Late Cretaceous | Alagteeg | Mongolia | A sauropod dinosaur, probably a basal member of Titanosauria. The type species is A. barsboldi. | |
| Adratiklit | Gen. et sp. nov | Valid | Maidment et al. | Middle Jurassic (Bathonian) | El Mers II | Morocco | A member of Stegosauria. The type species is A. boulahfa. Announced in 2019; the final version of the article naming was published in 2020. | |
| Ajnabia | Gen. et sp. nov | Valid | Longrich et al. | Late Cretaceous (Maastrichtian) | Ouled Abdoun Basin | Morocco | A lambeosaurine hadrosaurid. The type species is A. odysseus. Announced in 2020; the final version of the article naming was published in 2021. | |
| Allosaurus jimmadseni | Sp. nov | Valid | Chure & Loewen | Late Jurassic (Kimmeridgian) | Morrison | United States (Colorado; Utah; Wyoming) | A species of Allosaurus. | |
| Amanzia | Gen. et comb. nov | Valid | Schwarz et al. | Late Jurassic (Kimmeridgian) | Reuchenette | Switzerland | A non-neosauropod eusauropod of uncertain phylogenetic placement. The type species is "Ornithopsis" greppini Huene (1922). | |
| Analong | Gen. et sp. nov | Valid | Ren et al. | Middle Jurassic | Chuanjie | China | A mamenchisaurid sauropod. The type species is A. chuanjieensis. | |
| Anhuilong | Gen. et sp. nov | Valid | Ren, Huang & You | Middle Jurassic | Hongqin | China | A mamenchisaurid sauropod. The type species is A. diboensis. Announced in 2018; the final version of the article naming it was published in 2020. | |
| Aratasaurus | Gen. et sp. nov | Valid | Sayão et al. | Early Cretaceous (Albian) | Romualdo | Brazil | A basal member of Coelurosauria. The type species is A. museunacionali. | |
| Bagualia | Gen. et sp. nov | Valid | Pol et al. | Early Jurassic (Toarcian) | Cañadón Asfalto | Argentina | An early member of Eusauropoda. The type species is B. alba. | |
| Beg | Gen. et sp. nov | Valid | Yu et al. | Latest Early or earliest Late Cretaceous | Ulaanoosh | Mongolia | An early member of Neoceratopsia. The type species is B. tse. | |
| Bravasaurus | Gen. et sp. nov | Valid | Hechenleitner et al. | Late Cretaceous (Campanian-Maastrichtian) | Ciénaga del Río Huaco | Argentina | A titanosaur sauropod. The type species is B. arreirosorum. | Punatitan (right) compared with Bravasaurus (left) |
| Changmiania | Gen. et sp. nov | Valid | Yang et al. | Early Cretaceous (Barremian) | Yixian | China | A basal ornithopod. The type species is C. liaoningensis. | |
| Citipes | Gen. et comb. nov | Valid | Funston | Late Cretaceous (Campanian) | Dinosaur Park | Canada (Alberta) | An oviraptorosaur theropod. The type species is "Ornithomimus" elegans Parks (1933). | |
| Dineobellator | Gen. et sp. nov | Valid | Jasinski, Sullivan & Dodson | Late Cretaceous (Maastrichtian) | Ojo Alamo | United States (New Mexico) | A dromaeosaurid theropod. The type species is D. notohesperus. | |
| Erythrovenator | Gen. et sp. nov | Valid | Müller | Late Triassic (Carnian-Norian) | Candelária | Brazil | A basal theropod. The type species is E. jacuiensis. Announced in 2020; the final version of the article naming it was published in 2021. | |
| Garrigatitan | Gen. et sp. nov | Valid | Díez Díaz et al. | Late Cretaceous (Campanian) | Grès à Reptiles | France | A titanosaur sauropod. The type species is G. meridionalis. Announced in 2020; the final version of the article naming it was published in 2021. | |
| Huinculsaurus | Gen. et sp. nov | Valid | Baiano, Coria & Cau | Late Cretaceous (late Cenomanian-Turonian) | Huincul | Argentina | A theropod related to Elaphrosaurus. The type species is H. montesi. | |
| Irisosaurus | Gen. et sp. nov | Valid | Peyre de Fabrègues et al. | Early Jurassic | Fengjiahe | China | An early member of Sauropodiformes. The type species is I. yimenensis. | |
| Jinbeisaurus | Gen. et sp. nov | Valid | Wu et al. | Late Cretaceous | Huiquanpu | China | A tyrannosauroid theropod. The type species is J. wangi. Announced in 2019; the final version of the article naming was published in 2020. | |
| Kholumolumo | Gen. et sp. nov | Valid | Fabrègues & Allain | Late Triassic | Elliot | Lesotho | An early member of Sauropodomorpha. The type species is K. ellenbergerorum. | |
| Lajasvenator | Gen. et sp. nov | Valid | Coria et al. | Early Cretaceous (Valanginian) | Mulichinco | Argentina | A carcharodontosaurid theropod. The type species is L. ascheriae. Announced in 2019; the final version of the article naming was published in 2020. | |
| Lusovenator | Gen. et sp. nov | Valid | Malafaia et al. | Late Jurassic (Kimmeridgian) | Praia da Amoreira-Porto Novo | Portugal | A carcharodontosaurian theropod. The type species is L. santosi. | |
| Narindasaurus | Gen. et sp. nov | Valid | Royo-Torres et al. | Middle Jurassic (Bathonian) | Isalo III | Madagascar | A sauropod belonging to the group Turiasauria. The type species is N. thevenini. | |
| Navajoceratops | Gen. et sp. nov | Valid | Fowler & Freedman Fowler | Late Cretaceous (Campanian) | Kirtland | United States (New Mexico) | A chasmosaurine ceratopsid. The type species is N. sullivani. | |
| Niebla | Gen. et sp. nov | Valid | Aranciaga Rolando et al. | Late Cretaceous (Maastrichtian) | Allen | Argentina | An abelisaurid theropod. The type species is N. antiqua . | |
| Oksoko | Gen. et sp. nov | Valid | Funston et al. | Late Cretaceous (Maastrichtian) | Nemegt | Mongolia | An oviraptorid theropod. The type species is O. avarsan. | |
| Omeisaurus puxiani | Sp. nov | Valid | Tan et al. | Middle Jurassic | Shaximiao | China | A species of Omeisaurus, a mamenchisaurid sauropod. Announced in 2020; the final version of the article naming was published in 2021. | |
| Overoraptor | Gen. et sp. nov | Valid | Motta et al. | Late Cretaceous (Cenomanian-Turonian) | Huincul | Argentina | A paravian theropod, possibly a relative of Rahonavis. The type species is O. chimentoi. | |
| Paraxenisaurus | Gen. et sp. nov | Valid | Serrano-Brañas et al. | Late Cretaceous | Cerro del Pueblo | Mexico | A deinocheirid ornithomimosaur theropod. The type species is P. normalensis. | |
| Punatitan | Gen. et sp. nov | Valid | Hechenleitner et al. | Late Cretaceous (Campanian-Maastrichtian) | Ciénaga del Río Huaco | Argentina | A titanosaur sauropod. The type species is P. coughlini. | Punatitan (right) compared with a Bravasaurus (left) |
| Riabininohadros | Gen. et comb. nov | Valid | Lopatin & Averianov | Late Cretaceous (Maastrichtian) | | Ukraine | An ankylopollexian iguanodont. The type species is "Orthomerus" weberi Riabinin (1945). | |
| Schleitheimia | Gen. et sp. nov | Valid | Rauhut, Holwerda & Furrer | Late Triassic (Norian) | Klettgau | Switzerland | An early member of Sauropodiformes. The type species is S. schutzi. | |
| Sinankylosaurus | Gen. et sp. nov | Valid | Wang et al. | Late Cretaceous (Campanian) | Wangshi | China | A dinosaur of unknown affinities previously identified as an ankylosaur. The type species is S. zhuchengensis. | |
| Smitanosaurus | Gen. et comb. nov | Valid | Whitlock & Wilson | Late Jurassic | Morrison | United States (Colorado) | A dicraeosaurid sauropod; a new genus for "Morosaurus" agilis Marsh (1889). | |
| Spectrovenator | Gen. et sp. nov | Valid | Zaher et al. | Early Cretaceous (Barremian-Aptian) | Quiricó | Brazil | An abelisaurid theropod. The type species is S. ragei. | |
| Stellasaurus | Gen. et sp. nov | Valid | Wilson, Ryan & Evans | Late Cretaceous (Campanian) | Two Medicine | United States (Montana) | A centrosaurine ceratopsid. The type species is S. ancellae. | |
| Terminocavus | Gen. et sp. nov | Valid | Fowler & Freedman Fowler | Late Cretaceous (Campanian) | Kirtland | United States (New Mexico) | A chasmosaurine ceratopsid. The type species is T. sealeyi. | |
| Thanatotheristes | Gen. et sp. nov | Valid | Voris et al. | Late Cretaceous (Campanian) | Foremost | Canada (Alberta) | A tyrannosaurid theropod. The type species is T. degrootorum. | |
| Thanos | Gen. et sp. nov | Valid | Delcourt & Iori | Late Cretaceous (Santonian) | São José do Rio Preto | Brazil | An abelisaurid theropod. The type species is T. simonattoi. Announced in 2018; the final version of the article naming it was published in 2020. | |
| Tralkasaurus | Gen. et sp. nov | Valid | Cerroni et al. | Late Cretaceous (Cenomanian-Turonian) | Huincul | Argentina | An abelisaurid theropod. The type species is T. cuyi. Announced in 2019; the final version of the article naming was published in 2020. | |
| Trierarchuncus | Gen. et sp. nov | Valid | Fowler et al. | Late Cretaceous (Maastrichtian) | Hell Creek | United States (Montana) | An alvarezsaurid theropod. The type species is T. prairiensis. | |
| Vallibonavenatrix | Gen. et sp. nov | Valid | Malafaia et al. | Early Cretaceous (Barremian) | Arcillas de Morella | Spain | A spinosaurid theropod. The type species is V. cani. Announced in 2019; the final version of the article naming it was published in 2020. | |
| Vectaerovenator | Gen. et sp. nov | Valid | Barker et al. | Early Cretaceous (Aptian) | Ferruginous Sands | United Kingdom | A tetanuran theropod of uncertain phylogenetic placement. The type species is V. inopinatus. | |
| Wulong | Gen. et sp. nov | Valid | Poust et al. | Early Cretaceous (Aptian) | Jiufotang | China | A microraptorine dromaeosaurid theropod. The type species is W. bohaiensis. | |
| Xunmenglong | Gen. et sp. nov | Valid | Xing et al. | Early Cretaceous | Huajiying | China | A compsognathid theropod. The type species is X. yinliangis. Announced in 2019; the final version of the article naming it was published in 2020. | |
| Yamanasaurus | Gen. et sp. nov | Valid | Apesteguía et al. | Late Cretaceous | Río Playas | Ecuador | A saltasaurine titanosaur. The type species is Y. lojaensis. Announced in 2019; the final version of the article naming it was published in 2020. | |
| Yunyangosaurus | Gen. et sp. nov | Valid | Dai et al. | Middle Jurassic | Xintiangou | China | A tetanuran theropod, possibly a member of Megalosauroidea. The type species is Y. puanensis. | |

=== General non-avian dinosaur research ===
- A study on the palynological record from the Carnian–Norian transition in the western Barents Sea region is published by Klausen, Paterson & Benton (2020), who interpret their findings as indicating that major sea-level changes across the vast delta plains situated in the northern Pangaea might have triggered terrestrial turnovers during the Carnian–Norian transition and facilitated the gradual rise of the dinosaurs to ecosystem dominance.
- A study comparing and testing for correlation between rates of morphological evolution and extinction at the species level in non-avian dinosaurs is published by Crouch (2020).
- A study on the biogeography of the Cretaceous Australian dinosaur fauna is published by Kubo (2020).
- A study assessing the accuracy and precision of two major approaches to body mass estimation in non-avian dinosaurs is published by Campione & Evans (2020).
- A study on the relationships between trabecular bone architecture and its mechanical properties in dinosaurs is published by Aguirre et al. (2020).
- A study on small dinosaur tracks from the Lower Jurassic Portland Formation (Connecticut, United States), aiming to reconstruct the foot motions of the trackmaker, is published by Falkingham, Turner & Gatesy (2020).
- A review of the Late Cretaceous dinosaur tracksites of Bolivia is published by Meyer et al. (2020), who describe new dinosaur tracksites from the Chuquisaca and Potosi departments, and report parallel trackways of subadult ankylosaurs interpreted as evidence of social behavior amongst these dinosaurs.
- A study on the evolutionary history of dinosaur integument, aiming to determine the most likely ancestral integumentary condition in dinosaurs, is published by Campione, Barrett & Evans (2020).
- A study aiming to determine dinosaur body temperatures on the basis of data from fossil eggshells, comparing them with paleoenvironmental temperatures, and evaluating their implications for the knowledge of dinosaur thermoregulation, is published by Dawson et al. (2020).
- A study on body temperatures of Late Cretaceous sauropods and theropods from western and central India, based on data from fossil eggshells, is published by Laskar et al. (2020).
- Evidence for an originally non-biomineralized, soft-shelled nature of eggs of Mussaurus and Protoceratops is presented by Norell et al. (2020), who argue that the first dinosaur egg was soft-shelled, and that the calcified, hard-shelled dinosaur egg evolved independently at least three times throughout the Mesozoic era; their interpretation of a soft Mussaurus eggshell is subsequently contested by Choi et al. (2022).
- A study on the trace elements and isotopic compositions of eggshells of dinosaur eggs from the Cretaceous Zhaoying Formation (Henan, China), evaluating their implications for reconstructions of local paleoenvironment, is published by He et al. (2020).
- A study on the affinities of putative gekkotan eggshells from the Late Cretaceous of Europe is published by Choi et al. (2020), who interpret the fossil material of Pseudogeckoolithus as theropod eggshells.
- Remains of small theropod eggs, providing new information on the diversity of small dinosaurs in the Hyogo region (Japan), are reported from the Cretaceous (Albian) of the Kamitaki Egg Quarry (Ohyamashimo Formation) by Tanaka et al. (2020), who name new ootaxa Himeoolithus murakamii (the smallest non-avian theropod egg known to date), Nipponoolithus ramosus and Subtiliolithus hyogoensis.
- Chapelle, Fernandez & Choiniere (2020) evaluate the possibility of estimating the developmental stage of dinosaur embryos, on the basis of a study of skull ossification sequences in embryos of Massospondylus carinatus and extant saurians.
- Fossil remains of a member or a relative of the genus Scelidosaurus and of an indeterminate neotheropod are described from the Lower Jurassic Lias Group (Northern Ireland) by Simms et al. (2020), representing the first non-avian dinosaur remains reported from Ireland.
- Prasad & Parmar (2020) describe fossil teeth of ornithischian and theropod dinosaurs (including five morphotypes of putative dromaeosaurid teeth) from the Middle Jurassic Kota Formation, providing new information on the Jurassic dinosaur fauna of India.
- Two sacral vertebrae representing the oldest record of fusion of these vertebrae among dinosaurs are described from the Upper Triassic Candelária Sequence (Brazil) by Moro et al. (2020), who also review the occurrence of sacral fusion in dinosaurs and their close relatives.
- A study aiming to test whether non-avian dinosaurs were in long-term decline prior to the Cretaceous–Paleogene extinction event is published by Bonsor et al. (2020); the study is subsequently criticized by Sakamoto, Benton & Venditti (2021).
- A study on the causes of extinction of non-avian dinosaurs at the end of the Cretaceous, evaluating dinosaur habitability in the wake of climatic perturbations caused by various asteroid impact and Deccan volcanism scenarios, is published by Chiarenza et al. (2020).

=== Saurischian research ===
- A study on the skeletal anatomy and phylogenetic relationships of Daemonosaurus chauliodus is published by Nesbitt & Sues (2020).
- A study on the evolutionary trends and functional relationships between giant body size and hip anatomy in saurischians is published by Tsai et al. (2020).
- A study on the metabolism of Coelophysis and Plateosaurus, aiming to determine whether the absence of large sauropodomorph dinosaurs in the tropical to subtropical latitudes during the Late Triassic (e.g. the Chinle Formation) was caused by physiological limitations, is published by Lovelace et al. (2020).
- A study on locomotion in non-avian theropods, aiming to determine the selective pressures that influenced evolution of limb length and proportions of limb components in theropods, is published by Dececchi et al. (2020).
- A study on the growth strategies of theropod dinosaurs, with a focus on gigantic tyrannosaurids and carcharodontosaurids, is published by Cullen et al. (2020).
- The discovery of sternal plates of Tawa hallae from the Late Triassic of New Mexico and Arizona, representing the oldest known dinosaur sternal plates described so far, is reported by Bradley et al. (2020), who note the presence of morphological features similar to sternal traits in avialans.
- A study on the anatomy and phylogenetic relationships of Dilophosaurus wetherilli, based on data from the holotype, referred, and previously undescribed specimens from the Kayenta Formation, is published by Marsh & Rowe (2020).
- Redescription of the anatomy, revision of the taxonomy and a study on the phylogenetic relationships of the genus Sarcosaurus is published by Ezcurra et al. (2020).
- New fossil material of theropod dinosaurs representing a wide taxonomic range is reported from the Late Jurassic of the Langenberg Quarry (Lower Saxony, Germany) by Evers & Wings (2020), who interpret these fossils as evidence of the presence of several taxa of theropods in the Late Jurassic archipelago in the area of Central Europe.
- Teeth attributed to the genus Ceratosaurus are described from the Late Jurassic Tacuarembó Formation (Uruguay) by Matías et al., (2020).
- A vertebra of an elaphrosaurine theropod is described from the Lower Cretaceous (Albian) Eumeralla Formation (Victoria, Australia) by Poropat et al. (2020), representing the first record of Elaphrosaurinae from Australia reported so far.
- New theropod fossil material is reported from the Griman Creek Formation by Brougham, Smith & Bell (2020), who interpret it as evidence of the presence of noasaurids in Australia during the Cretaceous.
- A study on the bone microstructure and growth dynamics of Vespersaurus paranaensis is published by Souza et al. (2020).
- A study on a row of large foramina on the external surface of the skull of Skorpiovenator bustingorryi is published by Cerroni et al. (2020), who report evidence indicating that these foramina were linked to an internal canal that ran across the nasal bones, which they interpret as indicative of the presence of blood vessels and nerves, and attempt to determine possible biological significance of this neurovascular system.
- A study on the anatomy of the skull of Carnotaurus sastrei is published by Cerroni, Canale & Novas (2020).
- Almost complete skeleton of Majungasaurus crenatissimus preserving evidence of multiple pre-mortem pathologies is described from the Upper Cretaceous Maevarano Formation (Madagascar) by Gutherz et al. (2020), who interpret these pathologies as most likely to be the result of multiple non-fatal events experienced during the life of the individual, rather than a single traumatic incident.
- Hornung (2020) interprets the holotype specimen of "Ornithocheirus" hilsensis as a partial phalanx of a large-sized theropod, making it one of the earliest dinosaur discoveries in Germany and one of the few records of large-sized theropods near the Valanginian/Hauterivian boundary of Central Europe.
- Pereira et al. (2020) describe theropod fossil material from the Albian-Cenomanian Açu Formation (Brazil), and evaluate the diversity of theropods from this formation.
- Fragmentary maxilla of a member of the genus Torvosaurus is described from the Middle Jurassic (Callovian) Ornatenton Formation (Germany) by Rauhut et al. (2020), representing the first occurrence of this genus from Germany and the oldest record of Torvosaurus reported so far.
- A study on the formation time and replacement rates of spinosaurid teeth from the Kem Kem Group (Morocco), comparing them to those of other archosaurs and evaluating their palaeoecological implications, is published by Heckeberg & Rauhut (2020).
- A study on the anatomy of the braincase of Irritator challengeri, and on its implications for the knowledge of the neuroanatomy and ecology of this dinosaur, is published by Schade, Rauhut & Evers (2020).
- A study on the anatomy of the tail of Spinosaurus aegyptiacus is published by Ibrahim et al. (2020), who present evidence of tall neural spines and elongate chevrons forming a large, flexible fin-like organ, interpreted by the authors as evidence of adaptation to tail-propelled aquatic locomotion.
- A study on the taxonomic status of spinosaurs from the Kem Kem Group (Morocco) is published by Smyth, Ibrahim & Martill (2020), who consider Oxalaia quilombensis, Spinosaurus maroccanus, and Sigilmassasaurus brevicollis to be junior synonyms of Spinosaurus aegyptiacus.
- Beevor et al. (2020) report a new locality near Tarda on the northern margin of the Tafilalt (Morocco) dominated by dental remains of Spinosaurus, and interpret the high abundance of spinosaur teeth compared to remains of terrestrial dinosaurs as evidence supporting the interpretation of Spinosaurus as an aquatic animal.
- A study on the anatomy of teeth of Sinraptor dongi, comparing it with dentition of other theropods and evaluating its implications for the knowledge of the feeding ecology of S. dongi, is published by Hendrickx et al. (2020).
- A study on theropod bite marks on Late Jurassic vertebrate fossils from the Mygatt-Moore Quarry (Colorado, United States), the identification of the trace makers and their feeding ecology is published by Drumheller et al. (2020), who report possible evidence of cannibalism in Allosaurus.
- A revision of putative carcharodontosaurid teeth from the Upper Cretaceous Bauru Group (Brazil) is published by Delcourt et al. (2020), who interpret the studied fossil material as more likely to belong to abelisaurid theropods.
- A study on an indeterminate megaraptoran specimen from the Winton Formation (Australia) is published by White et al. (2020), who interpret this finding as evidence of either ontogenetic or intraspecific variation in Australovenator, or the presence of a second megaraptorid taxon in the Winton Formation.
- Two partial skeletons of large-bodied megaraptorid theropods, representing the most ancient unquestionable records of Megaraptoridae from South America reported so far, are described from the Upper Cretaceous (Cenomanian–Turonian) Bajo Barreal Formation (Argentina) by Lamanna et al. (2020).
- A study on the pneumaticity of the sacrum and tail of Aoniraptor libertatem, and on its implications for the knowledge of the evolution of pneumaticity through Theropoda, is published by Rolando, Marsà & Novas (2020).
- Pol & Goloboff (2020) present a protocol that identifies unstable taxa that decrease support measures in the phylogenetic analyses, and explore a dataset of coelurosaurian relationships published by Pei et al. (2020) using this protocol.
- A study on the biogeography of coelurosaurian theropods is published by Ding et al. (2020).
- A study on the endocranial anatomy of Bistahieversor sealeyi, evaluating its implications for the knowledge of the evolution of the brains and sinuses of tyrannosauroids, is published by McKeown et al. (2020).
- A metatarsal bone of a young tyrannosaurid theropod, assigned to a very small juvenile Gorgosaurus is described from the Campanian Dinosaur Park Formation (Alberta, Canada) by Yun (2020).
- A frontal bone of a subadult Daspletosaurus torosus is described from the Campanian Dinosaur Park Formation (Alberta, Canada) by Yun (2020).
- A study on the proposed autapomorphies of Dynamoterror dynastes is published by Yun (2020), who determined a taxonomic name to be a nomen dubium.
- A study on the bone microstructure of two half-grown specimens of Tyrannosaurus rex, evaluating its implications for the knowledge of the early life history of members of this species and the taxonomic validity of Nanotyrannus lancensis, is published by Woodward et al. (2020).
- A study on changes in skeleton of Tyrannosaurus rex during its growth, aiming to assign known specimens of this taxon to specific growth categories, is published by Carr (2020).
- A study on the pathologies observed in the caudal vertebrae and left fibula of the Tyrannosaurus rex specimen FMNH PR2081 ("Sue") is published by Hamm et al. (2020), who diagnose this specimen as affected by osteomyelitis.
- A study on the anatomy of the integumentary structures of Juravenator starki and Sciurumimus albersdoerferi from the Kimmeridgian Torleite Formation of southern Germany is published by Foth et al. (2020).
- A unique scale type with distinctive circular nodes, interpreted as integumentary sense organs analogous to those in modern crocodylians, is reported from the tail of Juravenator starki by Bell & Hendrickx (2020).
- A study on diversity and possible functions of the epidermal covering of Juravenator starki is published online by Bell & Hendrickx (2020).
- A compsognathid specimen preserved with elaborate integumentary structures was described from the Lower Cretaceous Crato Formation (Brazil); the announcement of its discovery sparked a legal and ethical controversy regarding the circumstances of the fossil's export from Brazil, and the publication describing the specimen was subsequently withdrawn.
- A study on the pneumatic chambers in the vertebrae of Nothronychus mckinleyi is published by Smith, Sanders & Wolfe (2020).
- A review of the research on the phylogenetic relationships, morphology and locomotory (including aerial) capabilities of scansoriopterygids, and on their implications for the knowledge of the origin of oviraptorosaurs, is published by Sorkin (2020).
- Partial skeleton of an oviraptorosaur theropod closely associated with two eggs (one within the pelvic canal and the other just posterior to it) is described from the Upper Cretaceous Nanxiong Formation (China) by Jin et al. (2020), who note the complete absence of medullary bone in this egg-bearing specimen.
- New fossil material of Chirostenotes pergracilis, representing the first associated mandibular and postcranial material of a caenagnathid from the Dinosaur Park Formation (Alberta, Canada), is described by Funston & Currie (2020), who evaluate the implications of these fossils for the knowledge of taxonomy and diversity of caenagnathids from the Dinosaur Park Formation and the growth patterns of Chirostenotes pergracilis.
- Description of new caenagnathid fossil material from the Dinosaur Park Formation (Alberta, Canada), providing new information on pelvic anatomy of caenagnathids, is published by Rhodes, Funston & Currie (2020).
- Description of a partial skeleton of a caenagnathid theropod from the Upper Cretaceous Hell Creek Formation (Montana, United States) and study on the bone histology of this specimen is published by Cullen et al. (2020), who evaluate the implications of their findings for the knowledge of the utility of size as a determinant for referral of incomplete or fragmentary skeletal remains to specific or new coelurosaur taxa.
- An adult oviraptorid specimen preserved atop an egg clutch that contains embryonic remains, representing the first such finding among non-avialan dinosaurs, is described by Bi et al. (2020).
- The first probable deinonychosaur (likely troodontid) tracks from Canada are described from the Campanian Wapiti Formation (Alberta) by Enriquez et al. (2020).
- New theropod teeth, possibly belonging to members of the family Dromaeosauridae and representing the first record of that group from the southern Junggar Basin, are reported from the Upper Jurassic Qigu Formation (China) by Maisch & Matzke (2020).
- A study on the facial pneumatic features of members of the family Dromaeosauridae, and on the evolutionary history of these features, is published by Brownstein (2020).
- A study on the differences in the locomotor and predatory specializations of eudromaeosaurs and unenlagiines, as indicated by the anatomy of their hindlimbs, is published by Gianechini, Ercoli & Díaz-Martínez (2020).
- A study on eudromaeosaurian maxillae, aiming to determine the extent to which maxillae can be used to draw ecological and phylogenetic inferences about dromaeosaurids, is published by Powers, Sullivan & Currie (2020).
- Evidence of sequential wing feather molt in a specimen of Microraptor is presented by Kiat et al. (2020), who evaluate the implications of this finding for the knowledge of the ecology and locomotion of this theropod.
- Partial dentary of a juvenile saurornitholestine dromaeosaurid is described from the Upper Cretaceous Prince Creek Formation (Alaska, United States) by Chiarenza et al. (2020), representing the first confirmed non-dental fossil specimen of a member of Dromaeosauridae in the Arctic.
- The first cranial material of Saurornitholestes is described from the Judith River Formation (Montana, United States) by Wilson & Fowler (2020), representing the easternmost occurrence of this genus reported so far.
- A study testing for dietary changes through growth in Deinonychus antirrhopus is published by Frederickson, Engel & Cifelli (2020).
- A study on the anatomy of the hindbrain and inner ear of Velociraptor mongoliensis, evaluating its implications for the knowledge of the trophic ecology and sensory aptitude of this theropod, is published by King et al. (2020).
- A study aiming to determine the thermoregulatory efficiency of contact incubation of partially buried eggs by Troodon formosus is published by Hogan & Varricchio (2020).
- Description of the anatomy of the skeleton of Rahonavis ostromi is published by Forster et al. (2020).
- A study on the flight potential and gliding capabilities of Yi qi and Ambopteryx longibrachium is published by Dececchi et al. (2020).
- A study on the chemical preservation of fossil feathers preserved in association with the skeleton of Anchiornis huxleyi is published by Cincotta et al. (2020).
- A study on the quality of the sauropodomorph fossil record is published by Cashmore et al. (2020).
- A study on the anatomy of the endocranial cavity and the probable anatomy of the brain of Buriolestes schultzi is published by Müller et al. (2020).
- Description of new fossil material of Thecodontosaurus antiquus, providing new information on the skeletal anatomy of this species, is published by Ballell, Rayfield & Benton (2020), who evaluate the implications of these fossils for the knowledge of the paleoecology of Thecodontosaurus and the taxonomy of Late Triassic British sauropodomorphs.
- A study on the anatomy of the braincase of Thecodontosaurus antiquus is published by Ballell et al. (2020), who also reconstruct the anatomy of the brain of this dinosaur, and evaluate its implications for the knowledge of the paleobiology of Thecodontosaurus.
- Greenfield et al. (2020) reviewed the nomenclature of Coloradisaurus and determined that the authorship should be attributed to Peter Galton and not David Lambert.
- A study on the morphological variation of Plateosaurus occurring at the genus level, as indicated by data on the shape variation of a sample of limb long bones, is published by Lefebvre et al. (2020).
- New skeleton of Plateosaurus, representing the first substantially complete specimen of a juvenile Plateosaurus and the first such specimen with a body size significantly below the known adult size range of this taxon, is described from the Norian Klettgau Formation (Switzerland) by Nau et al. (2020).
- The second-known specimen of Ignavusaurus rachelis, extending known geographic range of this species, is described from the Likhoele Mountain near Mafeteng (Upper Elliot Formation, Lesotho) by Bodenham & Barrett (2020).
- A study on teeth development in embryos of Lufengosaurus is published by Reisz et al. (2020).
- A study on the histology of the humeri of two basal sauropod specimens from the Jurassic of Niger and Thailand, reporting evidence of a layer of the radial fibrolamellar bone buried in the outer cortex of these bones, is published by Jentgen-Ceschino, Stein & Fischer (2020), who interpret their findings as evidence of these sauropods being affected by pathologies similar to Ewing's sarcoma and avian osteopetrosis or haemangioma.
- A study comparing articulation and range of motion of necks of extant giraffes and Spinophorosaurus nigerensis is published by Vidal et al. (2020).
- A study on the body plan, functional morphology of the neck and feeding capabilities of Spinophorosaurus nigerensis is published by Vidal et al. (2020).
- A study on the skeletal anatomy and phylogenetic relationships of Klamelisaurus gobiensis is published by Moore et al. (2020).
- Two vertebrae of diplodocoid sauropods are described from the Middle Jurassic (Callovian) Podosinki Formation (Russia) by Averianov & Zverkov (2020), who evaluate the implications of this finding for the knowledge of the initial radiation of Diplodocoidea.
- Fossils of a member of Flagellicaudata are described from the Middle Jurassic Otlaltepec Formation (Mexico) by Rivera-Sylva & Espinosa-Arrubarrena (2020), representing the first conclusive evidence of the occurrence of Flagellicaudata in this part of North America throughout the Bathonian-Callovian.
- Baron (2020) argues that the elongate tails of diplodocid sauropods were used for herding co-ordination.
- A review of the distribution of the Cretaceous fossils of rebbachisaurid sauropods is published by Pereira et al. (2020), who report the first occurrence of a rebbachisaurid from the Açu Formation (Potiguar Basin, Brazil), and discuss its paleobiogeographic implications.
- A reconstruction of the epaxial and hypaxial musculature of the tail of Giraffatitan brancai is published by Díez Díaz et al. (2020).
- A humerus of a titanosauriform sauropod, likely belonging to a member or a relative of the genus Duriatitan, is described from the Tithonian-Berriasian Rupelo Formation (Burgos, Spain) by Torcida Fernández-Baldor, Canudo & Huerta (2020).
- A large sauropod humerus, probably belonging to a member of the species Fusuisaurus zhaoi, is described from the Lower Cretaceous Xinlong Formation (Guangxi, China) by Mo et al. (2020).
- A study on sauropod teeth from the Cenomanian Griman Creek Formation (Australia), evaluating their implications for the knowledge of the diversity and palaeoecology of the sauropods from this formation, is published by Frauenfelder et al. (2020), who report evidence of the presence of at least two taxa of non-titanosaur titanosauriforms and a possible titanosaur.
- A study on histology and affinities of two bone fragments from the Upper Cretaceous (lower Santonian to/or lower Campanian) of the Western Srednogorie (Bulgaria) is published by Nikolov et al. (2020), who interpret these fossils as bones of a titanosaur sauropod, coming from a time interval when sauropods are rare in the fossil record of Europe.
- An almost intact embryonic skull of a titanosaur sauropod is described from the Upper Cretaceous Allen Formation (Argentina) by Kundrát et al. (2020), who interpret this specimen as indicating that titanosaurs hatched with a temporary monocerotid (single-horned) face, retracted narial openings, and early binocular vision.
- Evidence of aggressive case of osteomyelitis affecting a titanosaur specimen from the Upper Cretaceous Adamantina Formation (Brazil) is reported by Aureliano et al. (2020), who also report the preservation of tens of parasites throughout the specimen's vascular canals.
- Description of the skeletal anatomy of Savannasaurus elliottorum is published by Poropat et al. (2020).
- A study on the anatomy of the brain and inner ear of Narambuenatitan palomoi is published by Paulina-Carabajal, Filippi & Knoll (2020).
- Voegele et al. (2020) reconstruct the forelimb and shoulder girdle musculature of Dreadnoughtus schrani, as well as the pelvic girdle and hindlimb musculature of this sauropod.
- A study on the anatomy of the appendicular skeleton of Patagotitan mayorum is published by Otero, Carballido & Moreno (2020), who also provide a new body mass estimate of this species.

=== Ornithischian research ===
- A study on the phylogenetic relationships of the silesaurids is published by Müller & Garcia (2020), who recover silesaurids as an evolutionary grade of early ornithischian dinosaurs.
- A study on the microstructure of the tooth enamel of Manidens condorensis, evaluating its implications for the knowledge of the evolution of tooth enamel in Ornithischia, is published by Becerra & Pol (2020).
- A study on tooth replacement in Manidens condorensis is published by Becerra et al. (2020).
- New specimens of Scutellosaurus lawleri, providing new information on the anatomy of this species, are described from the Lower Jurassic Kayenta Formation (Arizona, United States), by Breeden & Rowe (2020).
- Studies on the structure and development of the dermal skeleton of Scelidosaurus harrisonii, the neurocranium and the associated principal sensory systems of this dinosaur, its locomotor abilities, breathing, and on its phylogenetic relationships, are published by Norman (2020).
- Description of the dermal armor of Stegosaurus, revision of the various reconstructions of the dermal armor of S. ungulatus and S. stenops, and a summary of the evidence for and against the different functions proposed for the plates and spines of Stegosaurus is published by Galton (2020).
- An isolated caudal vertebra representing the first evidence of the presence of an ankylosaur in the Upper Jurassic Qigu Formation (China) is described by Augustin et al. (2020).
- A study aiming to determine the social lifestyle of ankylosaurs, as indicated by anatomy, taphonomic history, ontogenetic composition of the mass death assemblages and inferred habitat characteristics, is published by Botfalvai, Prondvai & Ősi (2020).
- Redescription of the anatomy of the holotype specimens of Hylaeosaurus armatus and Polacanthus foxii, and a study on the taxonomy of all ankylosaur specimens from the British Wealden Supergroup, is published by Raven et al. (2020).
- Fossil stomach contents preserved within the abdominal cavity of the holotype specimen of Borealopelta markmitchelli are described by Brown et al. (2020).
- Description of the anatomy of braincases of three specimens of Bissektipelta archibaldi is published by Kuzmin et al. (2020).
- A study on the phylogenetic relationships of cerapodan ornithischians is published by Dieudonné et al. (2020).
- A study on the bone histology and probable life history of Jeholosaurus shangyuanensis is published by Han et al. (2020).
- A study on the bone histology and growth patterns of Trinisaura santamartaensis and Morrosaurus antarcticus is published by Garcia-Marsà et al. (2020).
- Redescription of Eucercosaurus tanyspondylus and Syngonosaurus macrocercus from the Cenomanian Cambridge Greensand (United Kingdom) is published by Barrett & Bonsor (2020), who interpret both these taxa as described on the basis of fossils of iguanodontian dinosaurs possessing no clear diagnostic features.
- A study on the bone microstructure of Mongolian hadrosauroid dinosaurs, evaluating its implications for the knowledge of growth strategies and evolution of gigantism in hadrosauroids, is published by Słowiak et al. (2020).
- Brownstein (2020) describes new fossil material of hadrosauromorphs from the Maastrichtian New Egypt Formation (New Jersey, United States), including a skeleton of a specimen which was probably a small-bodied adult hadrosauromorph from a lineage outside Hadrosauridae and fossils of juvenile hadrosauromorphs.
- A study on the anatomy of the tail of Tethyshadros insularis is published by Dalla Vecchia (2020).
- A study on pathologies affecting two hadrosaurid vertebrae from the Dinosaur Provincial Park (Alberta, Canada) is published by Rothschild et al. (2020), who consider Langerhans cell histiocytosis to be the most likely diagnosis, making it the first case of LCH recognized in a dinosaur so far.
- A study on a set of fused hadrosaur vertebrae with fragments of a tooth of Tyrannosaurus rex scattered through the intervertebral space is published by Rothschild et al. (2020), who interpret this findings as evidence indicating that the space between the vertebrae was not occupied by intervertebral discs, but rather by an articular space similar to that in modern reptiles.
- A study on the migratory behaviours of hadrosaurs, as indicated by strontium isotope data from hadrosaur teeth from the Late Cretaceous of Alberta (Canada), is published by Terrill, Henderson & Anderson (2020).
- A study aiming to determine whether body size and ontogenetic age were strongly correlated in hadrosaurid dinosaurs from the Dinosaur Park Formation (Alberta, Canada), and to test the hypothesis of a rapid growth rate of hadrosaurids from the Dinosaur Park Formation relative to those from the Two Medicine Formation, is published by Wosik et al. (2020).
- Partial forelimb of a large hadrosaurid with similarities to forelimbs of lambeosaurines is described from the Maastrichtian New Egypt Formation (New Jersey, United States) by Brownstein & Bissell (2020), who interpret this findings as evidence of the presence of a morphotype of large hadrosauromorph with elongate forelimbs in the latest Maastrichtian of eastern North America.
- A study on the anatomy of fossils of Ugrunaaluk kuukpikensis and on the taxonomic status of this species is published by Takasaki et al. (2020), who consider Ugrunaaluk to be a junior synonym of the genus Edmontosaurus.
- Evidence of pre-mortem traumatic injuries in multiple skeletal elements (especially in tail vertebrae) of Edmontosaurus annectens from the Lance Formation (Wyoming, United States) is presented by Siviero et al. (2020).
- A study on the taphonomy and depositional history of an extensive Maastrichtian bonebed in the Lance Formation of eastern Wyoming dominated by fossils of Edmontosaurus annectens is published by Snyder et al. (2020).
- A study on the interior structure of the nasal spine of Tsintaosaurus spinorhinus is published by Zhang et al. (2020).
- Description of new fossil material of Pararhabdodon isonensis, and a study on the bone histology and life history of this taxon, is published by Serrano et al. (2020).
- A study on the morphology and likely causes of the injuries in the holotype specimen of Parasaurolophus walkeri is published by Bertozzo et al. (2020).
- Evidence of preservation of proteins, chromosomes and chemical markers of DNA in the cartilage of a nestling of Hypacrosaurus stebingeri from the Campanian Two Medicine Formation (Montana, United States) is presented by Bailleul et al. (2020).
- A study on patterns of morphological variation of the ceratopsian frill, and on its implications for the knowledge of the ontogeny and evolution of this structure, is published by Prieto-Márquez et al. (2020).
- New protoceratopsid specimens are described from the Üüden Sair and Zamyn Khond localities (Mongolia) by Czepiński (2020), who evaluates the implications of these specimens for correlation of fossil sites of the Djadochta Formation, and interprets one of these specimens as probable evidence of an anagenetic transition from Protoceratops andrewsi to Bagaceratops rozhdestvenskyi.
- Evidence of osteosarcoma affecting a specimen of Centrosaurus apertus, representing the first case of osteosarcoma in a dinosaur reported so far, is presented by Ekhtiari et al. (2020).
- Description of an immature specimen of Styracosaurus albertensis (the smallest known for this species) from the Campanian Dinosaur Park Formation (Alberta, Canada), and a study comparing the ontogeny and individual variation of the skulls in Styracosaurus and Centrosaurus, is published by Brown, Holmes & Currie (2020).
- A study on the braincases of two specimens of Triceratops is published by Sakagami & Kawabe (2020), who present three-dimensional virtual renderings of the endocasts of the cranial cavities and bony labyrinths, and compare the endocranial endocasts of specimens of Triceratops and other ceratopsians.

== Birds ==
=== New bird taxa ===
| Name | Novelty | Status | Authors | Age | Type locality | Country | Notes | Images |
|---|---|---|---|---|---|---|---|---|
| Abitusavis | Gen. et sp. nov | Valid | Wang et al. | Early Cretaceous | | China | A relative of Yanornis. The type species is A. lii. | |
| Aldiomedes | Gen. et sp. nov | Valid | Mayr & Tennyson | Late Pliocene | Tangahoe | New Zealand | An albatross. The type species is A. angustirostris. Announced in 2019; the final version of the article naming it was published in 2020. | |
| Antarcticavis | Gen. et sp. nov | Valid | Cordes-Person et al. | Late Cretaceous (Maastrichtian) | Snow Hill Island | Antarctica | A bird of uncertain phylogenetic placement, possibly a member of Ornithuromorpha belonging to the group Ornithurae. The type species is A. capelambensis. Announced in 2019; the final version of the article naming was published in 2020. | |
| Asio ecuadoriensis | Sp. nov | Valid | Lo Coco, Agnolín & Carrión | Late Pleistocene | | Ecuador | An owl, a species of Asio. | |
| Asteriornis | Gen. et sp. nov | Valid | Field et al. | Late Cretaceous (Maastrichtian) | Maastricht | Belgium | An early member of Neornithes, occupying a position close to the last common ancestor of Galloanserae. The type species is A. maastrichtensis. | |
| Aviraptor | Gen. et sp. nov | Valid | Mayr & Hurum | Oligocene (Rupelian) | | Poland | A member of the family Accipitridae. The type species is A. longicrus. | |
| Buteo sanfelipensis | Sp. nov | Valid | Suárez | Quaternary | Las Breas de San Felipe tar seeps | Cuba | A species of Buteo. | |
| Buteogallus royi | Sp. nov | Valid | Suárez | Quaternary | Las Breas de San Felipe tar seeps | Cuba | A species of Buteogallus. | |
| Cathartes emsliei | Sp. nov | Valid | Suárez & Olson | Late Pleistocene to Holocene | | Cuba | A species of Cathartes. | |
| Chauvireria bulgarica | Sp. nov | Valid | Boev | Early Pleistocene | | Bulgaria | A species of Chauvireria, a member of the family Phasianidae. | |
| Coragyps seductus | Sp. nov | Valid | Suárez | Quaternary | Las Breas de San Felipe tar seeps | Cuba | A New World vulture. | |
| Corvus bragai | Sp. nov | Valid | Pavia | Plio-Pleistocene transition | Kromdraai fossil site | South Africa | A species of Corvus. | |
| Cousteauvia | Gen. et sp. nov | Valid | Zelenkov | Eocene (Priabonian) | | Kazakhstan | A member of Anseriformes of uncertain phylogenetic placement. The type species is C. kustovia. | |
| ?Crossvallia waiparensis | Sp. nov | Valid | Mayr et al. | Paleocene | Waipara | New Zealand | A large-sized penguin. Announced in 2019; the final version of the article naming it was published in 2020. | |
| Dobrosturnus | Gen. et sp. nov | Valid | Boev | Middle Miocene | | Bulgaria | A starling. The type species is D. kardamensis. | |
| Empeirodytes | Gen. et sp. nov | Valid | Ohashi & Hasegawa | Oligocene | Ashiya Group | Japan | A member of the family Plotopteridae. The type species is E. okazakii. | |
| Eudyptes atatu | Sp. nov | Valid | Thomas, Tennyson, Scofield & Ksepka in Thomas et al. | Pliocene (Piacenzian) | Tangahoe | New Zealand | A crested penguin. | |
| Falcatakely | Gen. et sp. nov | Valid | O'Connor et al. | Late Cretaceous (Maastrichtian) | Maevarano | Madagascar | A member of Enantiornithes. The type species is F. forsterae. | |
| Fulica montanei | Sp. nov | Valid | Alarcón-Muñoz, Labarca & Soto-Acuña | Late Pleistocene-early Holocene | Laguna de Tagua Tagua | Chile | A coot. | |
| Gastornis laurenti | Sp. nov | Valid | Mourer-Chauviré & Bourdon | Early Eocene | | France | A species of Gastornis. | |
| Gigantohierax itchei | Sp. nov | Valid | Suárez | Quaternary | Las Breas de San Felipe tar seeps | Cuba | A member of the family Accipitridae | |
| Glaucidium ireneae | Sp. nov | Valid | Pavia | Plio-Pleistocene transition | Kromdraai fossil site | South Africa | A pygmy owl. | |
| Icterus turmalis | Sp. nov | Valid | Steadman & Oswald | Late Pleistocene | Talara tar seeps | Peru | A New World oriole. | |
| Jacamatia | Gen. et sp. nov | Valid | Duhamel et al. | Early Oligocene | | France | A member of the stem group of Galbulae. The type species is J. luberonensis. | |
| Khinganornis | Gen. et sp. nov | Valid | Wang et al. | Early Cretaceous (Aptian) | Longjiang | China | A derived member of Ornithuromorpha. The type species is K. hulunbuirensis. | |
| Kompsornis | Gen. et sp. nov | Valid | Wang et al. | Early Cretaceous | Jiufotang | China | A member of Jeholornithiformes. The type species is K. longicaudus. | |
| Linxiavis | Gen. et sp. nov | Valid | Li et al. | Late Miocene | Liushu | China | A sandgrouse. The type species is L. inaquosus. | |
| Milvago diazfrancoi | Sp. nov | Valid | Suárez | Quaternary | Las Breas de San Felipe tar seeps | Cuba | A species of Milvago. | |
| Mirusavis | Gen. et sp. nov | Valid | Wang et al. | Early Cretaceous | Yixian | China | A member of Enantiornithes. The type species is M. parvus. Announced in 2019; the final version of the article naming it was published in 2020. | |
| Molothrus resinosus | Sp. nov | Valid | Steadman & Oswald | Late Pleistocene | Talara tar seeps | Peru | A cowbird. | |
| Nahmavis | Gen. et sp. nov | Valid | Musser & Clarke | Early Eocene | Green River | United States | A member of Neoaves of uncertain phylogenetic placement, possibly a charadriiform or a stem-gruiform. The type species is N. grandei. | |
| Ornimegalonyx ewingi | Sp. nov | Valid | Suárez | Quaternary | | Cuba | A giant owl. | |
| ?Palaeoplancus dammanni | Sp. nov | Valid | Mayr & Perner | Eocene (Chadronian) | White River Group | United States (Wyoming) | Probably a stem group representative of the family Accipitridae. | |
| Phasianus bulgaricus | Sp. nov | Valid | Boev | Miocene (Turolian) | | Bulgaria | A species of Phasianus. | |
| Primoptynx | Gen. et sp. nov | Valid | Mayr, Gingerich & Smith | Eocene (Wasatchian) | Willwood | United States (Wyoming) | A large-sized owl. The type species is P. poliotauros. | |
| Prosobonia sauli | Sp. nov | Valid | De Pietri et al. | Holocene | | Pitcairn Islands | A Polynesian sandpiper. | |
| Similiyanornis | Gen. et sp. nov | Valid | Wang et al. | Early Cretaceous | | China | A relative of Yanornis. The type species is S. brevipectus. | |
| Stenornis | Gen. et sp. nov | Valid | Ohashi & Hasegawa | Oligocene | Ashiya Group | Japan | A member of the family Plotopteridae. The type species is S. kanmonensis. | |
| Tongoenas | Gen. et sp. nov | Valid | Steadman & Takano | Pleistocene and Holocene | | Tonga | A pigeon. The type species is T. burleyi. | |
| Tyto maniola | Sp. nov | Valid | Suárez & Olson | Pleistocene | | Cuba | A species of Tyto. | |
| Vinchinavis | Gen. et sp. nov | Valid | Tambussi et al. | Miocene | Toro Negro | Argentina | A large eagle. The type species is V. paka. Announced in 2020; the final version of the article naming it was published in 2021. | |
| Vorombe | Gen. et comb. nov | Disputed | Hansford & Turvey | Holocene | | Madagascar | An elephant bird. The type species is "Aepyornis" titan Andrews (1894). Announced in 2018; the correction including the required ZooBank accession number was published in 2020. Tentatively synonymised with Aepyornis maximus by Grealy et al. (2023). | |
| Wilaru prideauxi | Sp. nov. | Valid | De Pietri et al. | Early Miocene | Etadunna; Wipajiri | Australia | A species of Wilaru. Announced in 2016; the correction including the required ZooBank accession number was published in 2020. | |

=== Avian research ===
- A study on the phylogenetic relationships and powered flight potential of early birds and their closest relatives is published by Pei et al. (2020), who argue that the potential for powered flight evolved at least three times (once in birds and twice in dromaeosaurids).
- A study aiming to determine whether the origin of birds was marked with a distinct shift in cranial evolutionary dynamics, based on data from birds and non-avian dinosaurs, is published by Felice et al. (2020).
- A study on patterns of evolution of avian brain size and its relationship with body size evolution, based on data from extant and fossil birds and from non-avian theropod dinosaurs, is published by Ksepka et al. (2020).
- A study aiming to determine the volumes of the brain structures used to infer behavior or functional capabilities in Archaeopteryx lithographica, Lithornis plebius, Dinornis robustus, Paraptenodytes antarcticus, Psilopterus lemoinei, Llallawavis scagliai and an unnamed Miocene galliform is published by Early, Ridgely & Witmer (2020).
- The study on the identity of the holotype feather of Archaeopteryx lithographica published by Kaye et al. (2019) is criticized by Carney, Tischlinger & Shawkey (2020).
- Evidence of feather moulting in the Thermopolis specimen of Archaeopteryx is presented by Kaye, Pittman & Wahl (2020), who evaluate the implications of this finding for the knowledge of the origins of flight-related molting and flight; the study is subsequently criticized by Kiat et al. (2021).
- A study on the structure and possible function of the paddle-shaped skeletal elements preserved in the thoracic region of the skeleton of Jeholornis is published by Zheng et al. (2020), who interpret these elements as anomalously expanded sternal ribs.
- Traces of the soft tissue of the beak preserved with two specimens of Confuciusornis are described by Zheng et al. (2020).
- Miller et al. (2020) describe a new specimen of Confuciusornis sanctus preserving a disassociated rhamphotheca, and evaluate the differences in the keratinous and bony beak anatomy between confuciusornithids and modern birds.
- A study on the furcula-coracoid articulation in Confuciusornis and in extant birds that utilize different flight styles is published by Wu et al. (2020), who report the first evidence of fossilized secondary cartilage on the furcula of a fossil bird, and evaluate the implications of their findings for the knowledge of flight styles in Mesozoic birds.
- A study on the anatomy of the skull of Sapeornis chaoyangensis is published by Hu et al. (2020).
- New specimen of Longusunguis kurochkini, providing new information on the anatomy of this taxon and indicating that the plesiomorphic diapsid skull was retained by at least some basal enantiornithines, is described from the Lower Cretaceous Jiufotang Formation (China) by Hu et al. (2020).
- An isolated foot of an enantiornithine consisting of complete metatarsals and digits, including the claws, is described from the Cretaceous Burmese amber by Xing et al. (2020).
- New enantiornithine specimen preserving portions of two forelimbs and two feet, as well as associated feathers, is described from the Cretaceous Burmese amber by Xing et al. (2020), providing new evidence of a diversity of limb proportions and plumage patterns in the enantiornithine fauna from Myanmar.
- Bailleul et al. (2020) confirm the presence of ovarian follicles in an enantiornithine specimen STM10–12 from the Lower Cretaceous of China; the conclusions of this study are subsequently contested by Mayr et al. (2020), who interpret putative ovarian follicles of this specimen and other birds from the Jehol Biota as more likely to be ingested food items.
- New specimen of Protopteryx fengningensis, providing additional information on the plumage of this species, is described by O'Connor et al. (2020).
- Wang & Zhou (2020) describe a new specimen of Piscivorenantiornis inusitatus from the Lower Cretaceous Jiufotang Formation (China), providing new information on the anatomy and phylogenetic relationships of this taxon.
- A feather fragment from an aquatic bird is reported from amber recovered from the Pipestone Creek bonebed from the Campanian Wapiti Formation (Alberta, Canada) by Cockx et al. (2020).
- A tibiotarsus of a non-hesperornithid hesperornithiform is described from the Upper Cretaceous (Maastrichtian) Kita-ama Formation (Japan) by Tanaka et al. (2020), representing the first hesperornithiform record from marine Maastrichtian deposits in Asia reported so far, and indicating that the habitat of hesperornithiforms during the Maastrichtian extended to both terrestrial and marine environments in Asia and North America.
- A study on the anatomy of the skeleton of Parahesperornis alexi is published by Bell & Chiappe (2020), who report that this taxon possessed a mosaic of basal and derived traits found among other hesperornithiform taxa.
- A study on melanosome morphologies in two lithornithid specimens from the Eocene Green River Formation (United States), evaluating their implications for reconstructions of coloration in lithornithids and for the knowledge of color evolution in palaeognaths, is published by Eliason & Clarke (2020).
- Evidence of the presence of the bill tip organ in lithornithids is presented by du Toit, Chinsamy & Cunningham (2020), who interpret their findings as indicating that remote-touch probe foraging evolved very early among the Neornithes and may even have predated the palaeognathous–neognathous divergence.
- A study on the life history of the elephant birds, as indicated by bone histology, is published by Chinsamy et al. (2020).
- A study on the evolutionary history of the ostriches in Africa and Eurasia during the Miocene, Pliocene and Pleistocene, as indicated by data from eggshell and bone fossil record, is published by Mikhailov & Zelenkov (2020).
- A dentary fragment of a pelagornithid bird with an estimated body size on par with the largest known members of Pelagornithidae is described from the Eocene Submeseta Formation (Seymour Island, Antarctica) by Kloess, Poust & Stidham (2020), who interpret this finding as evidence of early evolution of giant body size in Pelagornithidae.
- A study on the flight capacity of Pelagornis chilensis is published by Meza-Vélez (2020).
- Volkova & Zelenkov (2020) describe new fossil material of geese from the late Miocene locality Khyargas Nuur 2 in western Mongolia, and evaluate the implications of these fossils for the knowledge of the late Miocene evolution and paleogeography of geese.
- A coracoid of a small-bodied paraortygid is reported from the Uinta Formation (Utah, United States) by Stidham, Townsend & Holroyd (2020), representing the only known pangalliform from the middle Eocene of North America, occurring in a temporal gap in their history between the early Eocene Gallinuloides wyomingensis and late Eocene Nanortyx inexpectus.
- A revision of the fossil material from Ukraine attributed to Plioperdix pontica, and a study on the taxonomy of small phasianids of the Neogene-Pleistocene in the Northern Black Sea region and Eastern Europe, is published by Zelenkov & Gorobets (2020).
- Barton et al. (2020) reinterpret purported chicken specimens from the Neolithic site at Dadiwan as remains of pheasants, and argue that these remains provide evidence of exploitation of grain-fed pheasants by early farmers in arid northwest China.
- Lawal et al. (2020) report that chicken was domesticated 8,000 years ago from its primary ancestor, Red junglefowl and that the genome of chicken was subsequently enhanced through introgression with the other three junglefowls i.e. Grey junglefowl, Sri Lankan junglefowl, and Green junglefowl.
- A study on the origin and history of domestication of chickens, as indicated by data from domestic chicken and wild jungle fowl genomes, is published by Wang et al. (2020), who interpret their findings as indicating that domestic chickens were initially derived from the red junglefowl subspecies Gallus gallus spadiceus, and that they interbred locally with other subspecies of the red junglefowl and with other jungle fowl species after their domestication.
- Partial skull of a large-bodied crane with a long beak, representing the oldest record of the subfamily Gruinae reported so far and expanding the known temporal range for the occurrence of large-sized cranes in Europe, is described from the Miocene (Tortonian) locality Hammerschmiede (Bavaria, Germany) by Mayr, Lechner & Böhme (2020).
- A study comparing the osteology of plotopterids and Paleocene stem group penguins is published by Mayr et al. (2020).
- New fossil material of Macranhinga ranzii is described from the Miocene Solimões Formation (Brazil) by Guilherme et al. (2020), who also study the phylogenetic relationships of this species.
- A study on the morphological diversity of bills of extant and fossil penguins, and its relationship with feeding habits, is published by Chávez-Hoffmeister (2020).
- Partial skeleton of an early penguin (possibly belonging to the species Muriwaimanu tuatahi), preserving the first complete wing of a Paleocene penguin reported so far and providing new information on the skeletal anatomy of this taxon, is described from the Waipara Greensand (New Zealand) by Mayr et al. (2020).
- An articulated wing of Palaeeudyptes gunnari, preserving mineralized skin, is described from the Eocene (Lutetian) of Seymour Island (Antarctica) by Acosta Hospitaleche et al. (2020).
- A study on the swimming capabilities of Inkayacu paracasensis is published by Meza-Vélez (2020).
- New fossil material of Anhinga pannonica is described from the Miocene (Tortonian) of the Hammerschmiede clay pit (Bavaria, Germany) by Mayr, Lechner & Böhme (2020), who also reinterpret the putative Miocene cormorant Phalacrocorax brunhuberi as another, previously misclassified, record of A. pannonica.
- New fossil material of penguins and a member of Gruiformes is reported from the Eocene La Meseta and Submeseta Formations of the Seymour Island by Davis et al. (2020), supporting previously controversial reports of Gruiformes from Antarctica.
- Partial tibiotarsus of an owl (possibly a member of Selenornithinae) is described from the Oligocene of the Jebel Qatrani Formation (Egypt) by Smith, Stidham & Mitchell (2020), representing the first occurrence of a fossil owl from the Paleogene of Africa reported so far.
- Part of a maxilla of a member of the genus Tockus is described from the early Miocene of Napak (Uganda) by Riamon et al. (2020), representing the earliest fossil of a hornbill reported so far.
- A nearly complete passerine specimen is described from the early Oligocene of Revest-des-Brousses (Luberon, Alpes-de-Haute-Provence, France) by Riamon, Tourment & Louchart (2020), who interpret this specimen as a member of Tyranni, most likely belonging to the stem group of Tyrannida.
- New fossil material of larks is reported from the late Pliocene localities in Transbaikalia (Russia) and Mongolia by Palastrova & Zelenkov (2020), who transfer the species Pliocalcarius orkhonensis to the genus Eremophila, and evaluate the implications of their findings for the knowledge of the evolutionary history of larks.
- An exceptionally well-preserved bird carcass found in the Siberian permafrost and dated to approximately 44–49 ka BP is described by Dussex et al. (2020), who identify this specimen as a female horned lark, and evaluate the implications of this specimen for the knowledge of the evolution and biogeography of its species during the Pleistocene.
- New fossil material of Rhodospiza shaamarica is described from the Pliocene localities of Shaamar (northern Mongolia) and Beregovaya (south Transbaikalia, Russia) by Palastrova & Zelenkov (2020), who transfer this species to the genus Emberiza.
- A study on Pleistocene bird tracks from the Cape south coast of South Africa is published by Helm et al. (2020), who report six tracksites with tracks produced by large birds, possibly indicating the existence of large Pleistocene forms of extant bird taxa.
- A study on the impact of the climate changes of the last 35,000 years on small birds from the La Brea Tar Pits is published by Long, Prothero & Syverson (2020).
- A study comparing predicted breeding and wintering distributions for landbird species identified from the La Brea Tar Pits during the Last Glacial Maximum, aiming to determine if niche models successfully predict species' presence, to estimate the degree of species turnover, to evaluate the fluidity of life history strategies of birds from La Brea, and to compare niche breadths of bark-foraging birds from La Brea between the Last Glacial Maximum and the present, is published by Zink et al. (2020).
- New fossil material of seabirds, including remains of the little auk or a related species, is reported from the Pleistocene Kazusa and Shimosa groups (Japan) by Watanabe et al. (2020), who interpret this finding as possible evidence that the little auk more widespread in the North Pacific in the middle Pleistocene than it is today.
- A study comparing the bird communities of the Bahamian Archipelago (The Bahamas and Turks and Caicos Islands) during the Late Pleistocene, Holocene prior to human arrival and Late Holocene subsequent to human arrival, aiming to determine what drove changes in biodiversity of Bahamian birds throughout the Late Quaternary, is published by Steadman & Franklin (2020).
- A study on flightlessness in bird species known to have gone extinct since the rise of humans (i.e. in the Late Pleistocene and Holocene), aiming to determine the extent to which inferences about evolutionary transitions and rates of evolution of flightlessness in birds are biased by anthropogenic extinctions, is published by Sayol et al. (2020).

== Pterosaurs ==
=== New pterosaur taxa ===
| Name | Novelty | Status | Authors | Age | Type locality | Country | Notes | Images |
|---|---|---|---|---|---|---|---|---|
| Aerodraco | Gen. et comb. nov | Valid | Holgado & Pêgas | Early Cretaceous (Albian) | Cambridge Greensand | United Kingdom | A coloborhynchine pterosaur. The type species is "Pterodactylus" sedgwickii Owen (1859). | |
| Afrotapejara | Gen. et sp. nov | Valid | Martill et al. | Cretaceous | Kem Kem | Morocco | A tapejarid pterosaur. The type species is A. zouhri. | |
| Albadraco | Gen. et sp. nov | Valid | Solomon et al. | Late Cretaceous (Maastrichtian) | Sard | Romania | An azhdarchid pterosaur. The type species is A. tharmisensis. Announced in 2019; the final version of the article naming it was published in 2020. | |
| Apatorhamphus | Gen. et sp. nov | Valid | McPhee et al. | Middle Cretaceous (Albian/Cenomanian) | Kem Kem | Morocco | A possible chaoyangopterid azhdarchoid pterosaur. The type species is A. gyrostega. | |
| Ikrandraco | Gen. et sp. nov | Valid | Wang et al. | Early Cretaceous (Aptian) | Jiufotang | China | A non-anhanguerian pteranodontoid. The type species is Ikrandraco avatar. Announced in 2014; the correction including evidence of registration in ZooBank within the work itself was published in 2020. | |
| Leptostomia | Gen. et sp. nov | Valid | Smith et al. | Cretaceous (?Albian–Cenomanian) | Kem Kem | Morocco | A small, long-beaked pterosaur, likely a member of Azhdarchoidea. The type species is L. begaaensis. Announced in 2020; the final version of the article naming it was published in 2021. | |
| Luchibang | Gen. et sp. nov | Valid | Hone et al. | Early Cretaceous | Probably Jehol Group | China | A member of the family Istiodactylidae. The type species is L. xingzhe. Type specimen is later found to be a chimera. | |
| Luopterus | Gen. et comb. nov | Valid | Hone | Jurassic | Tiaojishan | China | A member of the family Anurognathidae; a new genus for "Dendrorhynchoides" mutoudengensis Lü & Hone (2012). | |
| Nicorhynchus | Gen. et comb. nov | Valid | Holgado & Pêgas | Cretaceous (Albian to Cenomanian) | Cambridge Greensand; Kem Kem Group | Morocco; United Kingdom | A coloborhynchine pterosaur. The type species is "Ornithocheirus" capito Seeley (1870); genus also includes "Coloborhynchus" fluviferox Jacobs et al. (2019). | |
| Ordosipterus | Gen. et sp. nov | Valid | Ji | Early Cretaceous | Luohandong | China | A member of the family Dsungaripteridae. The type species is O. planignathus. | |
| Otogopterus | Gen. et sp. nov | Valid | Ji & Zhang | Early Cretaceous | Luohandong | China | A member of the family Ctenochasmatidae. The type species is O. haoae. | |
| Uktenadactylus rodriguesae | Sp. nov | Valid | Holgado & Pêgas | Early Cretaceous (Barremian) | Wessex | United Kingdom | A coloborhynchine pterosaur. Originally described as a species of Uktenadactylus, subsequently transferred to the genus Tylodorhynchus. | |
| Wightia | Gen. et sp. nov | Valid | Martill et al. | Early Cretaceous (Barremian) | Wessex | United Kingdom | A tapejarid pterosaur. The type species is W. declivirostris. | |

=== Pterosaur research ===
- A study on the ingroup relationships within Pterosauria is published by Baron (2020), who names new clades Zambellisauria and Caviramidae.
- A study on the fusion process of the notarial elements of pterosaurs is published by Aires et al. (2020).
- A study on the evolution of the flight efficiency of pterosaurs is published by Venditti et al. (2020).
- A study aiming to determine diets of 17 pterosaur genera, as indicated by data from dental microwear texture analysis, is published by Bestwick et al. (2020).
- Mazin & Pouech (2020) describe non-pterodactyloid pterosaur tracks from the ichnological site known as "the Pterosaur Beach of Crayssac" (Tithonian; south-western France), evaluate the implications of these tracks for the knowledge of the terrestrial capabilities of non-pterodactyloid pterosaurs, and name a new ichnogenus Rhamphichnus.
- The record of pycnofibers in two specimens of anurognathid pterosaurs from the Jurassic of China interpreted by Yang et al. (2019) as showing diagnostic features of feathers is reexamined and challenged by Unwin & Martill (2020).
- A coleoid cephalopod specimen preserved with an associated tooth of a pterosaur (probably Rhamphorhynchus) is reported from the Upper Jurassic Altmühltal Formation (Germany) by Hoffmann et al. (2020), who evaluate the implications of this finding for the knowledge of feeding behaviours of Rhamphorhynchus.
- A study on changes in the skeletal anatomy during growth in Rhamphorhynchus muensteri is published by Hone et al. (2020), who consider it likely that R. muensteri was able to fly soon after hatching.
- A well-preserved basihyal is reported for the first time in a pterosaur specimen (possibly belonging to the species Gladocephaloideus jingangshanensis) from the Lower Cretaceous Yixian Formation (China) by Jiang et al. (2020).
- Jacobs et al. (2020) describe new fossil material of pterosaurs from the Kem Kem Beds (Morocco), bringing the Kem Kem pterosaur fauna up to at least nine species (of which three are ornithocheirids), and confirming that toothed pterosaurs remained diverse during the mid-Cretaceous.
- Fossil material of pterosaurs (including a large non-pteranodontian ornithocheiroid) is described from the Valanginian Rosablanca Formation by Cadena, Unwin & Martill (2020), representing the first record of pterosaurs from Colombia.
- New forelimb of a pteranodontoid pterosaur is described from the Lower Cretaceous Yixian Formation (China) by Jiang et al. (2020), who also revise the species Yixianopterus jingangshanensis.
- Averianov (2020) reassesses the taxonomy of the Lonchodectidae, transferring the species "Lonchodraco" machaerorhynchus (including L. microdon and Pterodactylus oweni) to the genus Ikrandraco.
- Martill et al. (2020) report evidence of the presence of clusters of circular foramina on the tip of the beak of Lonchodraco giganteus, interpret this finding as evidence of enhanced sensitivity of the rostrum tip, and argue that this pattern implies tactile feeding in L. giganteus.
- An ornithocheirid metacarpus, representing one of the geologically youngest ornithocheirid remains reported worldwide, is described from the Upper Cretaceous (Cenomanian) of the Crema Bonfil quarry (Coahuila, Mexico) by Frey et al. (2020), who evaluate the implications of this finding for the knowledge of the extinction of the toothed pterosaurs during the Late Cretaceous.
- Fossil material of a large pteranodontid pterosaur is described from the Campanian Beloe Ozero locality (Rybushka Formation; Saratov Oblast, Russia) by Averianov & Arkhangelsky (2020), who also review other putative records of pteranodontids in the Late Cretaceous of North America, Europe and Asia, and argue that Volgadraco bogolubovi is more likely to be a pteranodontid than azhdarchid.
- New tapejarid specimen, providing new information on the anatomy of the vertebral column of tapejarids, is described from the Aptian Crato Formation (Brazil) by Cheng et al. (2020).
- New information on the anatomy of Dsungaripterus weii (especially on the palatal region), based on the study of new and previously collected specimens, is published by Chen et al. (2020).
- New fossil material of Tethydraco regalis is described from the Maastrichtian deposits of the Ouled Abdoun Basin (Morocco) by Labita & Martill (2020), who consider it more likely that T. regalis was an azhdarchid rather than a pteranodontian.
- New specimens of edentulous pterosaur jaw fragments are described from the Cambridge Greensand (eastern England, United Kingdom) by Smith et al. (2020), who also revise the fossil material of Ornithostoma sedgwicki and assign this taxon to the group Azhdarchoidea rather than to the family Pteranodontidae.

== Other archosaurs ==
=== Other new archosaur taxa ===
| Name | Novelty | Status | Authors | Age | Type locality | Country | Notes | Images |
|---|---|---|---|---|---|---|---|---|
| Kongonaphon | Gen. et sp. nov | Valid | Kammerer et al. | Mid-to-Late Triassic | Isalo II | Madagascar | A member of the family Lagerpetidae. The type species is K. kely. | |

=== Other archosaur research ===
- A study on the anatomy, locomotion and phylogenetic relationships of Scleromochlus taylori is published by Bennett (2020).
- An Otischalkian assemblage of lagerpetid and silesaurid fossils, including lagerpetid material of unusually large size assignable to Dromomeron, is described from the Los Esteros Member of the Santa Rosa Formation (New Mexico, United States) by Beyl, Nesbitt & Stocker (2020), who interpret this finding as evidence that lagerpetids achieved large body size earlier than previously recognized.
- A study on the phylogenetic relationships of lagerpetids is published by Ezcurra et al. (2020), who interpret lagerpetids as the sister group of pterosaurs.
- New dinosauromorph fossil material is described from the Upper Triassic Chinle Formation (Petrified Forest National Park, Arizona, United States) by Marsh & Parker (2020), who also review the global fossil record of Late Triassic dinosauromorphs.
- A study on the musculoskeletal apparatus and posture of Silesaurus opolensis, evaluating its implications for the knowledge of the evolution of the fully erect limb posture in archosaurs, is published by Piechowski & Tałanda (2020).

== General research ==
- A study aiming to determine how mass properties and body proportions relate to each other and locomotor posture in archosaurs is published online by Bishop et al. (2020).
- A study on the brain growth in the American alligator and in the common ostrich throughout their ontogeny is published by Hu et al. (2020), who evaluate the implications of their findings for the knowledge of the development of the brain in non-avian dinosaurs.
- A study on the evolution of metabolic rates along the bird stem lineage is published by Rezende et al. (2020).
- A review of the anatomy of the respiratory systems and mechanics of breathing in living and fossil archosaurs, evaluating their physiological implications, is published by Brocklehurst et al. (2020).
- A study aiming to determine the relationship between atmospheric O_{2} and CO_{2} levels during the Late Triassic and the evolution of skeletal pneumaticity and respiratory systems in theropod dinosaurs and in paracrocodylomorphs is published by Hudgins, Uhen & Hinnov (2020).
- A study on sexual dimorphism in the skulls of extant gharials, and on its implications for the feasibility of detecting dimorphism in non-avian dinosaurs, is published by Hone et al. (2020).
- A study evaluating the impact of different sampling effects on calculations of mean von Ebner line increment width (the measure of dentin thickness divided by the mean width between von Ebner lines), tooth formation times and replacement rates in fossil archosaurs, based on data from extant American alligator, is published by Kosch & Zanno (2020).
- A study on the microstructure of teeth of Mesozoic birds and non-avian paravian theropods is published by Li et al. (2020), who evaluate the implications of their findings for the knowledge of differences in feeding ecology of early birds and closely related paravians.
- A study on the phylogenetic distribution and structural diversity of medullary bone in extant birds, reevaluating the criteria proposed to allow the identification of medullary bone in fossils of avemetatarsalians, is published by Canoville, Schweitzer & Zanno (2020).
- An archosaur egg of uncertain affinities, with eggshell containing several parallel dark bands, is reported from the Upper Cretaceous of South Korea by Choi et al. (2020), who investigate the origin of the dark bands, and name a new ootaxon Aenigmaoolithus vesicularis.
- A study on the relationship between the curvatures of ungual bones and behaviour in extant birds and squamates, evaluating its implications for the knowledge of the lifestyle of Mesozoic birds and non-avian theropods, is published by Cobb & Sellers (2020).
- Xing, Cockx & McKellar (2020) describe a large sample set of 150 specimens of the Cretaceous Burmese amber containing feathers most likely belonging to non-avian dinosaurs and enantiornithean birds.
