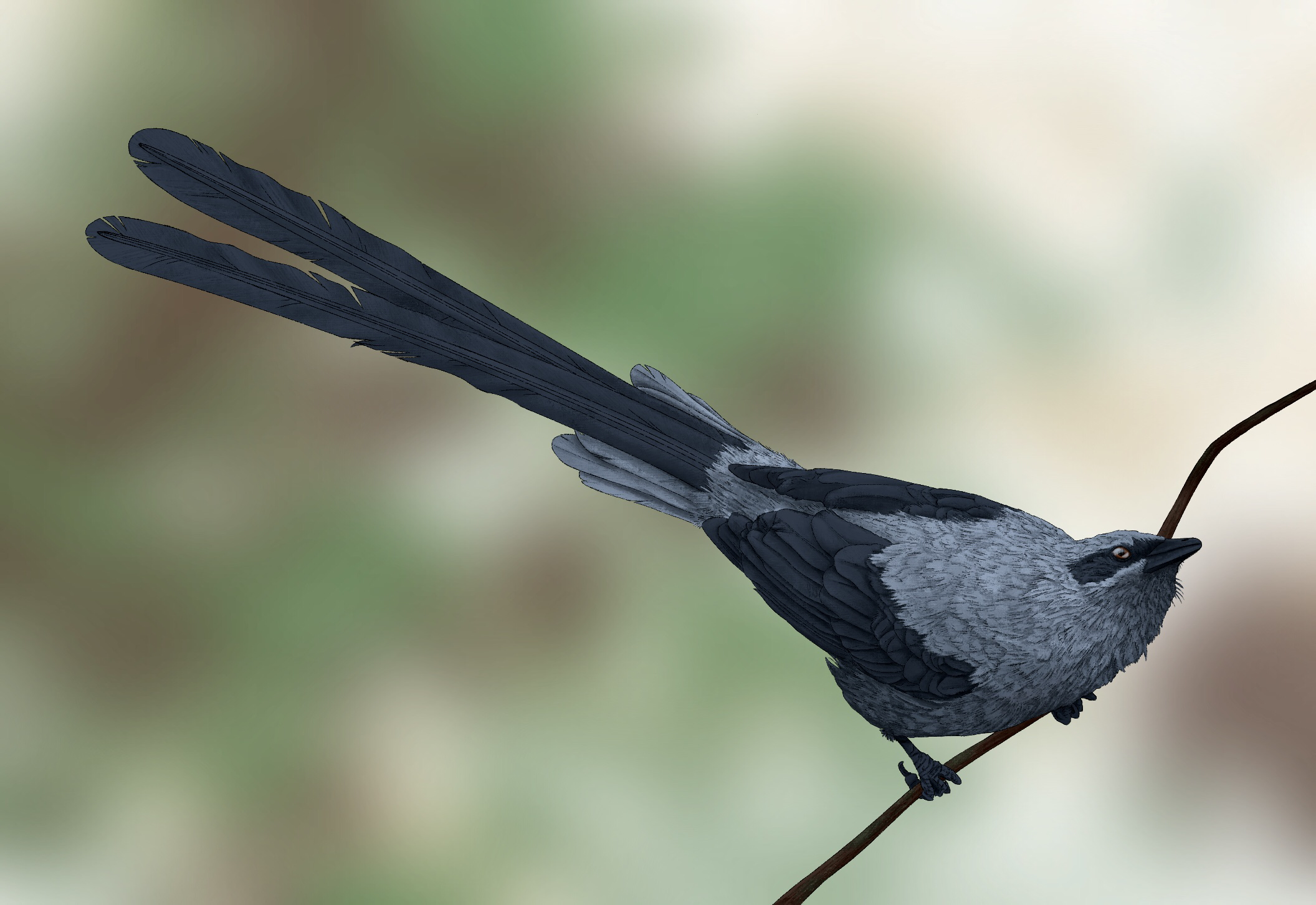
- Life reconstruction of Yuanchuavis kompsosoura.

Scientific classification
- Domain: Eukaryota
- Kingdom: Animalia
- Phylum: Chordata
- Clade: Dinosauria
- Clade: Saurischia
- Clade: Theropoda
- Clade: Avialae
- Clade: †Enantiornithes
- Family: †Pengornithidae
- Genus: †Yuanchuavis; Wang et al., 2021
- Species: †Y. kompsosoura

Binomial name
- †Yuanchuavis kompsosoura Wang et al., 2021

= Yuanchuavis =

Yuanchuavis Temporal range: Early Cretaceous, 120–113 Ma

Extinct genus of birds

Yuanchuavis (meaning "Yuanchu bird", after a mythical Chinese bird) is an extinct genus of pengornithid bird in the group Enantiornithes. Its type and only specimen, IVPP V27883, is the holotype for its only species, Y. kompsosoura (meaning "beautiful tail"). It was recovered from the Jiufotang Formation of China, and has a fossilized fan of highly graduated rectrices. The tail has graduation similar to Chiappeavis and a pair of highly elongate central rectrices similar to the pintails of extant male sunbirds. Melanosomes sampled from the holotype suggest the central pair of rectrices to be dark in colour, and the rest of the tail feathers to be either grey or with non-iridescent structural colour.

== See also ==
- Dinosaur coloration
