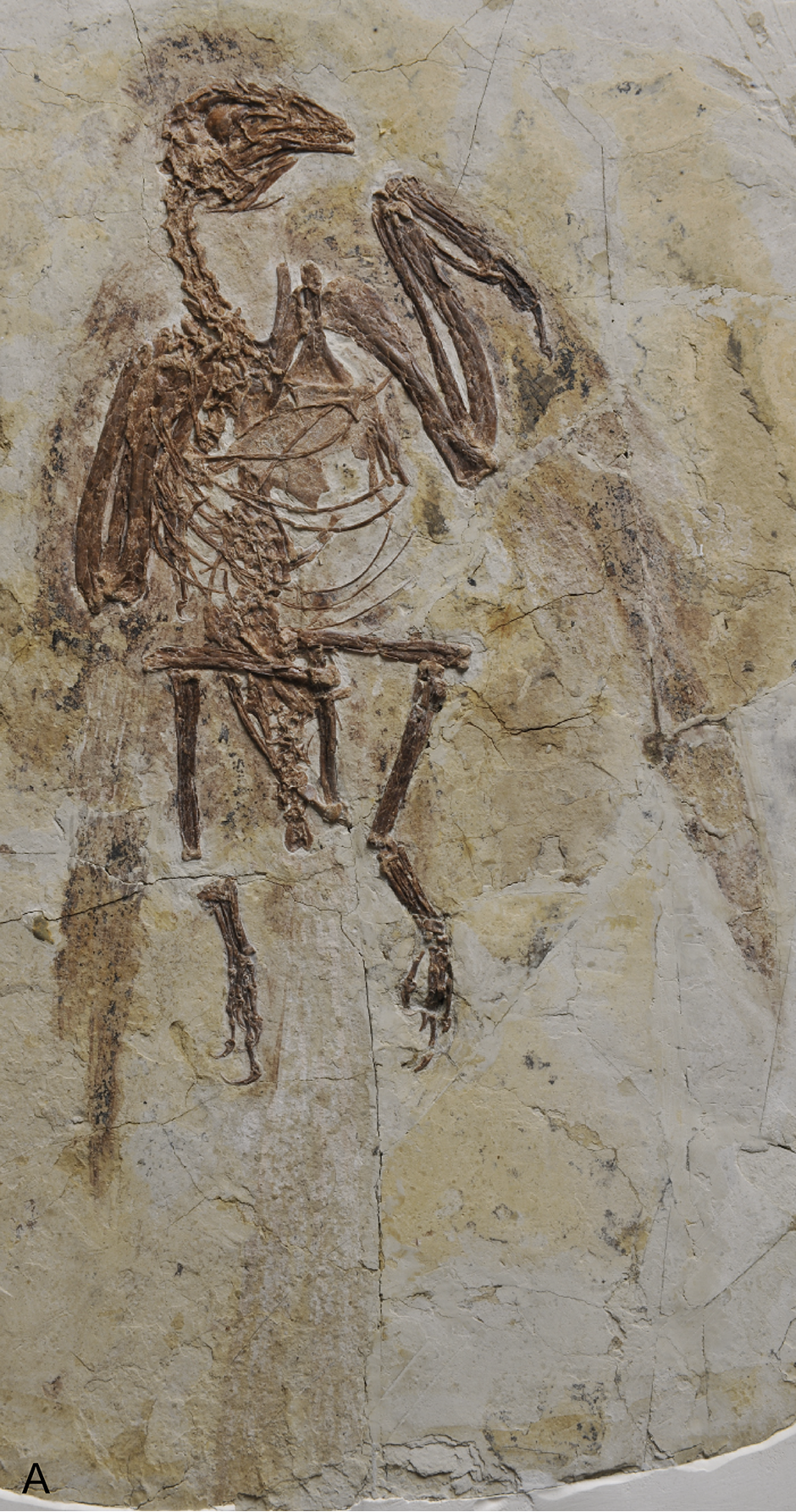
- Fossil specimen of Parapengornis eurycaudatus

Scientific classification
- Kingdom: Animalia
- Phylum: Chordata
- Class: Reptilia
- Clade: Dinosauria
- Clade: Saurischia
- Clade: Theropoda
- Clade: Avialae
- Clade: †Enantiornithes
- Family: †Pengornithidae; Wang et al., 2014

Type genus
- †Pengornis Zhou, Clarke, & Zhang, 2008

Genera
- †Chiappeavis; †Eopengornis; †Falcatakely?; †Parapengornis; †Pengornis; †Yuanchuavis

= Pengornithidae =

Pengornithids Temporal range: Early Cretaceous, 130.7–113 Ma (possible Late Cretaceous record)

Extinct family of birds

Pengornithidae is a group of early enantiornithines from the early Cretaceous Period of China, with the putative member Falcatakely possibly extending this clade's range into the Late Cretaceous of Madagascar, and several putative pengornithids also hail from this formation. Specimens of these animals have been found both in the Huajiying Formation and Jiufotang Formation of Liaoning and Hebei provinces, dating from the Hauterivian age (130.7 million years ago) to the Aptian age (120 million years ago).

== Description ==
Pengornithids were basal enantiornithes. They had many small teeth in their jaws, and stout legs. Their internal anatomy was characterized by a hooked outgrowth of the shoulder blade and a pygostyle (the tail bone to which long feathers attach) which was short and rounded, instead of long and blade-shaped as in other enantiornithes. While most enantiornithes had four long backward projections growing from their breastbones, pengornithids only had two.

Assuming Falcatakely is a pengornithid, it exhibits a rather novel cranial morphology compared to other enantiornitheans, having a toucan-like snout ending on small teeth.

== Ecology ==
The unique, rounded pygostyle and long, stiff tail feathers of pengornithids would have made their tail overall similar to that of woodpeckers. The feet of pengornithids were also particularly adapted for grasping branches. These features indicate that while pengornithids may not have been as adept at climbing as many modern birds, they were better climbers than many other enantiornithes.

Falcatakely has been compared to toucans due to similar snout morphology.

== Classification ==
The cladogram below was found in the phylogenetic analysis of Hu et al. 2014.

- Enantiornithes
  - Protopteryx
  - - Elsornis
    - - - Rapaxavis
        - Iberomesornis
        - - Shanweiniao
          - Longirostravis
      - Euenantiornithes
        - - - Boluochia
            - Longipteryx
          - - Vescornis
            - Otogornis
            - Gobipteryx
        - - Eocathayornis
          - - Shenqiornis
            - - Pengornithidae
                - - Eopengornis
                  - IVPP V18632
                - - Parapengornis
                  - Pengornis
              - - Neuquenornis
                - - Eoenantiornis
                  - - - Liaoningornis
                      - Eoalulavis
                    - - Concornis
                      - Cathayornis

The cladogram below was found by an analysis by Wang et al. in 2015, updated from a previous data set created by Jingmai O'Connor.

- Ornithothoraces
  - Euornithes
  - †Enantiornithes
    - †Protopteryx
    - †Pengornithidae
    - †Longipterygidae
    - †Euenantiornithes
      - †Eocathayornis
      - - †Elsornis
        - - †Dunhuangia
          - †Fortunguavis
          - - †Bohaiornithidae
            - - †Pterygornis
              - - †Eoenantiornis
                - - †Cathayornis
                  - - †Vescornis
                    - †Neuquenornis
                    - †Gobipteryx
                    - †Eoalulavis
                    - - †Qiliania
                      - †Concornis
