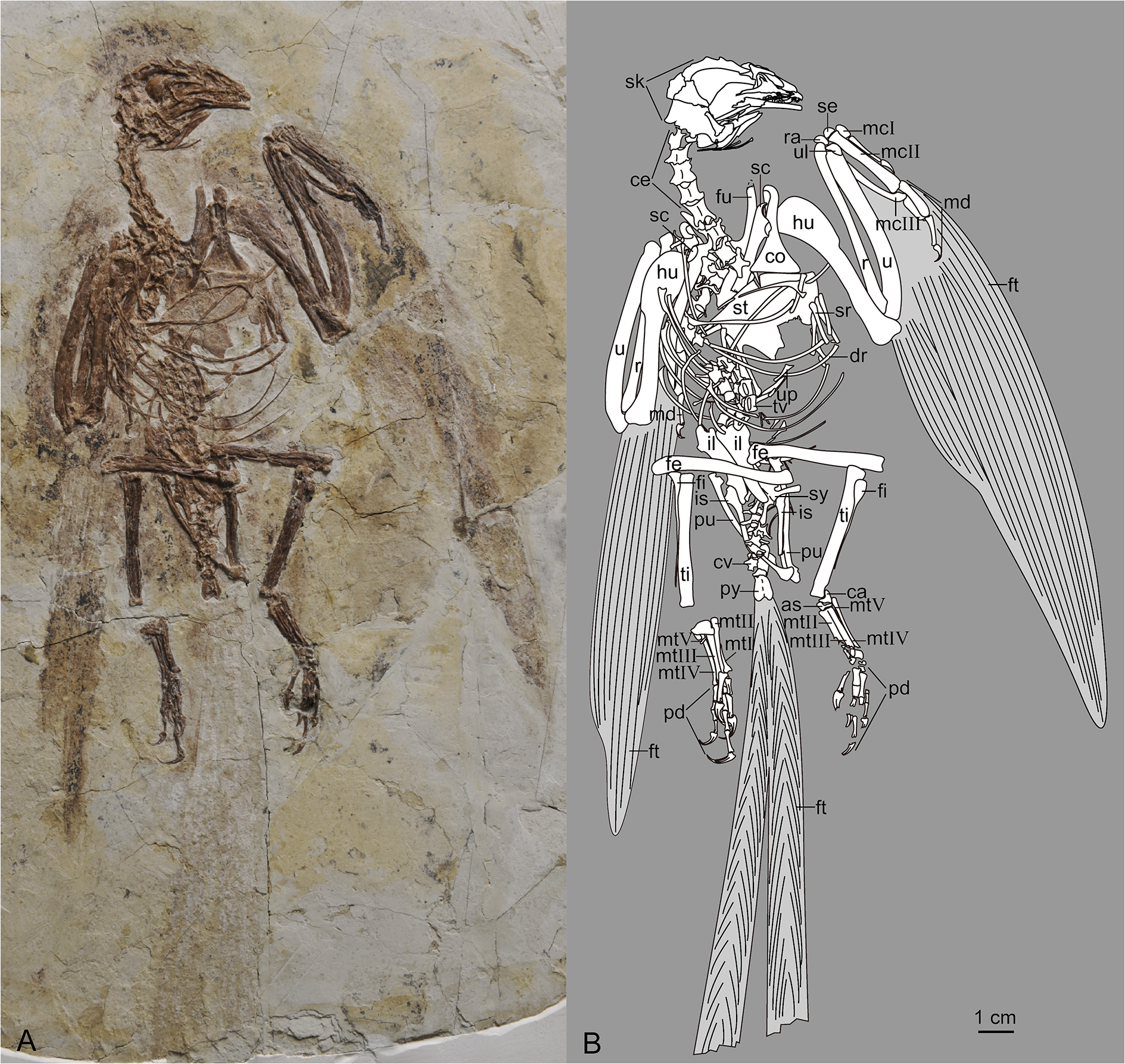
- Holotype fossil and diagram

Scientific classification
- Kingdom: Animalia
- Phylum: Chordata
- Class: Reptilia
- Clade: Dinosauria
- Clade: Saurischia
- Clade: Theropoda
- Clade: Avialae
- Clade: †Enantiornithes
- Family: †Pengornithidae
- Genus: †Parapengornis; Hu et al., 2015
- Species: †P. eurycaudatus

Binomial name
- †Parapengornis eurycaudatus Hu et al., 2015

= Parapengornis =

Parapengornis Temporal range: Lower Cretaceous, 120 Ma

Extinct genus of birds

Parapengornis is an extinct genus of enantiornithean bird from the Lower Cretaceous of what is now China. The holotype specimen was discovered in the Jiufotang Formation near Lingyuan, western Liaoning province, and was catalogued as IVPP V18687. The nearly complete, articulated specimen is preserved on a slab and has impressions of pennaceous feathers. Only parts of the sternum, the left hand, and right foot are missing. In 2015, it became the basis of the new genus and species Parapengornis eurycaudatus, named by the Chinese palaeontologists Han Hu, Jingmai K. O'Connor, and Zhonghe Zhou. The generic name consists of the Latin word para and the name of the related genus Pengornis, indicating their close relationship. The name Pengornis is itself derived from "Peng", a mythological bird from Chinese folklore, and ornis, which means bird in Greek. The specific name is derived from the Latin words eury, meaning broad, and caudatus, meaning tail, in reference to the broad and expanded pygostyle (the last fused vertebrae of a bird's tail). A nearly complete specimen formerly assigned to Pengornis was also reassigned to Parapengornis by these authors.

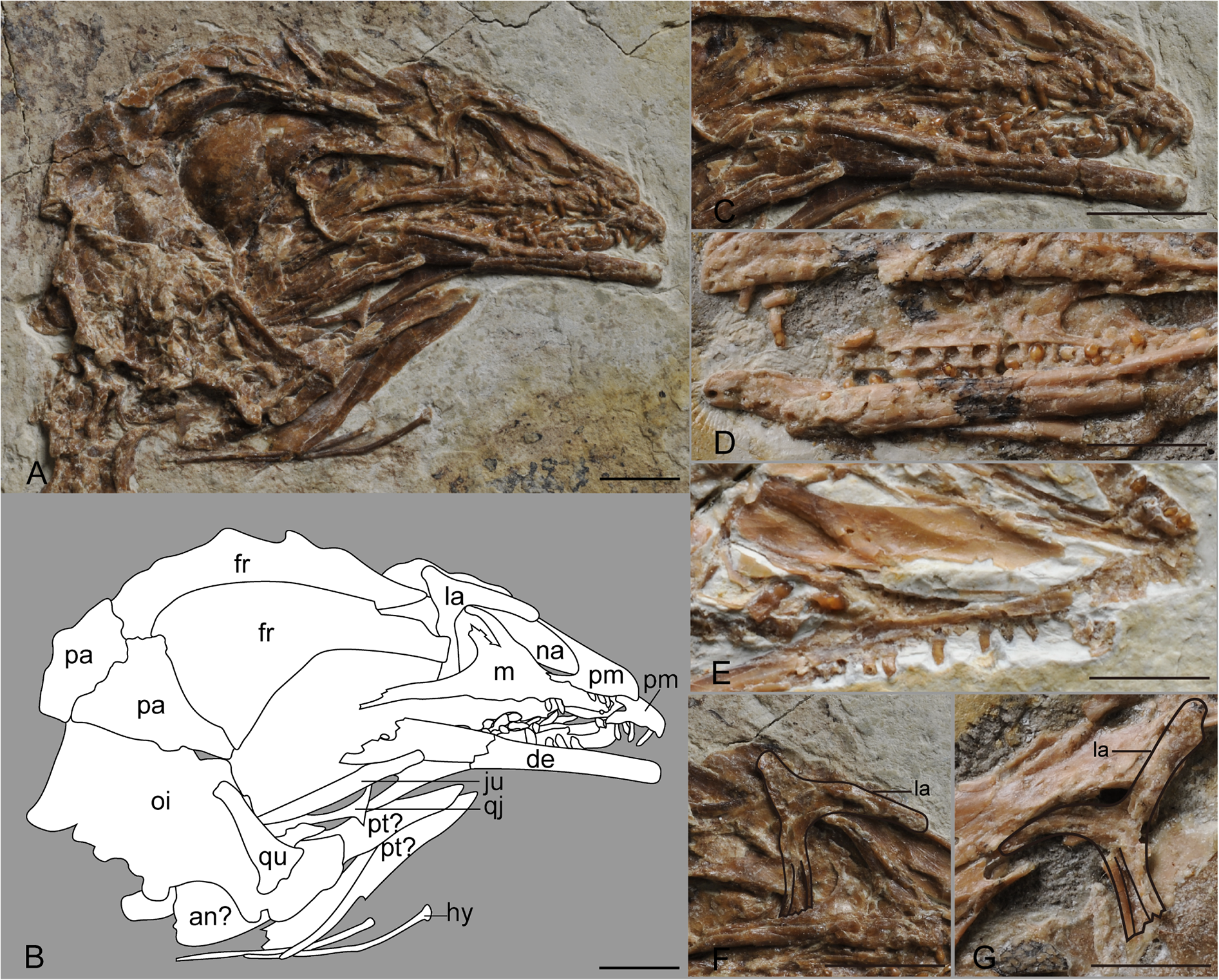
Skull and teeth compared to those of other pengornithids

Parapengornis was a large pengornithid, distinguished from its relatives by a combination of features such as the many slender, constricted teeth with pointed and recurved apices, with short cervical (neck) vertebrae at the front, but those further back elongated, a broad pygostyle, and a Y-shaped furcula (wishbone). Hu and colleagues found physical similarities between Parapengornis and scansorial (tree-dwelling) birds such as woodpeckers, and suggested it could have been specialised for climbing vertically and clinging (which had not been previously suggested for early birds, and would add to the diversity of ecological niches occupied by enantiornitheans). They also suggested that the pennaceous feathers dominated by rhachis and the shape of the pygostyle may have had a significance for their function.

In 2017, Wang Wei and O'Connor argued against the earlier hypothesis that Parapengornis was woodpecker-like, and found the pygostyle similar to those of other pengornithids, and that the tail feathers could not have worked as a prop. They instead found the tail feathers similar to those of arboreal birds such as the paradise-flycatchers.In 2017, Nikita V. Zelenkov criticised the idea that Parapengornis was especially adapted for climbing trees.
