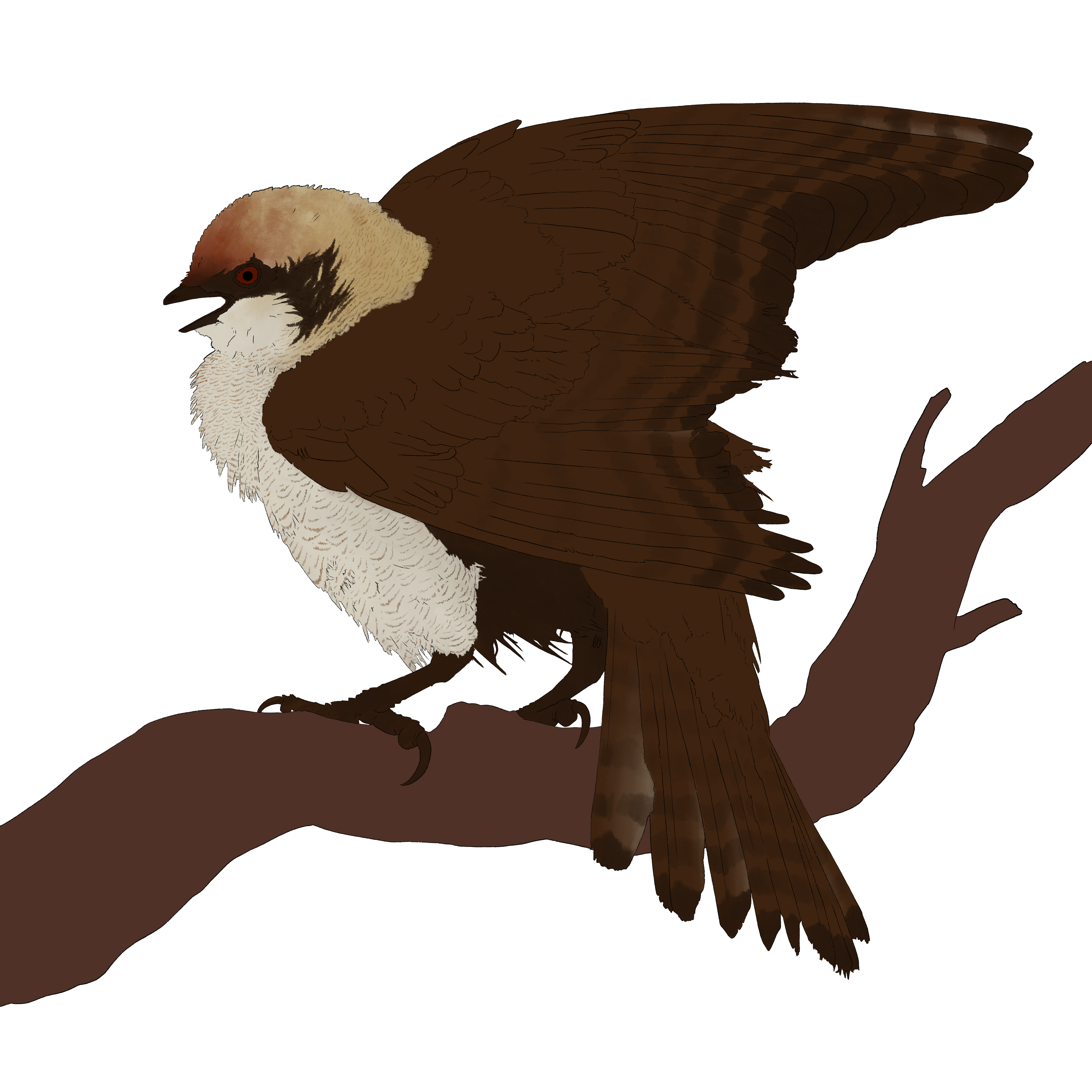
- Artist's restoration.

Scientific classification
- Kingdom: Animalia
- Phylum: Chordata
- Class: Reptilia
- Clade: Dinosauria
- Clade: Saurischia
- Clade: Theropoda
- Clade: Avialae
- Clade: †Enantiornithes
- Family: †Pengornithidae
- Genus: †Chiappeavis; O'Connor et al., 2016
- Species: †C. magnapremaxillo

Binomial name
- †Chiappeavis magnapremaxillo O'Connor et al., 2016

= Chiappeavis =

Chiappeavis Temporal range: Early Cretaceous, 120 Ma

Extinct genus of birds

Chiappeavis is a genus of enantiornithean bird from Early Cretaceous of northeastern China. The only species is Chiappeavis magnapremaxillo. Chiappeavis is classified within the family Pengornithidae. It is known from a single, almost complete skeleton including feather impressions discovered in the Jiufotang Formation of the Jehol Group. Long feathers formed a fan-shaped tail that was probably employed in flight.

The genus name honors Luis Chiappe for his extensive research on Mesozoic birds. The specific name magnapremaxillo ("large premaxilla") alludes to the unusually large size of the premaxillary bone, the frontmost bone of the upper jaw.

The only specimen (holotype, STM29-11), of a subadult individual, was discovered on a single slab in Jianchang County, Liaoning. Is housed in the Shandong Tianyu Museum of Nature in Pingyi County, Shandong.

== Description ==
Chiappeavis was large for a pengornithid. The skull was triangular in side view with a blunt snout tip. The tip of the lower jaw is slightly upturned due to the convex underside of the premaxilla. Teeth were either absent in the genus or are not preserved in the only known fossil. However, the absence of teeth in the related Gobipteryx makes it likely that Chiappeavis was edentulous (toothless).

The holotype fossil preserves impressions of the wing and tail feathers. Approximately ten rectrices (long tail feathers) were present; the middle two were the longest (ca. 74 mm), and the outermost the shortest (ca. 56 mm). The rectrices were anchored in a fused mass of tail vertebrae, the pygostyle, which was wide and short, as typical for pengornithids. The much broader remiges of the wings were up to 140 mm in length.

The genus can be differentiated from related genera by a number of unique features, including the convex lower margin of the premaxilla; the long nasal process of the premaxilla (rearwards extension of the premaxilla) that almost reaches the frontal bones behind; a sacrum consisting of eight vertebrae; the concave outer margin of the inner trabeculae; and the inclined upper end of the tibia.
