= Jacamatia =

Jacamatia Temporal range: Early Oligocene

Scientific classification
- Kingdom: Animalia
- Phylum: Chordata
- Class: Aves
- Order: Piciformes
- Suborder: Galbuli
- Genus: †Jacamatia
- Species: †J. luberonensis

Binomial name
- †Jacamatia luberonensis Duhamel et al., 2020

Extinct genus of birds

Jacamatia is an extinct genus of bird that lived during the Rupelian stage of the Oligocene epoch.

== Distribution ==
Jacamatia luberonensis fossils have been found in France.
