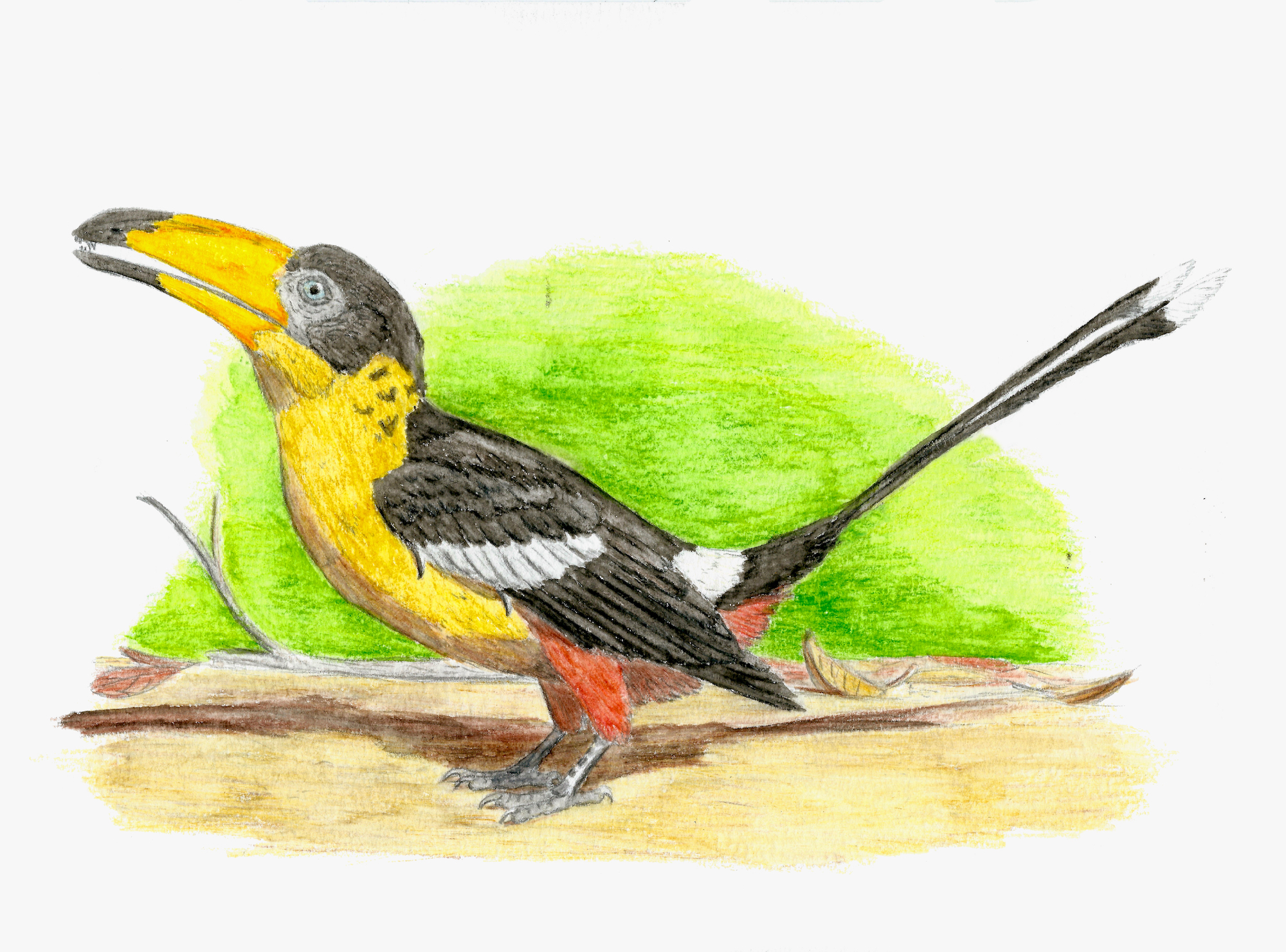
- Life restoration of Falcatakely forsterae as an enantiornithean

Scientific classification
- Kingdom: Animalia
- Phylum: Chordata
- Class: Reptilia
- Clade: Dinosauria
- Clade: Saurischia
- Clade: Theropoda
- Clade: Avialae
- Clade: Ornithothoraces
- Clade: †Enantiornithes
- Genus: †Falcatakely; O'Connor et al., 2020
- Species: †F. forsterae

Binomial name
- †Falcatakely forsterae O'Connor et al., 2020

= Falcatakely =

Falcatakely Temporal range: Late Cretaceous, Maastrichtian

Extinct genus of birds

Falcatakely forsterae (meaning "small scythe" from the Latin falcatus and Malagasy kely, in reference to the shape of the beak) is an extinct genus of enantiornithean that lived during the period Upper Cretaceous, approximately 68 to 70 million years ago, in what is now Madagascar. Its fossil remains date back to the Maevarano Formation bird known from partial fossils from northern Madagascar. The genus contains a single species, Falcatakely forsterae.

== Description ==
Falcatakely was a crow-sized stem-bird that can be distinguished from all other enantiornitheans by its deep, long rostrum, approx. 9 centimetres (3.5 inch) in length, which is slightly reminiscent of that of a toucan. Despite this resemblance, the upper jaw had more in common with that of the non-avian theropods in being dominated by a large maxilla, while the smaller premaxilla made up the tip of the rostrum. This is the opposite arrangement of what we see in modern birds, where the upper beak is dominated by the premaxilla, which in Falcatakely still had teeth.

== Classification ==
The describers' phylogenetic analyses all place Falcatakely in the Enantiornithes, though its precise position is unclear. It has been recovered as a basal enantiornithean, the sister taxon of Pengornis, and in a polytomy with many other enantiornitheans.

== Paleoenvironment ==
Falcatakely is known from the Maevarano Formation, then a swampy floodplain which seasonally alternated between being swampland in the wet season and dry semi-desert during the dry season; it was home to other unusual animals such as Simosuchus, a herbivorous crocodylomorph, Masiakasaurus, a short-armed, buck-toothed theropod, and Adalatherium, a highly unusual mammal. These forms may have evolved due to Madagascar being an isolated island during the Cretaceous.
