= Cousteauvia =

Scientific classification
- Kingdom: Animalia
- Phylum: Chordata
- Class: Aves
- Order: Anseriformes
- Genus: †Cousteauvia; Nikita V. Zelenkov, 2020
- Species: †C. kustovia

Binomial name
- †Cousteauvia kustovia Nikita V. Zelenkov, 2020

Extinct genus of diving duck

Cousteauvia is an extinct genus of diving anseriform. It contains a single species, Cousteauvia kustovia. The species is the earliest known diving duck, having been recovered from Priabonian deposits. It was discovered in East Kazakhstan by Russian paleontologist Nikita Zelenkov in 2020.

== Etymology ==
The genus name Cousteauvia of this species is named, in honor from French explorer, Jacques Cousteau. Meanwhile, its species name Kustov was taken from Kusto Svita, the place where it was discovered by Nikita Zelenkov.

== Description ==
The bones discovered by Nikita Zelenkov was a tarsometatarsus, it is high and has only two pronounced crests bordering one medial canal (for the tendon of m. flexor dig-itorum longus) together with a plantarly located sulcus. This structure of the hypotarsus is definitively more derived than in Anhimidae and fossil Presbyornithidae, which have only one medial sulcus.

== Ecology ==
Based on the thick bone walls of Cousteauvia, it may have been a specialized diver. Also, based on the remains. Cousteauvia was a quick and also imperfect swimmer as compared with the modern ducks of today. Its diet consists of small aquatic prey.
