= Dobrosturnus =

Dobrosturnus Temporal range: Middle Miocene

Scientific classification
- Kingdom: Animalia
- Phylum: Chordata
- Class: Aves
- Order: Passeriformes
- Family: Sturnidae
- Genus: †Dobrosturnus
- Species: †D. kardamensis

Binomial name
- †Dobrosturnus kardamensis Boev, 2020

Extinct genus of birds

Dobrosturnus is an extinct genus of starling that lived during the Middle Miocene subepoch.

== Distribution ==
Dobrosturnus kardamensis fossils are known from Bulgaria.
