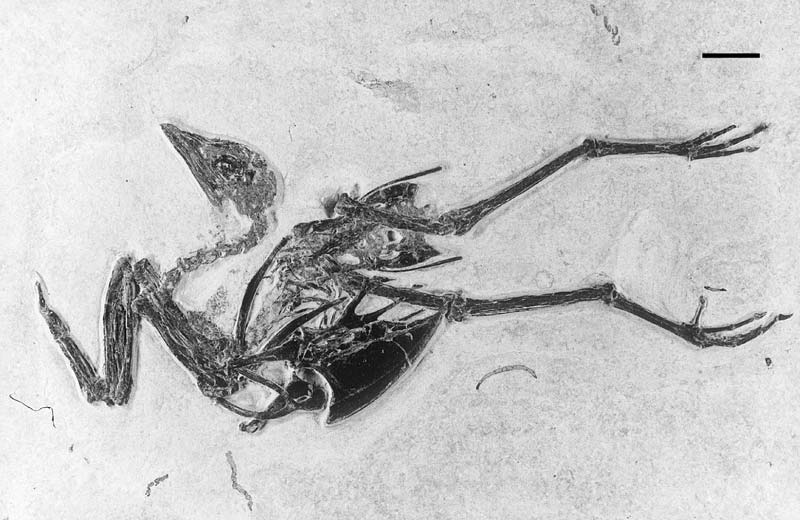
- Holotype

Scientific classification
- Kingdom: Animalia
- Phylum: Chordata
- Class: Aves
- Family: †Gallinuloididae
- Genus: †Gallinuloides; Eastman, 1900
- Species: †G. wyomingensis

Binomial name
- †Gallinuloides wyomingensis Eastman, 1900

Synonyms
- Gallunoides is a lapsus.

= Gallinuloides =

Gallinuloides Temporal range: Early-middle Eocene

Extinct genus of birds

Gallinuloides is a prehistoric genus of pangalliform bird. It lived about 48 million years ago in North America. The type specimen was found in a Green River Formation deposit in Wyoming.

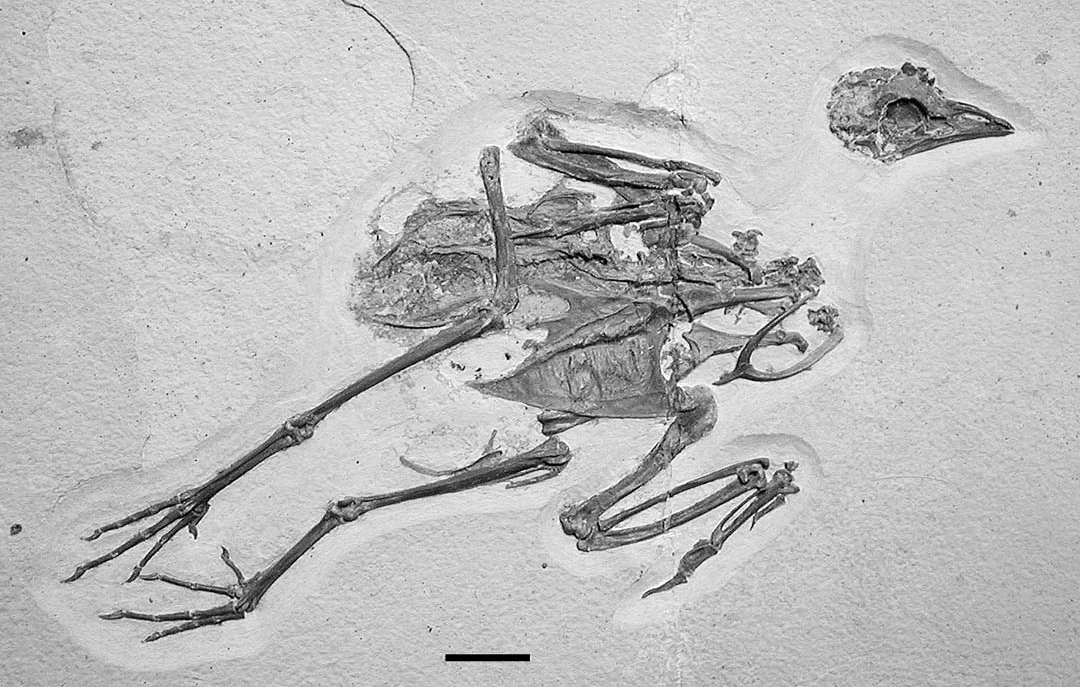
Specimen WDC CGR−012

The former Gallinuloides prentici was eventually placed (after a brief stint in Grus) in a distinct genus Paragrus; it is no pangalliform but belongs to the Geranoididae (Lambrecht 1933:520).
