= Vinchinavis =

Vinchinavis Temporal range: Messinian

Scientific classification
- Kingdom: Animalia
- Phylum: Chordata
- Class: Aves
- Order: Accipitriformes
- Family: Accipitridae
- Genus: †Vinchinavis
- Species: †V. paka

Binomial name
- †Vinchinavis paka Tambussi et al., 2021

Extinct genus of birds

Vinchinavis is an extinct genus of eagle that lived during the Messinian stage of the Miocene epoch.

== Distribution ==
Vinchinavis paka fossils are known from the Toro Negro Formation of Argentina.
