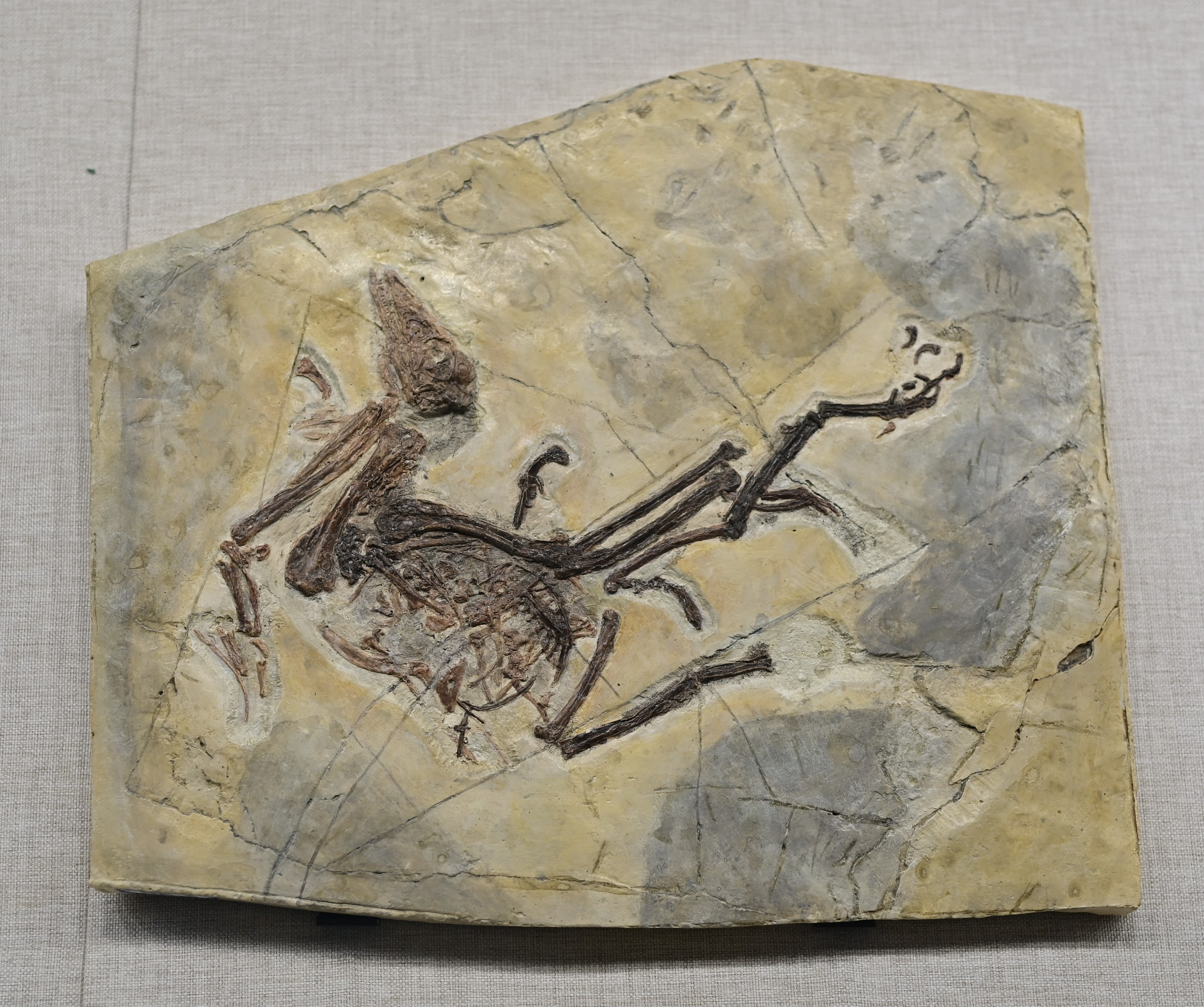
- Cast of holotype (IVPP V15336)

Scientific classification
- Kingdom: Animalia
- Phylum: Chordata
- Class: Reptilia
- Clade: Dinosauria
- Clade: Saurischia
- Clade: Theropoda
- Clade: Avialae
- Clade: †Enantiornithes
- Family: †Pengornithidae
- Genus: †Pengornis; Zhou, Clarke, & Zhang, 2008
- Species: †P. houi

Binomial name
- †Pengornis houi Zhou, Clarke, & Zhang, 2008

= Pengornis =

Pengornis Temporal range: Early Cretaceous, 120 Ma

Extinct genus of birds

Pengornis is the largest known enantiornithean bird from the Early Cretaceous of northeast China. The name derives from "Peng", which refers to a mythological bird from Chinese folklore, and "-ornis", which means bird in Greek.

Pengornis was originally known from a single adult fossil, described by Zhou et al. in 2008. This holotype is in the collection of the Institute of Vertebrate Paleontology and Paleoanthropology in Beijing China. Its accession number is IVPP V15336. It was collected from the Jiufotang Formation, at Dapingfang, Chaoyang, Liaoning China. A second, juvenile specimen, IVPP V18632, was described by Hu, Zhou, and O'Connor in 2014. In 2015 this was referred to Parapengornis.

Pengornis shows characters of the humeral head, acromion, and anterior cervical vertebrae, that were previously known only in members of the Ornithurae. A phylogenetic analysis by Zhou et al. reduces to just three the number of characters that support enantiornithean monophyly. Thus, Pengornis supports the possibility that Enantiornithes and Ornithurae may not be distinct clades.
