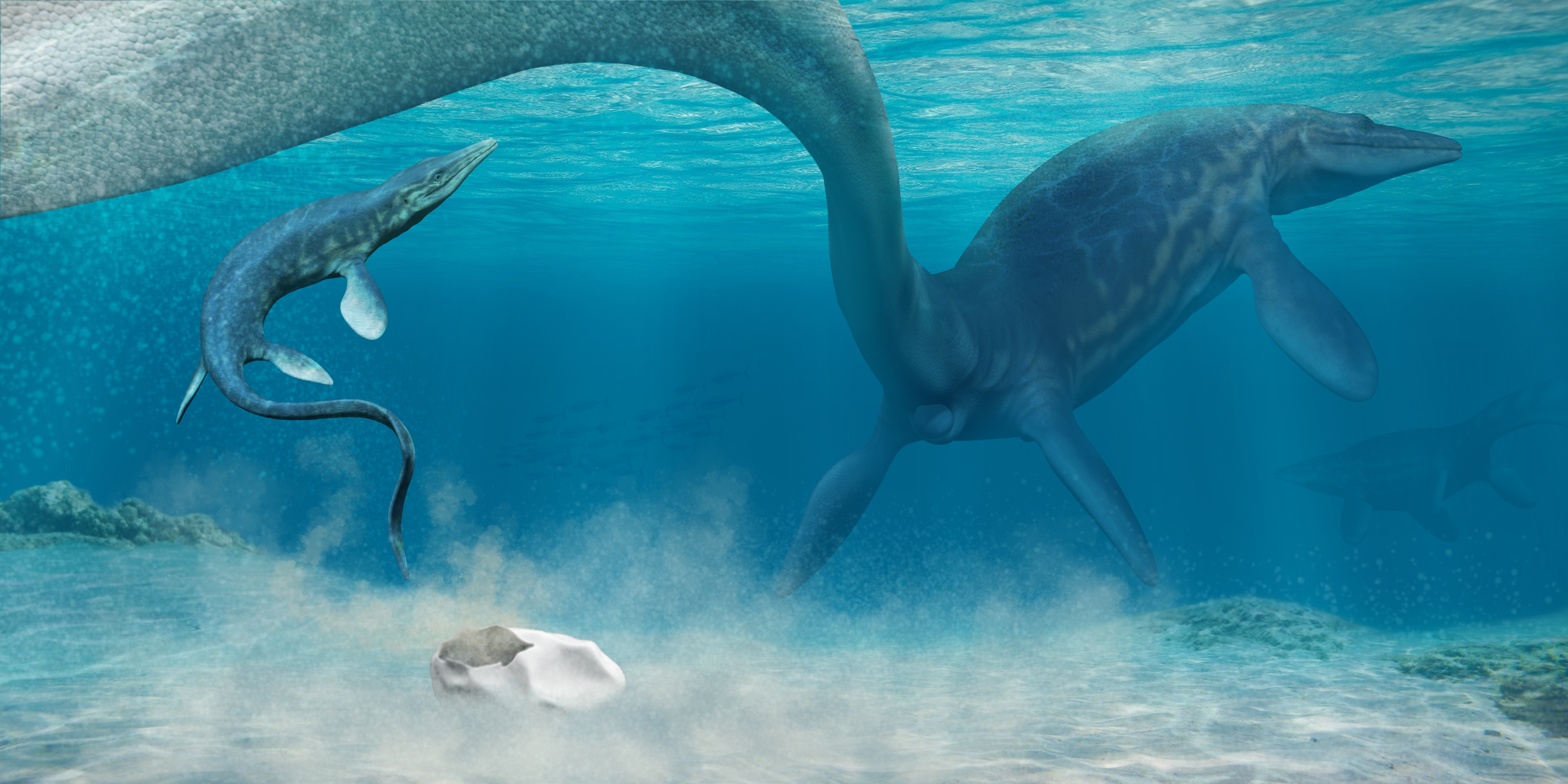
- Life restoration showing it as a mosasaur egg

Egg fossil classification
- Oofamily: †Mosasauroid
- Oogenus: †Antarcticoolithus; Legendre et al., 2020

Oospecies
- †A. bradyi Legendre et al., 2020

= Antarcticoolithus =

Antarcticoolithus Temporal range: Maastrichtian ~68 Ma

Oogenus of large fossil eggs

Antarcticoolithus is an oogenus of large fossil eggs from the Maastrichtian part of the López de Bertodano Formation of Seymour Island, Antarctica. The genus contains the type species A. bradyi, described by Legendre et al. in 2020. The fossil egg, the first found in Antarctica, was discovered in 2011 by a Chilean team of researchers. They named the egg fossil "The Thing" in reference to the movie. The fossil measures 11 by 7 inches (28 by 18 cm).

== Description ==
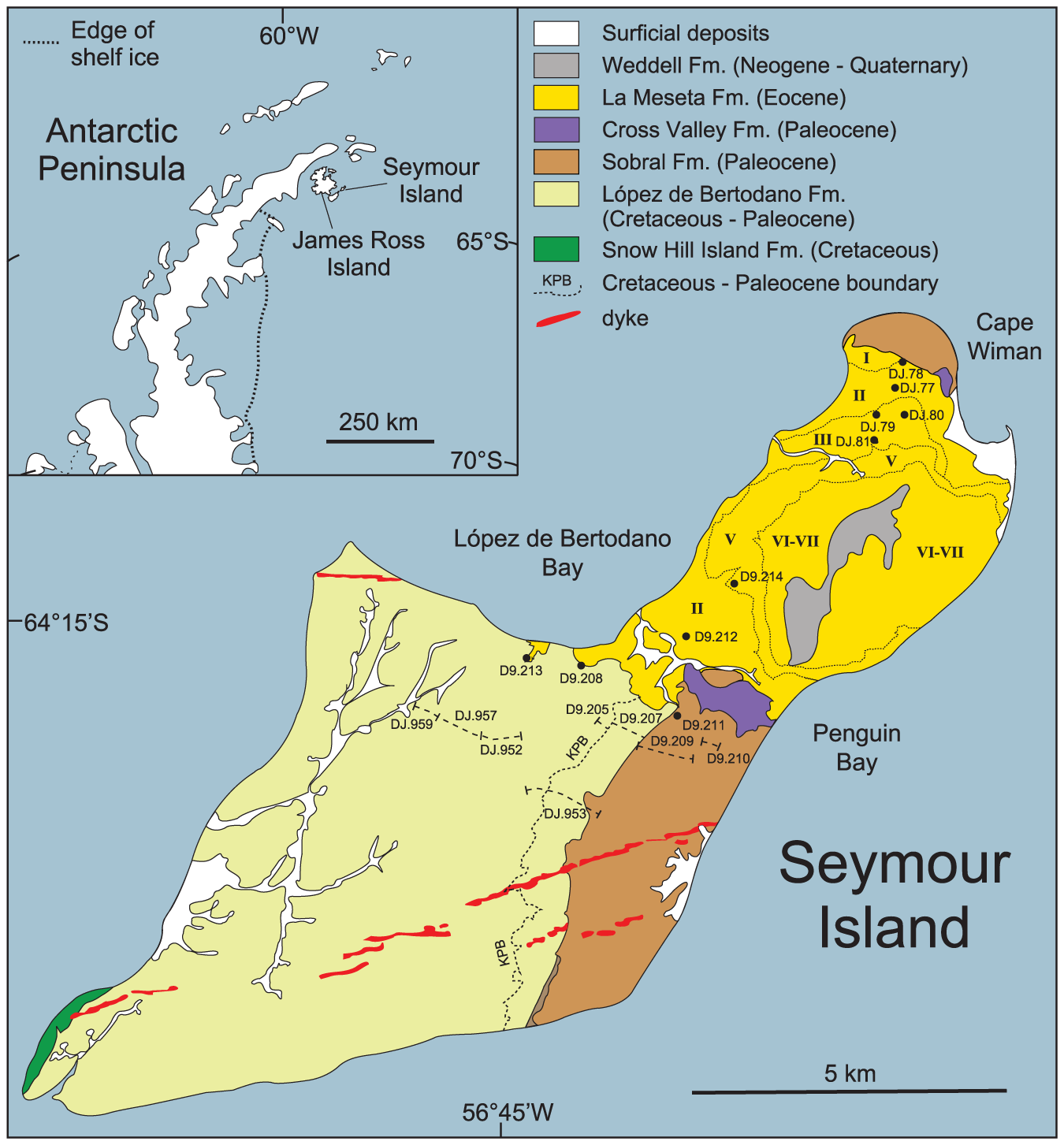
Geologic map of Seymour Island, Antarctica with the López de Bertodano Formation in light green

The fossil egg is visibly collapsed and folded and is characterized by a thin eggshell with a layered structure that lacks a prismatic layer and distinct pores. The oofossil is similar to that of most extant lizards and snakes (Lepidosauria). The identity of the animal that laid the egg is unknown, but these preserved morphologies are consistent with the skeletal remains of mosasaurs found nearby. Phylogenetic analysis suggests that the egg belonged to an individual that was at least 7 metres (23 ft) long, hypothesized to be a giant marine reptile. The large egg with a relatively thin eggshell may indicate a reproductive investment linked with gigantism, and lepidosaurian viviparity, in which an egg is laid and hatches immediately. However, it is possible it was actually laid by a dinosaur.

== See also ==
- La Meseta Formation
- South Polar region of the Cretaceous
- Mussaurus
