= East Gondwana =

Continental cluster of Australia, Zealandia and Antarctica after Gondwana broke apart

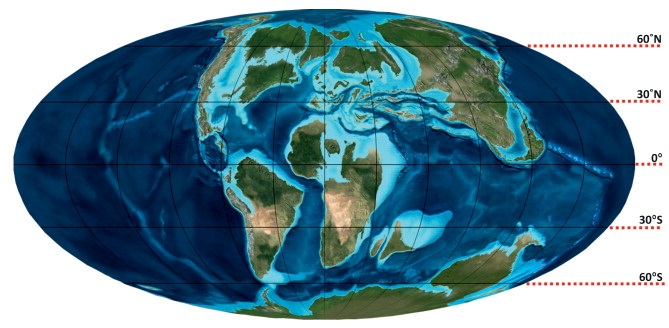
Paleogeography of the Late Cretaceous (90 Ma); the Antarctic Circle is at 60°S

The South Polar region of the Cretaceous comprised the continent of East Gondwana–modern day Australia, Zealandia, and Antarctica–a product of the break-up of Gondwana in the Cretaceous Period. The southern region, during this time, was much warmer than it is today, ranging from perhaps 4–8 °C (39–46 °F) in the latest Cretaceous Maastrichtian in what is now southeastern Australia. This prevented permanent ice sheets from developing and fostered polar forests, which were largely dominated by conifers, cycads, and ferns, and relied on a temperate climate and heavy rainfall. Major fossil-bearing geological formations that record this area are: the Santa Marta and Sobral Formations of Seymour Island off the Antarctic Peninsula; the Snow Hill Island, López de Bertodano, and the Hidden Lake Formations on James Ross Island also off the Antarctic Peninsula; and the Eumeralla and Wonthaggi Formations in Australia.

The South Polar region housed many endemic species, including several relict forms that had gone extinct elsewhere by the Cretaceous. Of the dinosaur assemblage, the most diverse were the small Elasmarian ornithopod dinosaurs. The South Polar region also was home to the last labyrinthodont amphibian, Koolasuchus. The isolation of Antarctica produced a distinct ecosystem of marine life called the Weddellian Province.

== Landscape ==
=== Geology ===
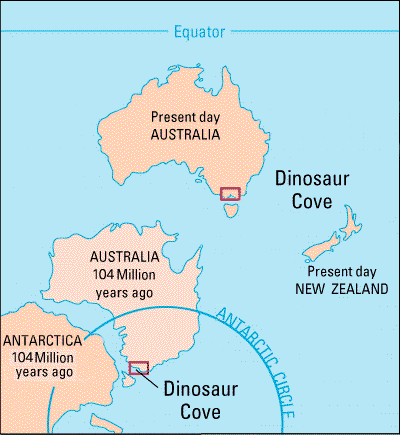
Dinosaur Cove has moved north over the last hundred million years

The Latady Basin in the southern Antarctic Peninsula–Palmer Land–contains volcanic rock, evidencing a large magmatic event in the Middle Cretaceous referred to as the Palmer Land event. This area has yielded an array of both macro- and micro- plant and mollusk fossils representative of the Early Cretaceous, as well as the Middle to Late Jurassic. The area that is now the Antarctic Peninsula, throughout the Mesozoic, was subducting the proto-Pacific plate, causing volcanic activity.

An important fossil-bearing formation is the Santa Marta Formation at James Ross Island off the Antarctic Peninsula, one of the most significant formations of the Southern Hemisphere, representing a high diversity terrestrial flora and fauna of the Late Cretaceous polar region. Seymour Island is similar in this respect, the area of discovery for vertebrate and invertebrate creatures–such as plesiosaurs–of the Late Cretaceous, extending into the Eocene. Other Cretaceous fossil-bearing formations in Antarctica are the Snow Hill Island Formation, the López de Bertodano Formation, and the Hidden Lake Formation, also on James Ross Island.

The Eumeralla Formation of Dinosaur Cove and the Wonthaggi Formation in Victoria, Australia, contain a number of dinosaur fossils and tracks from the Early Cretaceous. The Tahora Formation represents the reptile assemblage of Cretaceous New Zealand.

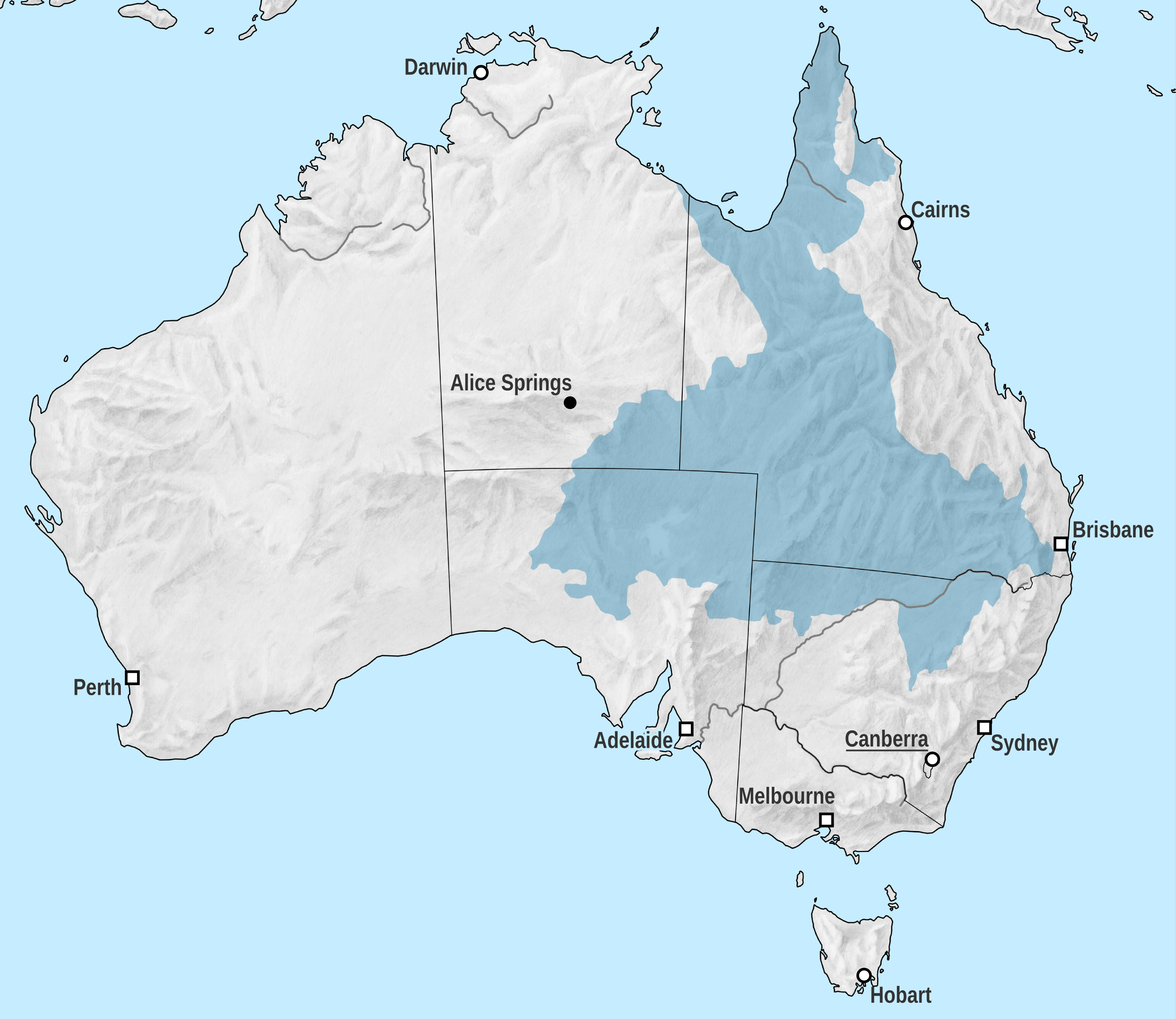
The Great Artesian Basin is a remnant of the inland Eromanga Sea

The Eromanga Sea was an inland sea across what would be Australia that formed in the Early Cretaceous. The sea reached the Eromanga Basin from the north via the Carpentarian Basin. The southern end of the sea comprised lagoons and rivers, and to the east in Surat Basin a bay. When India drifted away from Australia in the Early Cretaceous, the Perth Basin also filled with seawater. The area that would be the Coral Sea was a rift valley. As Australia and Antarctica drifted apart throughout the Cretaceous, a sea formed in between them.

=== Vegetation ===
The Cretaceous is characterized by warm global temperatures caused by the high amounts of carbon dioxide and possibly methane greenhouse gases in the atmosphere. This caused a lack of permanent ice coverage in the polar regions, though the carbon dioxide level dropped between 115 and 66 million years ago (mya), possibly allowing some permanent ice cover. It is possible that, throughout the Cretaceous, several small ice sheets developed. Increased tectonic activity, causing more geothermal heat, may have prevented glaciation and increased global temperatures. Temperatures may have been up to 15 °C (27 °F) warmer than they are in the modern age.

==== Jurassic ====
The landscape of the Middle Jurassic polar region has been reconstructed from the remains of forests exposed in New Zealand, which were between 70 and 80°S during the Jurassic. The vegetation was largely made up of conifers, cycads, and other gymnosperms, as well as ferns; on the forest floor grew lycopods, bryophytes, fungi, and algae. It had a temperate climate with heavy rainfall.

==== Early Cretaceous ====
In the Early Cretaceous, East Gondwana (Australia, Antarctica and Zealandia) had started to split away from South America, and India and Madagascar also began to separate at around the same time. The tropical zone may have extended, during the Cretaceous, to 32°S, allowing year-round tree growth in the Antarctic in polar forests. The discovery of several mature evergreen and deciduous trees indicate a warm-to-cool temperature with moderate seasons lacking widespread freezing, at least between the latitudes 70 and 85°S. However, it is also possible that the plant life may only be representative of the warm summer months. Much of what is known of the plant life of East Gondwana during the Cretaceous consists of pollen remains and leaf compressions from the northern Antarctic Peninsula. Depending on the latitude, the polar winters may have lasted from six weeks to four and a half months.

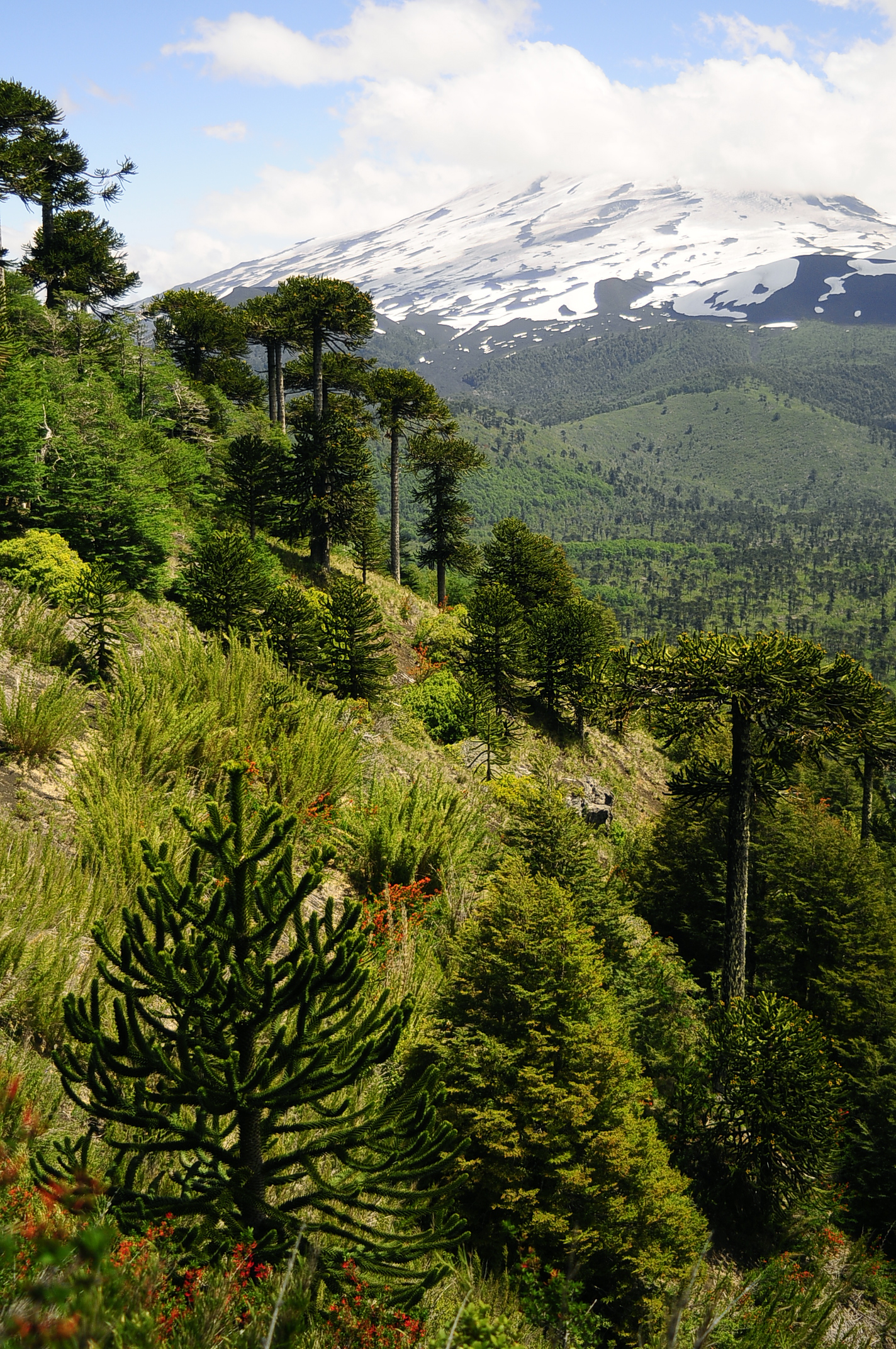
East Gondwana may have been similar to present day South American temperate forests (above).

However, rocks from the Early Cretaceous Wonthaggi Formation in southeastern Australia evidence seasonally frozen ground. Its geographical positioning in the Early Cretaceous at around 78°S indicates this area experienced one to three months of darkness in winters, and this area is representative of a glacial-fed floodplain. Evidence of Early Cretaceous glaciation and cold climates was discovered in sediments in the Eromanga Basin in modern-day central Australia, or 60 to 80°S in the Early Cretaceous. This basin was a large inland sea in the Cretaceous. Nonetheless, similar formations could have been created by simply debris flow, and so it is possible that glaciation did not ever occur there. The total polar ice coverage during the Mesozoic may have been a third of the size as it is in modern times, though cold snaps of subfreezing temperatures possibly occurred throughout the Early Cretaceous.

==== Late Cretaceous ====
The canopy of the polar forests around present-day Alexander Island, which was around 75°S in the Middle Cretaceous, were predominantly evergreen, and likely most South Polar forests were as well, and comprised mainly araucarian and podocarp conifers. It is thought that these trees remained dormant throughout the polar winters until summers under the midnight sun.

Evidence of flowering plants dating to around 80 Ma in the Late Cretaceous suggests the existence of temperate forests–similar to those in present-day Australia, New Zealand, and southern South America. Some flower remains were discovered near 60°S, and it is possible at such a low latitude that this area was subject to polar winters and seasonal weather, though the flowers suggest an annual temperature range of 8–15 °C (46–59 °F) and a rainy climate.

Pollen remains from southeastern Australia are identical to living plant species of Australia: conifers, flowering plants that inhabit areas with high rainfall and a Mediterranean climate, and sclerophyllous scrublands, indicating a unique landscape of rainforest and open bushland. Indicated by the size of the tree rings on fossil trees, the Antarctic polar forests featured a cooling trend throughout the Maastrichtian age 72 to 66 mya, from a mean annual temperature of 7 °C (45 °F) to a more seasonally extreme 4–8 °C (39–46 °F). These plants likely survived the Cretaceous–Paleogene extinction event, which killed off most life 66 Ma, on the volcanic Antarctic Peninsula; plant fossils dating to 60 Ma in the Paleocene from Seymour Island off this peninsula are recognized as being the ancestors of temperate plants inhabiting modern-day Australia and South America.

The Late Cretaceous (Campanian) Zamek and Half Three Point Formations of King George Island were located at 60°S and display a rich assemblage of fossil flora, such as Podocarpus; Araucaria; the leptosporangiate ferns Cladophlebis and Clavifera; and a variety of Magnoliopsida flowering plants, Dicotylophyllum, Myrciophyllum santacruzensis, Nothofagus, Sterculiaephyllum australis, Monimiophyllum, and so forth. The Sobral Formation of Seymour Island spanning the Cretaceous–Paleogene boundary at a paleolatitude of 63°S provided a new genus of fossil flower in the family Cunoniaceae, Eucryphiaceoxylon eucryphioides.

== Ecology ==
Much as in Australia today, East Gondwana played host to many endemic animals, which included many relict species of families that had gone extinct in the rest of the Cretaceous world. It is possible the polar regions of the Late Cretaceous had been inhabited by groups of plants and animals whose ancestry can be traced back to the Ordovician. The gradual isolation of Antarctica in the Late Cretaceous created a distinct group of aquatic creatures called the Weddellian Province.

=== Dinosaurs ===
==== Birds ====
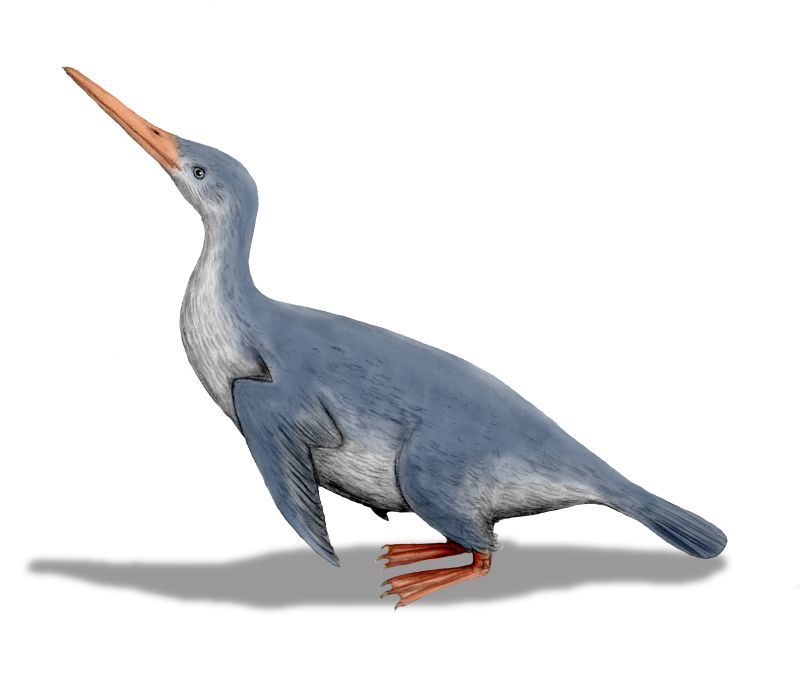
Early penguins (Waimanu above) may have existed in the Late Cretaceous.

The remains of the ancestor of modern birds, the Neornithes, are uncommon in the Mesozoic, with a large radiation occurring in the Neogene of Antarctica. However, the discovery of the Late Cretaceous Vegavis, a goose-like bird, on Vega Island indicates that the major modern bird groups were already common in the Cretaceous. A femur belonging to an unidentified seriema-like bird was also discovered on Vega Island. Bird footprints were preserved in Dinosaur Cove, and, being larger than most Cretaceous bird species, indicate an abundance of larger enantiornithe or ornithurine birds during the Early Cretaceous.

Two diving birds, possible primitive divers, were discovered in Late Cretaceous Chile and Antarctica: Neogaeornis and Polarornis. Polarornis may have been capable of both diving and flight. The earliest penguins, Crossvallia and Waimanu, are known from 61–62 Ma in the Paleocene, however molecular data suggests penguins first evolved in the Late Cretaceous. Given that these penguins were dated so close to the Cretaceous–Paleogene extinction event, the group either evolved before the event or very rapidly afterwards.

==== Non-avian ====
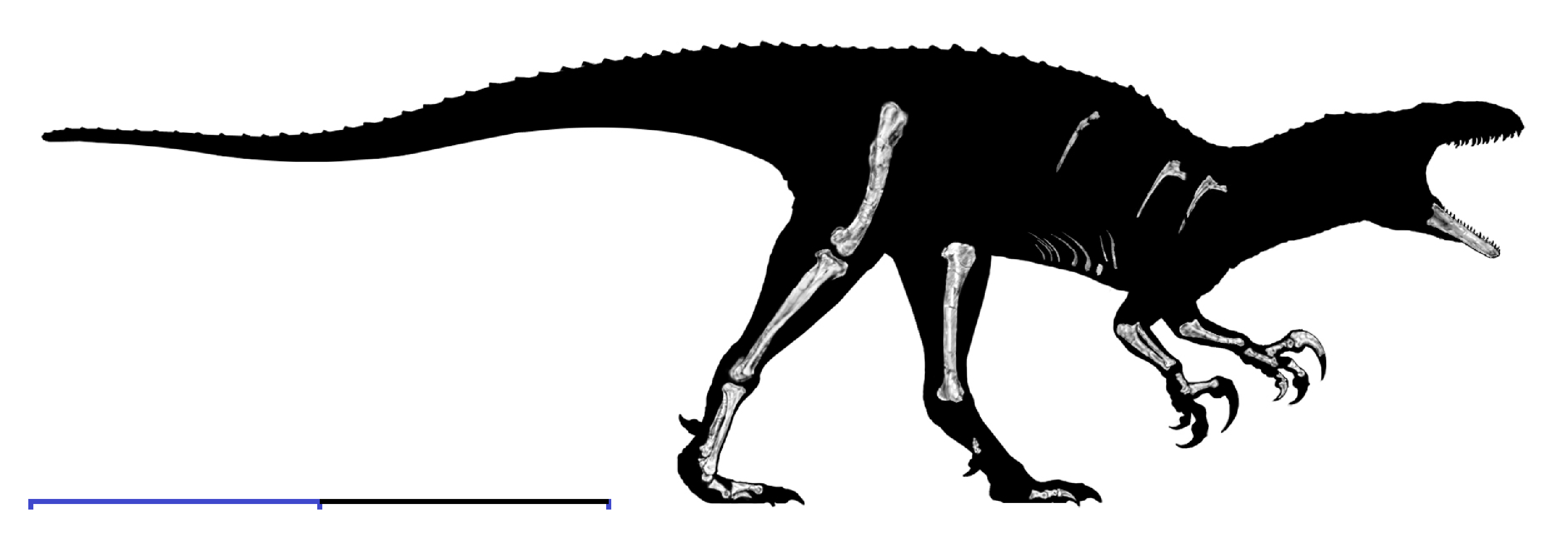
Australovenator is the most complete theropod found in Australia.

Dinosaur fossils are rare from the South Polar region, and major fossil-bearing locations are the James Ross Island group; Beardmore glacier in Antarctica; Roma, Queensland; Mangahouanga stream in New Zealand; and Dinosaur Cove in Victoria, Australia. The dinosaur remains of this region, such as those found in Victoria, consist only fragmentary pieces, making identification controversial. For example, disputed identifications include an allosaurid, which is more likely to be a Megaraptoran, the ceratopsian Serendipaceratops, which was likely to have been an ankylosaur, and the difficult-to-classify theropod Timimus have consequently been made.

The supercontinent Pangaea of the Jurassic allowed major dinosaur clades to achieve a global distribution before breaking up, and several closely related cognates existed between South Polar forms and forms found elsewhere despite separation by the Tethys Ocean. However, dinosaur groups that achieved pan-Gondwanan distribution over the course of the Cretaceous would have had to have used the land bridge connecting Australia to South America via Antarctica in the South Polar region. The Cretaceous South Polar Kunbarrasaurus is identified as being part of a unique lineage of Gondwanan ankylosaurs, which suggests homogeneity in the Gondwanan fauna. The Dromaeosauridae are known from Antarctica, and represent a relict population from a previously world-wide distribution. Despite these apparent cross-continental migrations, it is unlikely that South Polar dinosaurs migrated out of the polar forests during the winter, as they were either too massive–such as ankylosaurs–or too small–such as troodontids–to travel long distances, and a large sea between East Gondwana and other continents impeded any such migrations in the Late Cretaceous. It is possible, to cope with the winter conditions, some dinosaurs hibernated, such as the theropod Timimus.

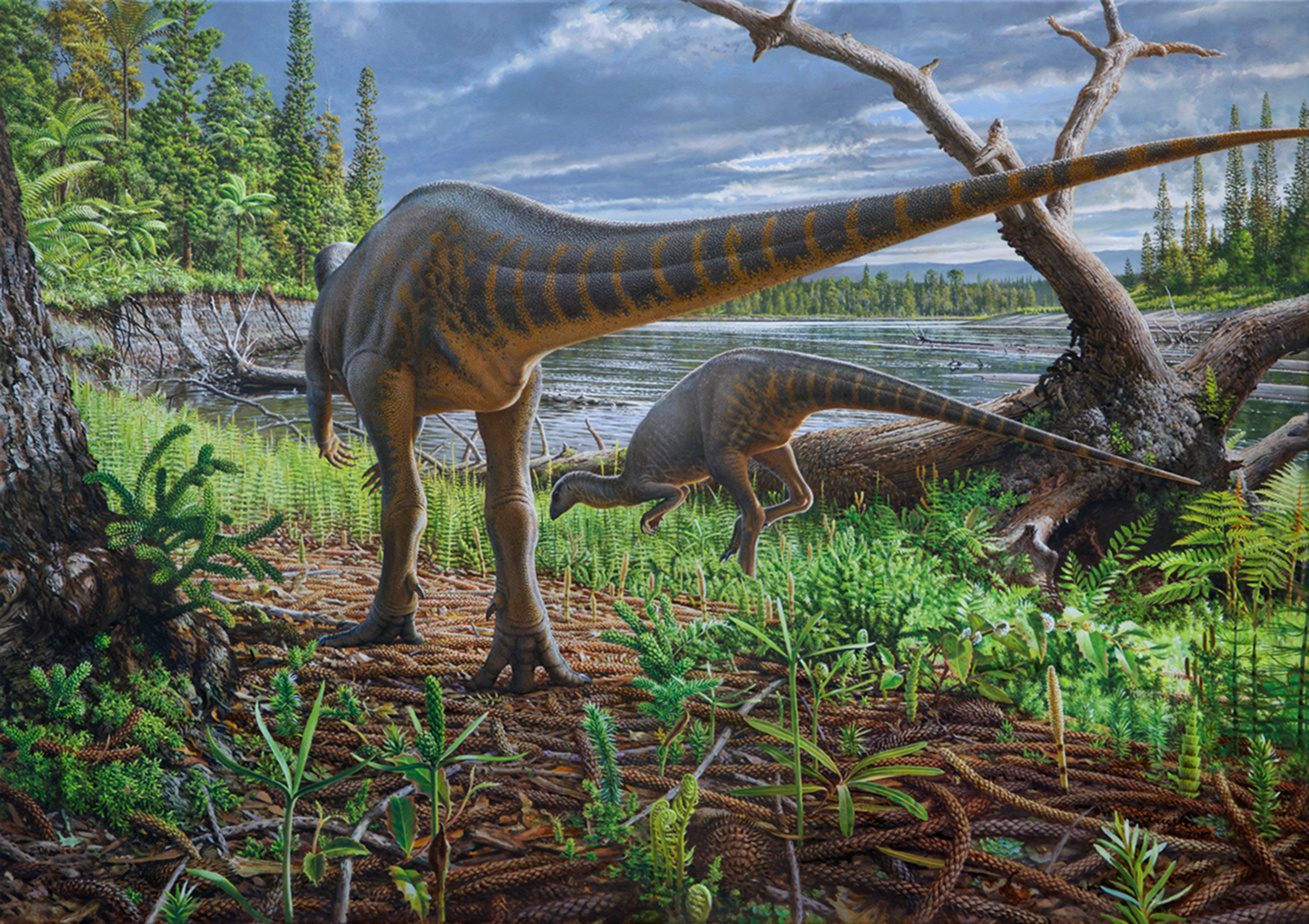
Illustration of the hypsilophodont-like Diluvicursor

The most common and diverse group found so far are the Elasmarinan ornithopods, making up half of the dinosaur taxa found in southeastern Australia, which is unseen in more tropical regions, perhaps indicating some kind of advantage over other dinosaurs in the poles. Being small with grinding dentition, they likely fed on low-lying vegetation such as lycopods and podocarp seed pods. Leaellynasaura had large eye sockets, larger than similar dinosaurs from warmer regions, and may have had acute night vision, suggesting that Leaellynasaura, and perhaps other Elasmarian dinosaurs, lived in the polar areas for year-round or most of the year, including polar winters. Bone growth was continuous throughout its life, indicating it did not hibernate, being possible by perhaps being endothermic or poikilothermic, or by digging burrows. However, it is possible that the large eyes are merely due to ontogeny, that is, relatively large eye-sockets may have been a feature only seen in juveniles, since there is only one specimen known.

Though remains are scant and, consequently, taxonomic descriptions can be dubious, the Victorian theropod remains have been assigned to seven different clades: Ceratosauria, Megaraptora, Tyrannosauroidea, and Maniraptora. Unlike the other Gondwanan continents whose apex predators where abelisaurids and carcharodontosaurids, the discovery of Australovenator, Rapator and an unnamed species in Australia suggests the megaraptorans were the top predators of East Gondwana. The tail vertebrae of an unknown theropod, dubbed "Joan Wiffen's theropod", were discovered in the Late Jurassic/Early Cretaceous rocks of New Zealand.

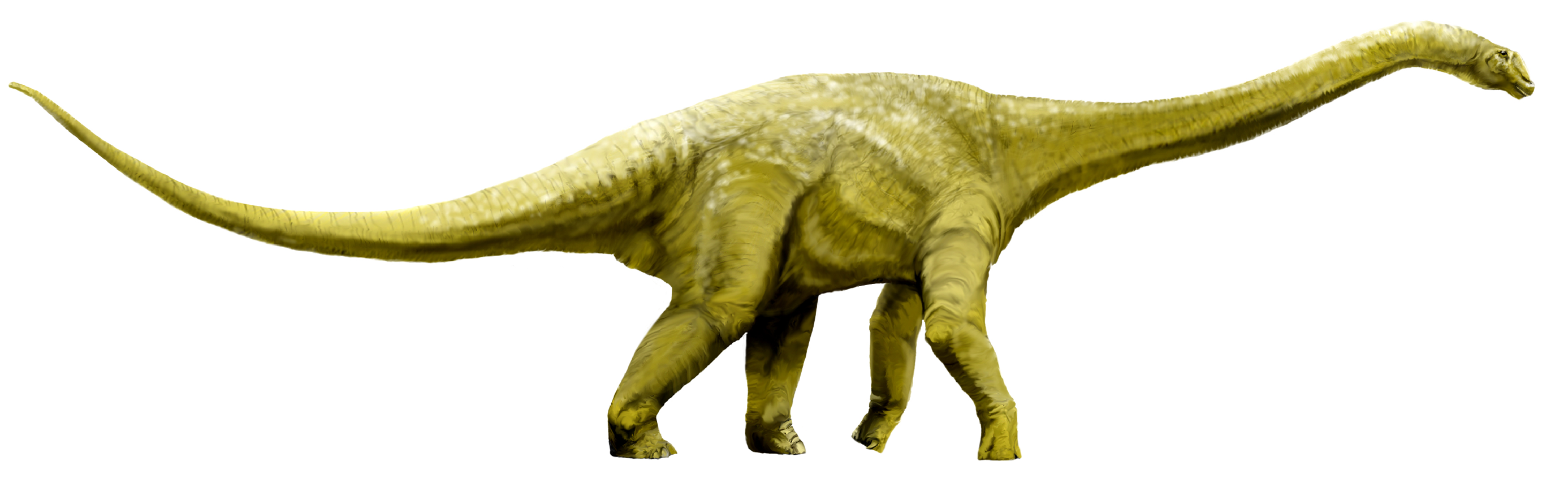
Wintonotitan likely inhabited the South Polar region.

Four titanosaurs–Australotitan, Savannasaurus, Diamantinasaurus, and Wintonotitan–discovered in the Winton Formation make up the sauropod assemblage of Cretaceous Australia, though, these creatures probably avoided the polar regions as their remains are completely absent in Southeast Australia which was within the South Polar region in the Cretaceous. However, it is likely that at least the titanosaurs migrated to Australia from South America, which would have required them to pass through Antarctica, since titanosaurs evolved in the Cretaceous after the break-up of Pangaea. It is possible the Bonarelli Event in the Middle Cretaceous may have made Antarctica warmer and therefore more hospitable to sauropods. These dinosaurs probably fed on the fleshy seeds of podocarp and yew trees, as well as the commonplace forked ferns of the time.

==== Paleocene ====
After an asteroid impact, the ensuing impact winter is thought to have killed off the dinosaurs along with much of Mesozoic life in the Cretaceous–Paleogene extinction event. However, the lack of an abrupt extinction horizon in Antarctic or Australian sediments for plant and bivalve fossils during this time period indicates a less powerful impact in the South Polar region. Given that the dinosaurs and other fauna of the polar regions of the Cretaceous were well adapted for living in long periods of dark and cold weather, it has been postulated that this community might have survived the event.

=== Rivers and lakes ===
The last temnospondyls–a group of giant amphibians which mainly died out after the Triassic–inhabited the South Polar region into the Early Cretaceous. Koolasuchus, perhaps the last of the temnospondyls, is thought to have survived in regions where it was too cold for their competitors, the neosuchians–a group of reptiles containing modern crocodilians–which are inactive in water below 10 °C (50 °F), to survive. Though neosuchians are known from Cretaceous Australia, it is thought that they stayed away from the polar region, arriving to Australia over-seas rather than over-land.

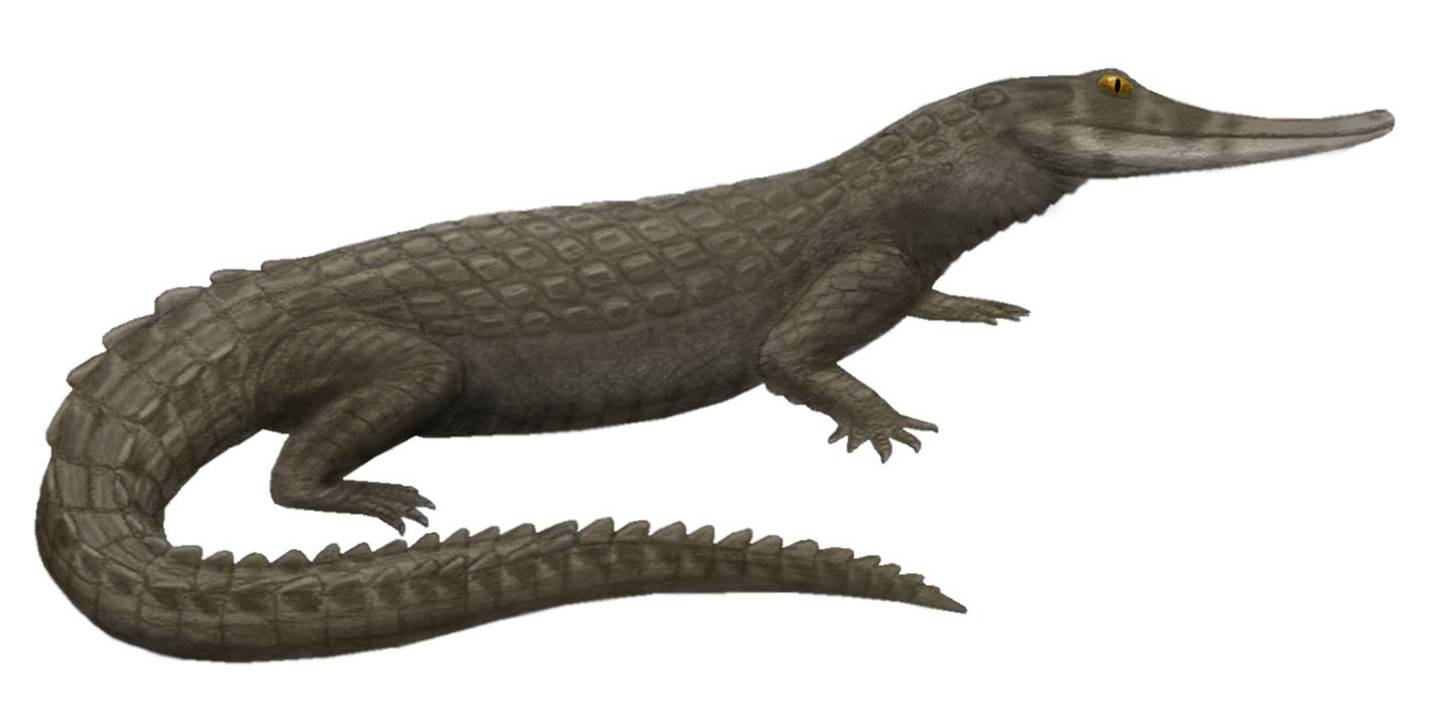
Isisfordia was a neosuchian that lived in the inland Eromanga Sea of the Early Cretaceous.

It is likely the temnospondyls inhabited the freshwater systems of polar Australia until the Bonarelli Event in the Middle Cretaceous around 100 mya increased temperatures and allowed neosuchians to inhabit Antarctica. These neosuchians, at an adult size of no more than 2.5 metres (8.2 ft) in length, likely led to the extinction of the temnospondyls in tandem with more-developed ray-finned fish which perhaps targeted their larvae. The migration of neosuchians into the region suggests that average winter temperatures were greater than 5.5 °C (41.9 °F), with an average annual temperature of more than 14.2 °C (57.6 °F). However, polar neosuchians are only known from an almost complete skeleton of Isisfordia, and other neosuchian remains are of undetermined species.

Plesiosaurs inhabited freshwater river and estuary systems, given the locations of their remains, probably colonizing Australia in the Early to Middle Jurassic. Their remains, mainly teeth, have been documented from southeastern Australia deriving from the Late Cretaceous, though they were never described as the remains are too sparse to do so. The teeth share some affinity with pliosaurs, notably the rhomaleosaurids and Leptocleidus, which died out in the Early Cretaceous, indicating the polar freshwater systems may have been a refuge for the pliosaurs of the Cretaceous. In contrast to modern marine reptiles, these South Polar plesiosaurs probably had a better tolerance of colder waters.

=== Oceans ===
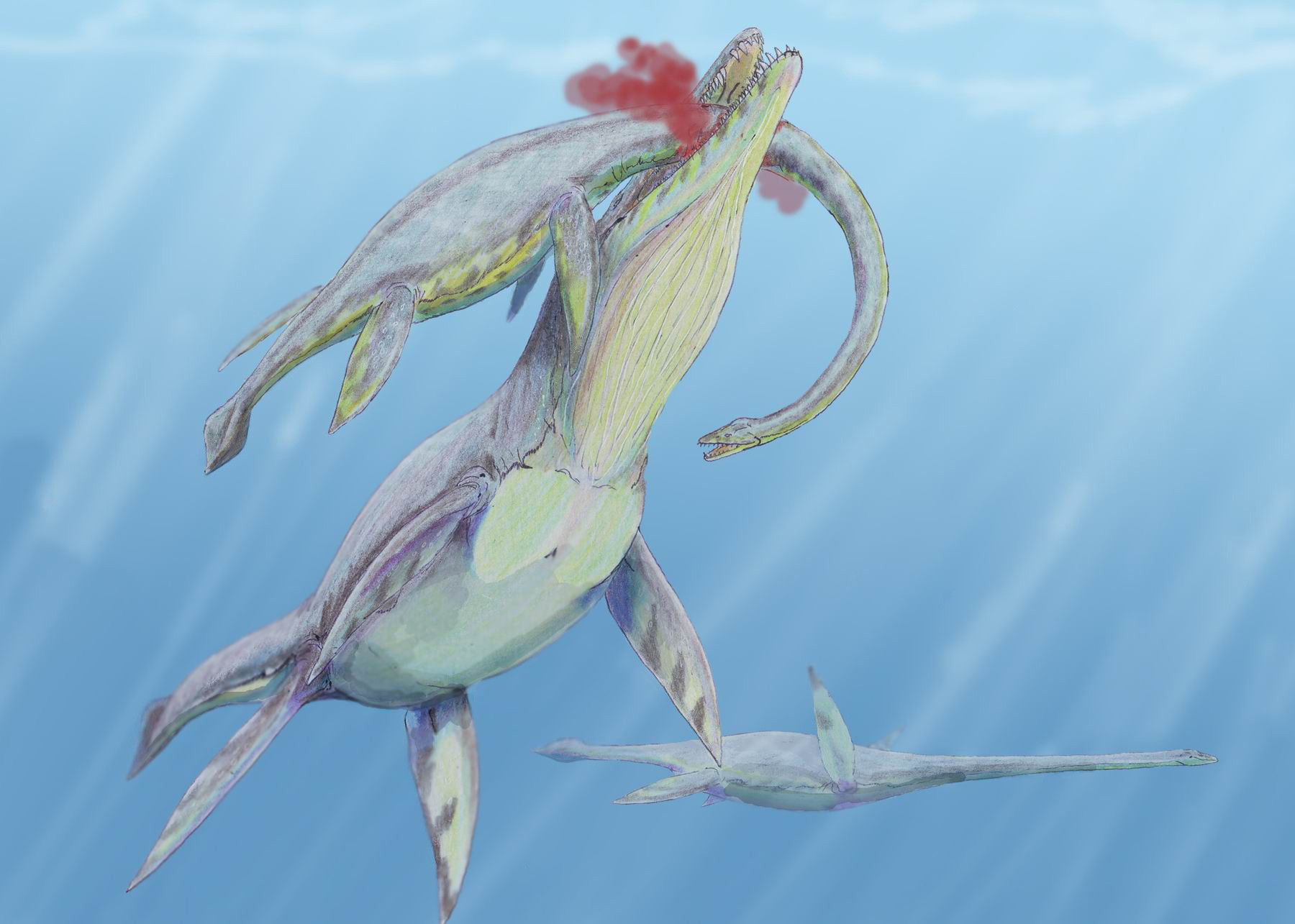
The Australian Woolungasaurus being attacked by a Kronosaurus

Early to Middle Cretaceous marine reptile remains of South Australia include five families of plesiosaurs–Cryptoclididae, Elasmosauridae, Polycotylidae, Rhomaleosauridae, and Pliosauridae–and the ichthyosaur family Ophthalmosauridae. The discovery of several juvenile plesiosaur remains suggest they used the nutrient-rich waters of the coast as sheltered calving grounds, the cold deterring predators such as sharks. Most of the plesiosaurs discovered had a cosmopolitan distribution, however endemic forms existed there such as Opallionectes and a possible new species of cryptoclidid. A dubious species of elasmosaurid Woolungasaurus, was named in 1928, one of the earliest description of an Australian marine reptile. Several mollusc, gastropod, ammonite, bony fish, chimaerid, and squid-like belemnite remains have been recovered as well. The coastal area may have experienced winter freezing, and these reptiles, in response, may have migrated north during the winter, had a more active metabolism than tropical reptiles, have hibernated in freshwater areas much like the modern day American alligator (Alligator mississippiensis), or have been endothermic similar to modern day leatherback sea turtles (Dermochelys coriacea). The lower number of plesiosaurs and higher number of ichthyosaurs and sea turtles in more northerly areas of Australia indicates a preference for colder areas in plesiosaurs.

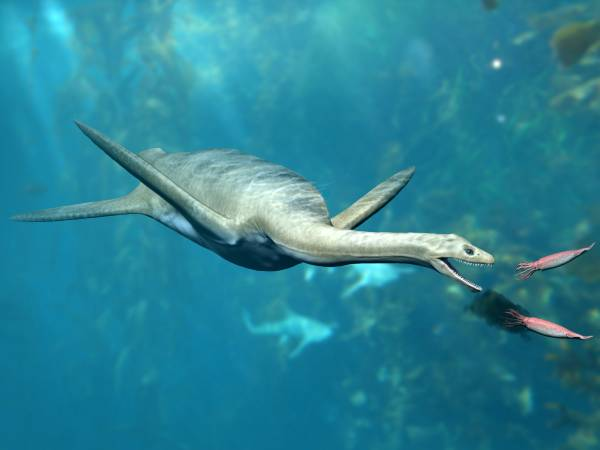
Restoration of the New Zealand Kaiwhekea

Several Late Cretaceous oceanic plesiosaurs and mosasaurs have been discovered in New Zealand and Antarctica, with some, such as Mauisaurus, being endemic, while others, such as Prognathodon, having a cosmopolitan distribution. Elasmosaurs and pliosaurs are known from one to three species from this area. The discovery of three cryptoclidids in the Southern Hemisphere–Morturneria from Antarctica, Aristonectes from South America, and Kaiwhekea from New Zealand–indicates a diversification of the family in the Late Cretaceous of this region and perhaps an increasing productivity of the early Southern Ocean.

=== Pterosaurs ===
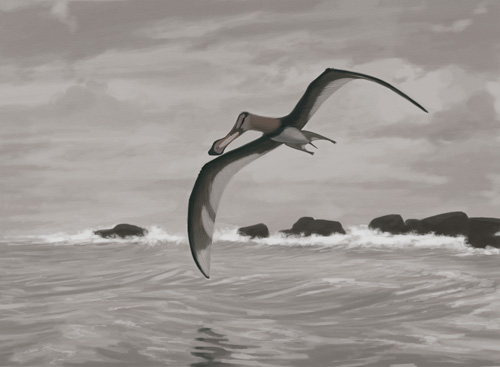
Pterosaurs similar to the Brazilian Anhanguera (above) inhabited the Eromanga Sea region

Two clades of pterosaurs are represented in Early Cretaceous Australia, Pteranodontoidea and Ctenochasmatoidea, remains mainly deriving from the Toolebuc Formation and areas of Queensland and New South Wales. It is thought that at least six pterosaur taxa existed in Cretaceous Australia, however, given the fragmentary nature of the remains, many fossils recovered originate from undetermined pterosaur. Fossils were found in shallow-water environments and lagoons, indicating a diet of fish and other aquatic life. The ctenochasmatids were the only archaeopterodactyloids to survive into the Cretaceous. The only pterosaur tooth remains discovered in Australia deriving from the Early Cretaceous belong to Mythunga and a possible Late Cretaceous anhanguerid. Mythunga is estimated to have had a 4.5-meter (15 ft) wingspan, much larger than any other archaeopterodactyloid discovered, though it is possible the pterosaur is more related to the Anhangueridae or Ornithocheiridae. However, pterosaur remains existing in what were the non-polar regions of Australia, given their ability to migrate by air, perhaps did not need to cross a land bridge through the polar regions to arrive there, meaning they did not ever inhabit the South Polar region.

Of the Late Cretaceous pterosaurs, only the remains belonging to the family Azhdarchidae–found in the Carnarvon and Perth basins in Western Australia–were assigned to a taxon. A possible representative of Ornithocheiridae was found in Late Cretaceous Western Australia, though the family was previously thought to have gone extinct in the Early Cretaceous.

=== Mammals ===
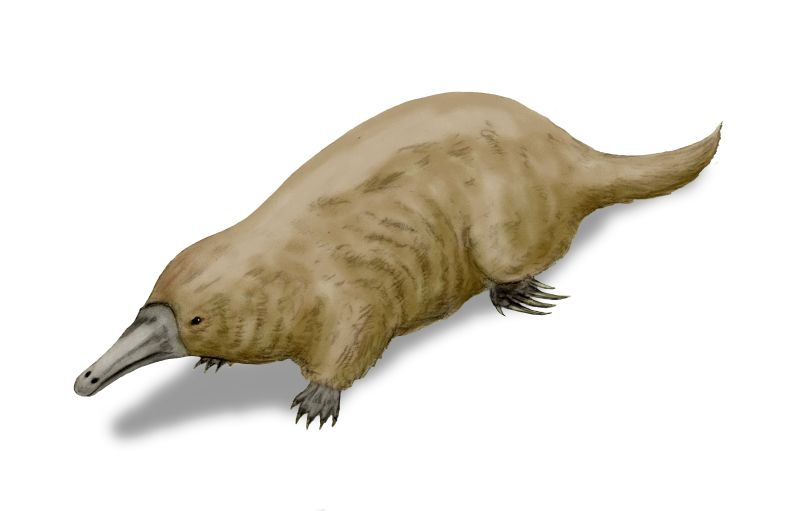
Restoration of Steropodon

Seven mammals have been discovered from Early Cretaceous Australia: an undescribed ornithorhynchid, Kryoryctes, Kollikodon, Ausktribosphenos, Bishops, Steropodon, and Corriebaatar; all of which were endemic to Australia during this time. It is likely mammals crossed the Antarctic land bridge between Australia and South America in the Early Cretaceous, and likely the ancestors of the endemic mammals of Australia arrived during the Jurassic across the supercontinent Pangaea.

=== Invertebrates ===
Several fossils of insects and crustaceans are known from South Polar Cretaceous sediments of New Zealand. The Late Cretaceous Mangaotanean Monro Conglomerate was situated at 68°S and provided fossils of Helastia sp., and the crab Hemioon novozelandicum was found in the Swale Siltstone, located at 76°S during the late Albian. Several specimens of insects were also found in the Tupuangi Formation of the Chatham Islands at a latitude of 79°S during the Cenomanian to Turonian.

== See also ==
- Dinosaur Cove
- Dinosaur Dreaming
- Geology of Antarctica, including paleontology
  - List of fossiliferous stratigraphic units in Antarctica
- List of Australian and Antarctic dinosaurs
- Gondwana Rainforests
- Polar forests of the Cretaceous
- "Spirits of the Ice Forest", episode 5 of Walking with Dinosaurs
