= Melanella seymourensis =

Scientific classification
- Kingdom: Animalia
- Phylum: Mollusca
- Class: Gastropoda
- Subclass: Caenogastropoda
- Order: Littorinimorpha
- Family: Eulimidae
- Genus: Melanella
- Species: †M. seymourensis

Binomial name
- †Melanella seymourensis Stilwell, Zinsmeister & Oleinik, 2004

Species of gastropod

Melanella seymourensis is an extinct species of sea snail, a marine gastropod mollusk in the family Eulimidae. The species is one of a number within the genus Melanella.

== Distribution ==
Fossils of this bathyal species were found in Paleocene strata on Seymour Island, Antarctica.
