= López de Bertodano Formation =

Geologic formation in Antarctica

- Stratigraphic range: Maastrichtian-Danian; ~70–65.5 Ma
- Type: Geological formation
- Unit of: Marambio & Seymour Island Groups
- Sub-units: Cape Lamb & Lower Sandwich Bluff Members
- Underlies: Sobral Fm., La Meseta Fm.
- Overlies: Snow Hill Island Formation

Lithology
- Primary: Siltstone, mudstone
- Other: Sandstone with concretions

Location
- Coordinates: 64.0°S 57.4°W
- Approximate paleocoordinates: 61.9°S 68.1°W
- Region: Seymour Island, James Ross Island group, Vega Island
- Country: Antarctica

Type section
- Named for: López de Bertodano Bay
- López de Bertodano Formation (Antarctica)

The López de Bertodano Formation is a geological formation in the James Ross archipelago of the Antarctic Peninsula. The strata date from the end of the Late Cretaceous (upper-lower Maastrichtian stage) to the Danian stage of the lower Paleocene, from about 70 to 65.5 million years ago, straddling the Cretaceous-Paleogene boundary.

== Cretaceous-Paleogene boundary ==
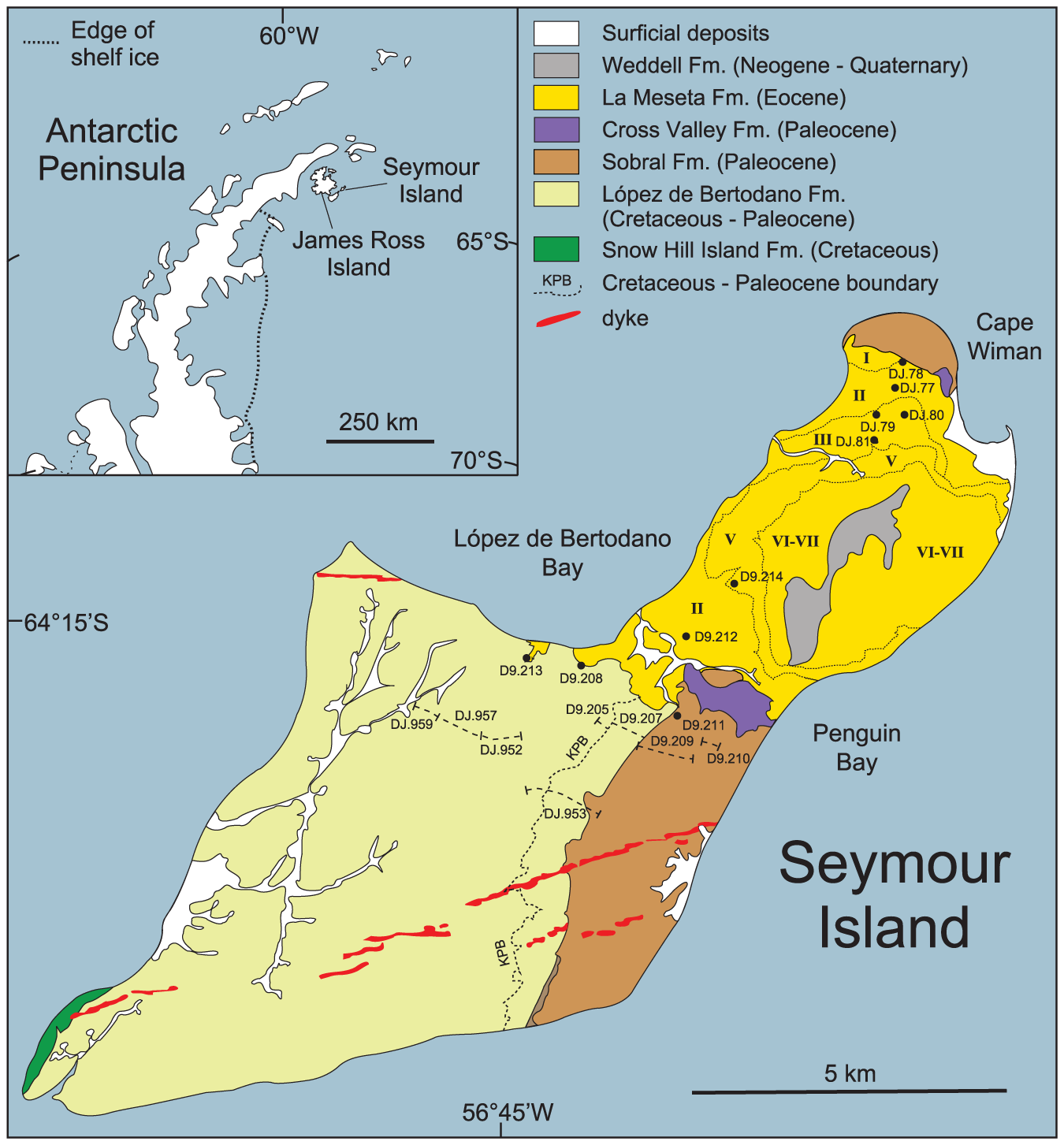
Geologic map of Seymour Island, Antarctica with the López de Bertodano Formation in light green, the locations where the Cretaceous–Paleogene boundary is exposed are indicated

The Cretaceous–Paleogene boundary (K–Pg) crops out on Seymour Island in the upper levels of the López de Bertodano Formation. A small (but significant) iridium anomaly occurs at the boundary on Seymour Island, as at lower latitudes, thought to be fallout from the Chicxulub impactor in the Gulf of Mexico. Directly above the boundary a layer of disarticulated fish fossils occurs, victims of a disturbed ecosystem immediately following the impact event. Multiple reports have described evidence for climatic changes in Antarctica prior to the mass extinction, but the extent to which these affected marine biodiversity is debated. Based on extensive marine fossil collections from Seymour Island, recent work has confirmed that a single and severe mass extinction event occurred at this time in Antarctica just as at lower latitudes.

== Climate ==
During the Maastrichtian, Seymour Island was located just outside the Antarctic polar circle at around ~64°S latitude. Studies on oxygen-18 isotopes found in belemnites and benthic foraminifera have calculated intermediate-deep-shelf water temperatures at an average of 6 °C (43 °F). This paper also suggested annual temperature variability of 5 °C (41 °F) based on Belemnite growth bands, perhaps in agreement with another study which has suggested that sea surface temperatures may have possibly dropped below freezing and formed sea ice at times. Alternatively, a study using data acquired from ancient bacterial membrane lipids yielded a slightly warmer temperature of 12 ± 5 °C (54 ± 9 °F); further research in other high latitude localities have suggested these methods may be biased towards summer temperatures. More recently a paper has used oxygen-18 isotopes from bony fish fossils to estimate an average water temperature of 6.8 °C (44.2 °F), overall supporting a subpolar climate regime perhaps similar to the modern Magallanes Region.

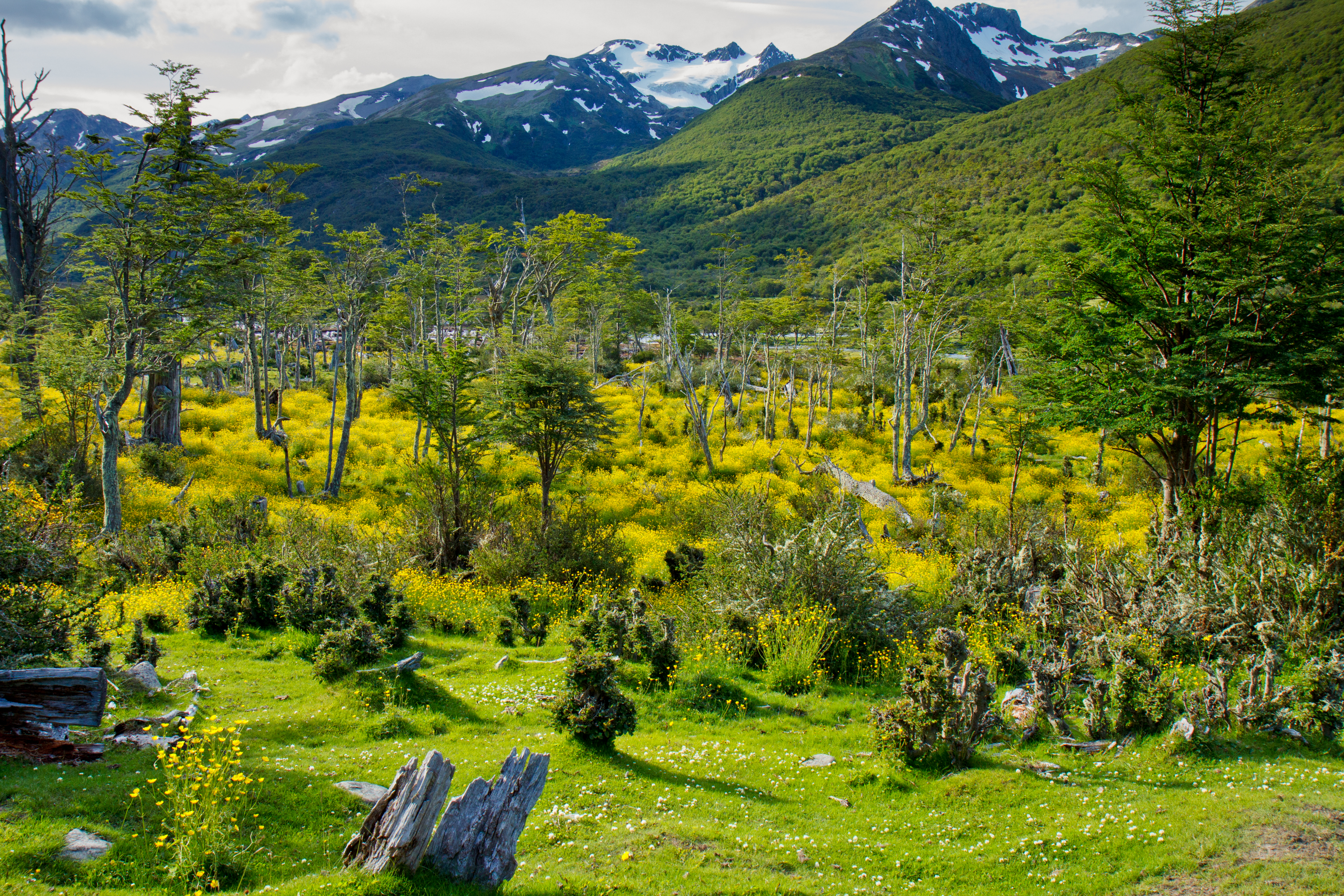
Southern Chilean forests are a modern analogue for Maastrichtian Antarctica

== Fossil content ==
The López de Bertodano Formation has provided many fossils of flora, dinosaurs and birds. Also the first fossil egg from Antarctica, Antarcticoolithus, was found in the formation.

Dinosaur remains are among the fossils that have been recovered from the formation and include at least two and probably as much as six lineages of indisputably modern birds: one related to waterfowl, a primitive shorebird or related form, 1 to 2 species of possible loons, a large and possibly flightless bird belonging to a lineage extinct today as well as a partial skull that might belong to either of the smaller species or represent yet another one. The formation also contains a rich fossil invertebrate fauna, including bivalves, gastropods, and cephalopods (ammonites and nautiloids).

The fish assemblage of the López de Bertodano Formation was dominated by Enchodus and ichthyodectiformes, accounting for 21.95% and 45.6% of local fish diversity respectively. Of the remaining percentages, sand sharks made up 10.5%, the cow shark Notidanodon 6.8%, chimaeras 3.9%, saw sharks 2.7%, various other teleost fish 2.4%, and the remaining 6% were shared between other sharks like Paraorthacodus, frilled sharks, Protosqualus, and Cretalamna.

=== Vertebrates ===
==== Dinosaurs ====
Color key: Taxon / Reclassified taxon / Taxon falsely reported as present / Dubious taxon or junior synonym / Ichnotaxon / Ootaxon / Morphotaxon	Notes; Uncertain or tentative taxa are in small text; ~~crossed out~~ taxa are discredited.

===== Ornithischians =====
Ornithischians recorded from López de Bertodano Formation
Genus	Species	Member/location	Material	Description	Image
Elasmaria	Indeterminate	Sandwich Bluff Member	CM 93790, right prox. Metatarsal II; Rt. Prox. Metatarsal IV; left. Prox. Fibula		
Elasmaria	Indeterminate	Sandwich Bluff Member	MLP 98-I-10-70, pedal ungual	Also considered Ornithischia indet.	
Hadrosauridae	Indeterminate	Sandwich Bluff, Vega Island	Isolated cheek tooth, MLP 98-I-10-1.	The first hadrosaur remains known from Antarctica	
Hadrosauridae	Indeterminate	Seymour Island	MLP 96-1-6-2, Distal end of metatarsal	The first hadrosaur remains known from Antarctica	
Parankylosauria	Indeterminate	Sandwich Bluff Member	Right pedal ungual IV, CM93791, and osteoderm		

===== Saurischians =====
Saurischians recorded from López de Bertodano Formation
Genus	Species	Member/location	Material	Description	Image
Aves	Indeterminate	Lower Sandwich Bluff	AMNH FARB 30898, incomplete coracoid		
Charadriiform	Indeterminate	Cape Lamb	Partial skeleton; incomplete tarsometatarsus (MLP 98-I-10-25)	Reminiscent of a thick-knee	Modern thick-knee, with convergent features
Conflicto	C. antarcticus	Seymour Island	MLP 07-III-1-1, a three-dimensionally preserved, partly complete skeleton	An anseriform	Skeletal reconstruction
Gaviiformes	Indeterminate	VEG IAA 2/98, Isla Vega	MLP 98-I-10-47, MLP 98-I-10-50, MLP 98-I-10-52, MLP 98-I-10-76: tarsometatarsus;MLP 98-I-10-59: diaphysis of left tibiotarsus; MLP 98-I-10-51: proximal end of left femur; MLP 98-I-10-48: distal end of left tibiotarsus; MLP 98-I-10-60 and MLP 98-I-10-61: distal end and partial corpus of pedal phalanges.	Very similar to that of Gavia immer	Modern Gavia immer (common loon), with convergent features
cf. Gaviiformes	Indeterminate	VEG IAA 2/98, Isla Vega	MLP 98-I-10-54, MLP 98-I-10-27: tarsometatarsus; MLP 98-I-10-53: distal end of left tibiotarsus; MLP 98-I-10-49 distal end of right tibiotarsus	Very similar to that of Gavia immer	Modern Gavia immer (common loon), with convergent features
Megaraptora	Indeterminate	Sandwich Bluff, Cape Lamb	SDSM 159537, maxilla	Has oblong and narrow tooth alveoli, seen in megaraptorans	
Megaraptora	Indeterminate	Sandwich Bluff, Cape Lamb	SDSM 9918, left maxillary	Has oblong and narrow tooth alveoli, seen in megaraptorans	
Ornithurae	Indeterminate	Cape Lamb, Vega Island	AMNH FARB 30913, distal tarsometatarsus		
Polarornis	P. gregorii	Seymour Island	Partial skull and skeleton, holotype	A possible vegaviid, or aequornithe	
Polarornis	P.? sp.	Sandwich Bluff, Cape Lamb	Partial skeleton including wing and hindlimbs	A possible vegaviid, or aequornithe	
Polarornis	cf. P. gregorii	Sandwich Bluff, Cape Lamb	MN 7833-V, distal portion of a tarsometatarsus	A possible vegaviid, or aequornithe	
Polarornis	P. sp.	IAA 10/13, Seymour Island	MLP 96-I-6-2, incomplete skeleton	A possible vegaviid, or aequornithe	
Pujatopouli	P. soberana	Seymour Island	MLP-PV 08-XI-30-44, cranial and associated postcranial material	An early aequornithe.	Holotype of Pujatopouli
Sauropoda?	Indeterminate	Tesore Hill	Footprints?	Potential sauropod footprints	
Theropoda	Indeterminate	Sandwich Bluff, Cape Lamb	S061-9917, Fragments		
Theropoda	Indeterminate	Tesore Hill	Footprints?	Potential theropod footprints	
Vegavis	V. iaai	Lower Sandwich Bluff	Holotype (MLP 93-I-3-1), partial skeleton; MACN-PV 19.748, partial skeleton	A foot-propelled diver neognath	Vegavis restoration
Vegavis	V. geitononesos	Molluscan Allomember, Marambio Island	MLP-PV 15-I-7-52. Skull lacking the upper beak	A foot-propelled diver neognath	Vegavis geitononesos
Vegavis	V. notopothousa	Lower Sandwich Bluff	AMNH FARB 30899. Partial skull	Previously referred to V. iaai.	
Vegavis	V. sp.	Plesiosaur Papoose, Cape Lamb	Isolated femur	Initially identified as a fossil of a member of Cariamae, but subsequently reinterpreted as a fossil of an unnamed large-bodied member of the genus Vegavis.	
Vegavis	cf. V. iaai	Sandwich Bluff, Cape Lamb	MN 7832-V, synsacrum		
Vegaviidae	Indeterminate	Seymour Island			

==== Elasmosaurs ====
Elasmosaurs recorded from López de Bertodano Formation
Genus	Species	Member/location	Material	Description	Image
Aristonectes	A. parvidens	Seymour Island	Partial postcranial skeleton (MLP 89-III-3-1)	A giant elasmosaur	
Aristonectes	A. sp	Sandwich Bluff, Cape Lamb	MLP 11-I-1-15, caudal vertebra	A giant elasmosaur	
Aristonectes	A. sp	Seymour Island	TTU.P.9219 (holotype skull and cervical vertebrae)	A giant elasmosaur	
Elasmosauridae	Indeterminate	SW corner, Seymour Island	MLP 82-I-28-1, an incomplete skeleton comprising 15 cervical, three pectorals, 21 dorsal, three sacral, and 22 caudal vertebrae, an almost complete left hind limb, some dorsal ribs, incomplete coracoids and fragments of the scapulae		
Elasmosauridae	Indeterminate	SW corner, Seymour Island	ZPAL R.8, pectoral, dorsal, and caudal vertebral centra, femur, tibia, and fragments of the humerus, scapula, and ischia		
Elasmosauridae	Indeterminate	Seymour Island	TTU P 9240; dorsal, sacral and caudal vertebrae, limbs and paddle fragments		
Elasmosauridae	Indeterminate	Seymour Island	SGO.PV.6523, postcranial remains of a single adult individual, including remains of 9 mid-to-posterior cervical vertebrae (6 of them preserving parts of their centra), the right scapula, several fragments of ribs and gastralia, and one phalanx.		
Elasmosauridae	Indeterminate	Seymour Island	TTU P 9238; part of cervicals, rib fragments, isolated paddles, and gastroliths		
Elasmosauridae	Indeterminate	Seymour Island	TTU P 9239; isolated vertebrae, limb bones, paddle elements, and ribs		
Elasmosauridae	Indeterminate	Seymour Island	IAA Pv 443, an incomplete skeleton comprising the mandibular symphysis and part of right and left mandibular rami, cervical and dorsal centra, an incomplete humerus, radius, ulna, ulnare, intermedium, radiale and distal carpal 1, 2 þ 3 and 4, other fragmentary postcranial bones and associated gastroliths		
Euelasmosaurida	Indeterminate	Sandwich Bluff, Cape Lamb	CM 93780; left and right pubes and ischia: MLP 15-I-7-8, left ilium and indeterminate fragments		
Marambionectes	M. molinai	Seymour Island	Partially articulated incomplete skeleton including cranial material, many vertebrae, ribs, an ilium, limb bones (right humerus and ulna, a femur), and gastroliths (IAA-Pv 752)	A weddellonectian elasmosaur	
Morturneria	M. seymourensis	Seymour Island	several cervical vertebrae, a right humerus, a nearly complete left forelimb missing the proximal end of the humerus, and a left femur (TTU P9217)	An elasmosaur	
Weddellonectia	Indeterminate	Sandwich Bluff, Cape Lamb	MLP 15-I-7-48, right humerus, ulna, ulnare, intermedium, distal carpal I, distal carpal II+III, pisiform, phalanges and one rib		
Weddellonectia	Indeterminate	Seymour Island	MLP 14-I-20-16, 12 cervical vertebrae, three pectoral vertebrae, 11 dorsal vertebrae, one sacral vertebra, 11 caudal vertebrae, right femur, tibia, fibula and mesopodial elements, fragments of pectoral and pelvic girdles and gastroliths		

==== Mosasaurs ====
Mosasaurs recorded from López de Bertodano Formation
Genus	Species	Member/location	Material	Description	Image
Antarcticoolithus	A. bradyi	Seymour Island.	A fossilized eggshell	Very large soft-shelled egg; considered likely from a mosasaur by its describers, though a dinosaur identity is possible	
Kaikaifilu	K. hervei	Seymour Island	Several incomplete parts of a skull, jawbone, 30 isolated teeth, and a partial left humerus (SGO.PV.6509)	A possible tylosaurine	
Liodon	L. sp.	Vega Island Sandwich Bluff	MLP 98-I-10-1 is a fragment of a maxilla; MLP 98-I-10-12/15/23 are teeth	A dubious genus of mosasaurine	
Liodon	L. sp.	Seymour Island	DJ.952.266, a tooth	A dubious genus of mosasaurine	
Mosasauridae	Indeterminate	Bahía Fósiles	MLP 80-I-1-1, a cervical vertebra; MLP 80-I-1-2, a mandibular fragment; MLP 80-I-1-3, a cranial fragment; MLP 82-I-28-2, a vertebra; MLP 82-I-3-1/4, four caudal centers		
Mosasauridae	Indeterminate	Seymour Island	DJ.957.133, 18 partially articulated caudal vertebrae, four of which possess transverse process, and DJ.957.505 a caudal vertebra		
Mosasauridae	Indeterminate	Filo Negro Section	MLP 82-I-26-1, a pygal vertebra		
Mosasauridae	Indeterminate	Seymour Island	IAA-Pv 819, an almost complete right humerus.		
Mosasauridae	Indeterminate	Seymour Island	MLP 82-I-5-1, fragments of vertebrae and ribs		
Mosasaurus	aff. M. hoffmanni	Seymour Island	DJ.1053.10, a large, fragmentary skull	A mosasaurine	
Mosasaurus	cf. M. lemonnieri	Seymour Island	MLP 92-XII-30, skull fragments including one tooth and a relatively short, and medially constricted suprastapedial process of the quadrate	A mosasaurine	
Mosasaurus	M. sp.	Seymour Island	DJ.1020.2-A, DJ.1020.2-B and DJ.1053.14- A, teeth; MLP 83-X-12-2, a caudal vertebra	A mosasaurine	
Mosasaurus	M. sp.	Seymour Island	MLP 15-I-24-41, a partial skull including, partial frontal, right postorbital, parietal, right quadrate, right posterior end of basisphenoid, right coronoid, right angular, splenial and right surangular, a broken marginal tooth and several pterygoid teeth have been associated to this specimen.	A mosasaurine	
Plioplatecarpus	P. sp.	Seymour Island	DJ.1020.2-C, DJ.1020.2-H and DJ.952.266, teeth	A plioplatecarpine	
Plioplatecarpus	P. sp.	Quebrada de la Foca muerta	MLP 79-I-1/20, several vertebrae	A plioplatecarpine	
Tylosaurinae	Indeterminate	Bahía Fósiles	MLP 87-II-7-1, a vertebra; MLP 86-X-28-7, an anterior caudal vertebra		
Tylosaurinae	Indeterminate	Seymour Island	DJ.956.41, two or three caudal vertebrae		
Tylosaurinae	Indeterminate	Filo Negro Section	lam. II, 7-8, a vertebra		

==== Fish ====
===== Bony fishes =====
Bony fish recorded from López de Bertodano Formation
Genus	Species	Member/location	Material	Description	Image
Antarctiberyx	A. seymouri	Seymour Island	TTU P9210. A poorly preserved anterior skull section with partial dentary attached	A member of Beryciformes	
Enchodus	E. sp.	Seymour Island	One palatine tooth, MLP 12-XI-29-43; five teeth, MLP 12-XI-29-25 to 28; one tooth, MLP 12-XI-29-53; thirty-five teeth, MLP 12-XI-29-55; fifty-three teeth, MLP 12-XI-29-56	A member of Enchodontidae	
Ichthyodectiformes	Indeterminate	Seymour Island	One tooth, MLP 12-XI-29-21; ninety-four teeth, MLP 12-XI-29-38; thirteen teeth, MLP 12-XI-29-51; seventy-eight teeth, MLP 12-XI-29-52; one tooth, MLP 12-XI-29-54.		
Pachycormidae	Indeterminate	Seymour Island	Isolated and fragmentary caudal fin-rays, MLP 13XI-29-57.		

===== Chondrichthyes =====
Chondrichthyes recorded from López de Bertodano Formation
Genus	Species	Member/location	Material	Description	Image
Callorhinchus	C. sp.	Seymour Island	Teeth	A Chimaera	
Carcharias	cf. C. sp.	Seymour Island	Two left upper lateral teeth preserving one root branch and lateral denticle, MLP 13-XI-29-35, MLP 13-XI-29-37; one right upper lateral tooth preserving one root branch and lateral denticle, MLP 13-XI-29-36; several fragmentary teeth, MLP 13-XI29-4, MLP13-XI-29-44 to46, MLP13-XI-29-16, MLP 13-XI-29-13 to 14.	A Odontaspididae Shark	
"Cretalamna"	"C. appendiculata"	Seymour Island	One lateral lower tooth which lacks crown tip, distal lateral cusplet, and distal root branch, MLP 13XI-29-47; one anterior upper tooth lacking the distal root branch, distal lateral cusplet, and crown tip, MLP 13-XI-29-2	A Otodontidae Shark	
Lamniformes	Indeterminate	Seymour Island	Four crowns, MLP 13-XI-29-30.		
Notidanodon	N. sp.	Seymour Island	Teeth	A Hexanchidae Shark	
Notidanodon	?N. sp.	Seymour Island	Teeth	A Hexanchidae Shark	
Paraorthacodus	P. sp.	Seymour Island	Four fragmentary teeth, MLP 13-XI-29-8, MLP 13XI-29-18, MLP 13-XI-29-31, and MLP 13-XI-29-32.	A Paraorthacodontidae Shark	
Propristiophorus	aff. P. sp.	Seymour Island	Three fragmentary rostral spines, MLP 13-XI-2939, MLP 13-XI-29-40, and MLP 13-XI-29-41.	A Pristiophoridae Shark	
Protosqualus	P. sp.	Seymour Island	Two lateral, almost complete teeth, MLP 13-XI29-9, MLP 13-XI-29-33; one latero-posterior, complete tooth, MLP 13-XI-29-10	A Squalidae Shark	
Sphenodus	S. sp.	Seymour Island	Teeth	A Orthacodontidae Shark	
Sphenodus	S. sp.	Seymour Island	Two fragmentary teeth, MLP 13-XI-29-20, MLP 13-XI-29-11	A Orthacodontidae Shark	
Xampylodon	X. diastemacron	Filo Negro Section, Klb 9	MN 7825-V (holotype),incomplete posterolateral tooth of the lower jaw, with only its anterior portion still preserved	A Hexanchidae Shark	

=== Other fossils ===
Ammonites

Ammonites recorded from López de Bertodano Formation
Genus	Species	Member/location	Material	Description	Image
Diplomoceras	D. cylindraceum			A paperclip-shaped Ammonite.	
Gaudryceras	G. seymouriense				
Grossouvrites	G. joharae				
Kitchinites	K. laurae				
Maorites	M. densicostatus				
Pachydiscus	P. (Pachydiscus) ultimus				
Pseudophyllites	P. cf. loryi				
Zelandites	Z. varuna				

Other invertebrates

Invertebrates recorded from López de Bertodano Formation
Genus	Species	Member/location	Material	Description	Image
Eutrephoceras	E. dorbignyanum				
Cyathocidaris	C. nordenskjoldi				
Cyathocidaris	C. patera				
Metacrinus	cf. M. sp.				
Nielsenicrinus	N. sp.				
Rotularia	R. fallax				

== Flora ==
The Maastrichtian represented a period of coolhouse conditions following the gradual global cooling from the Cretaceous Thermal Maximum. Coincident with this trend, an overturning of the Antarctic floral composition occurred during this time, particularly with the diversification of Nothofagaceae and the disappearance of some more archaic angiosperm forms. Other important constituents of the Antarctic floral communities include; Araucariaceae, Podocarpaceae, Atherospermataceae, Myrtaceae, Proteaceae, and Cunoniaceae. Fossil wood and sparse leaves indicates a canopy dominated by Nothofagus, whose wood anatomy suggested a rainforest climate as well as a transition towards deciduousness. Tree rings in Maastrichtian fossil wood are significantly narrower and more distinct than the preceding Coniacian-Campanian periods, indicating less productive growing conditions, and among fossil forests recorded in Antarctica, the Maastrichtian recorded the highest frequency of deferred optimum vessel diameter tree rings which occur when growth commences due to ample moisture availability but temperatures are below the required threshold for peak transpiration. This scenario is common among Nothofagus growing at ca. 55°S today. One study using fossil wood characters calculated mean annual temperatures between 7.3–9.94 °C (45.14–49.89 °F), overall supporting a cool temperate climate for the Maastrichtian Antarctic Peninsula.

Color key: Taxon / Reclassified taxon / Taxon falsely reported as present / Dubious taxon or junior synonym / Ichnotaxon / Ootaxon / Morphotaxon	Notes; Uncertain or tentative taxa are in small text; ~~crossed out~~ taxa are discredited.

Taxa	Species	Locality	Material	Notes	Images
Antarctoxylon	A. juglandoides			Tentatively compared to Juglans.	
Araucaria	A. fibrosa			Fossil leaves similar to the extant Araucaria araucana.	
Araucarioxylon	A. sp.			An Araucariaceaous wood morphotaxon.	
Atherospermoxylon	A. sp.			An Atherospermataceaous wood morphotaxon.	
Eucryphiaceoxylon	E. eucryphioides			A Eucryphiaceous wood morphotaxon.	
Laurelites	L. jamesrossii			An Atherospermataceaous wood morphotaxon. Similar to Laureliopsis.	
Microcachryxylon	M. gothani			A Podocarpaceous wood morphotaxon. Similar to M. tetragona.	
Myrceugenelloxylon	M. antarcticus			A Myrtaceaous wood morphotaxon. Similar to Myrceugenia.	
Nothofagus	N. sp.			Identical to leaves found in the Snow Hill Island Formation.	
Nothofagoxylon	N. scalariforme			A Nothofagaceaous wood morphotaxon, Subgenus Nothofagus.	
Nothofagoxylon	N. corrugatus			A Nothofagaceaous wood morphotaxon, Subgenus Fuscospora.	
Nothofagoxylon	N. aconcaguaense			A Nothofagaceaous wood morphotaxon, Subgenus Lophozonia.	
Nothofagoxylon	N. ruei			A Nothofagaceaous wood morphotaxon, Subgenus Lophozonia.	
Nothofagoxylon	N. kraeuseli			A Nothofagaceaous wood morphotaxon, Subgenus Lophozonia or Fuscospora.	
Phyllocladoxylon	P. sp.			A Podocarpaceaous wood morphotaxon.	
Podocarpoxylon	P. sp.			A Podocarpaceous wood morphotaxon.	
Sassafrasoxylon	S. sp.			Tentatively compared to Sassafras.	

== See also ==
- Chorrillo Formation
- Dorotea Formation
- Lists of dinosaur-bearing stratigraphic units
- List of fossiliferous stratigraphic units in Antarctica
- Snow Hill Island Formation
- Sobral Formation
- South Polar region of the Cretaceous
