= Snow Hill Island Formation =

Geologic formation in Antarctica

- Stratigraphic range: Late Campanian-Early Maastrichtian; ~73.4–69.7 Ma
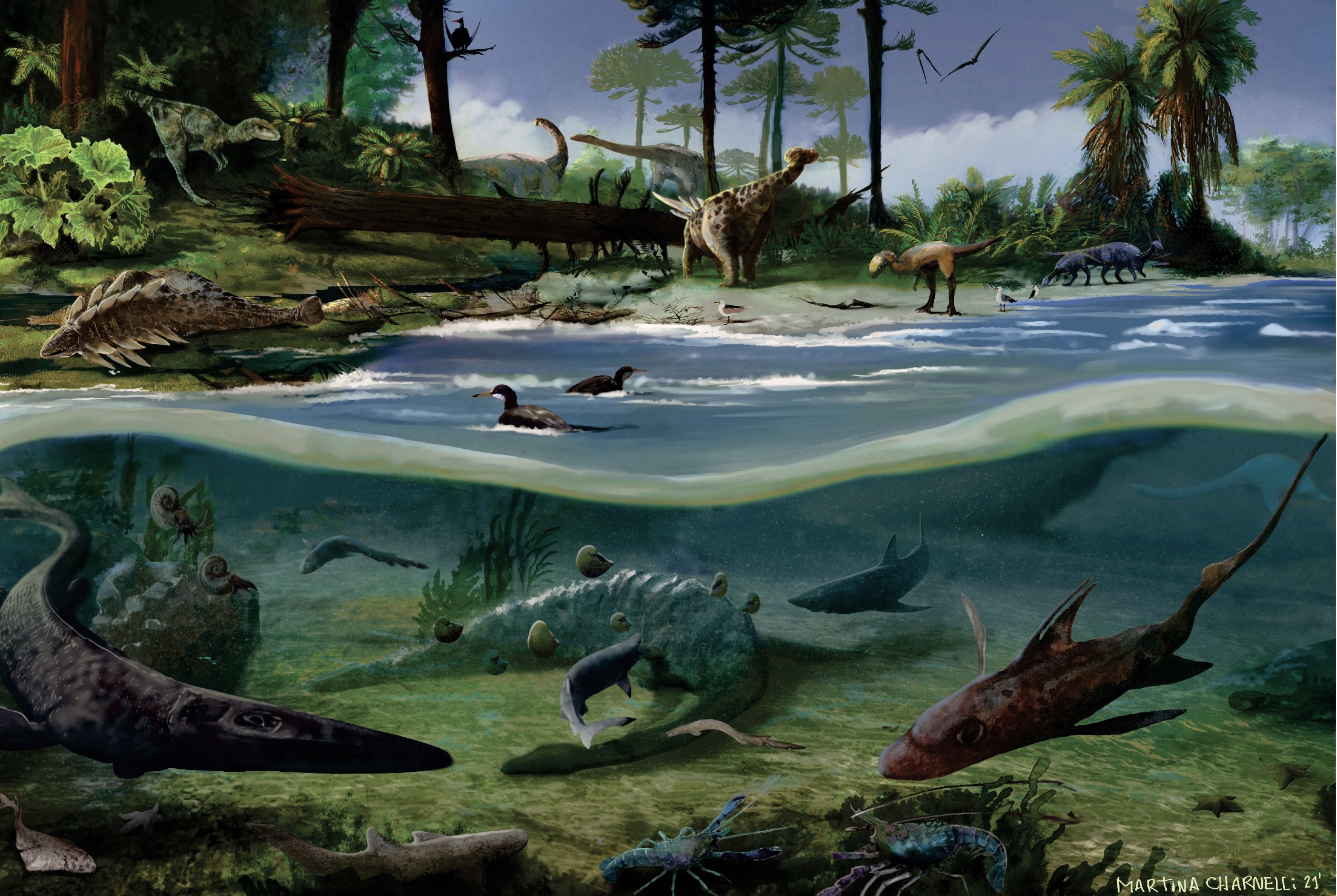
- Artist's reconstruction of the paleoenvironment of the Snow Hill Island Formation
- Type: Geological formation
- Unit of: Marambio Group
- Sub-units: Gamma & Herbert Sound Members
- Underlies: López de Bertodano Formation
- Overlies: Santa Marta Formation

Lithology
- Primary: Sandstone
- Other: Mudstone

Location
- Coordinates: 63.9°S 57.9°W
- Approximate paleocoordinates: 61.8°S 68.5°W
- Region: James Ross Island, James Ross Island group
- Country: Argentine Antarctica, British Antarctic Territory, Chilean Antarctic Territory
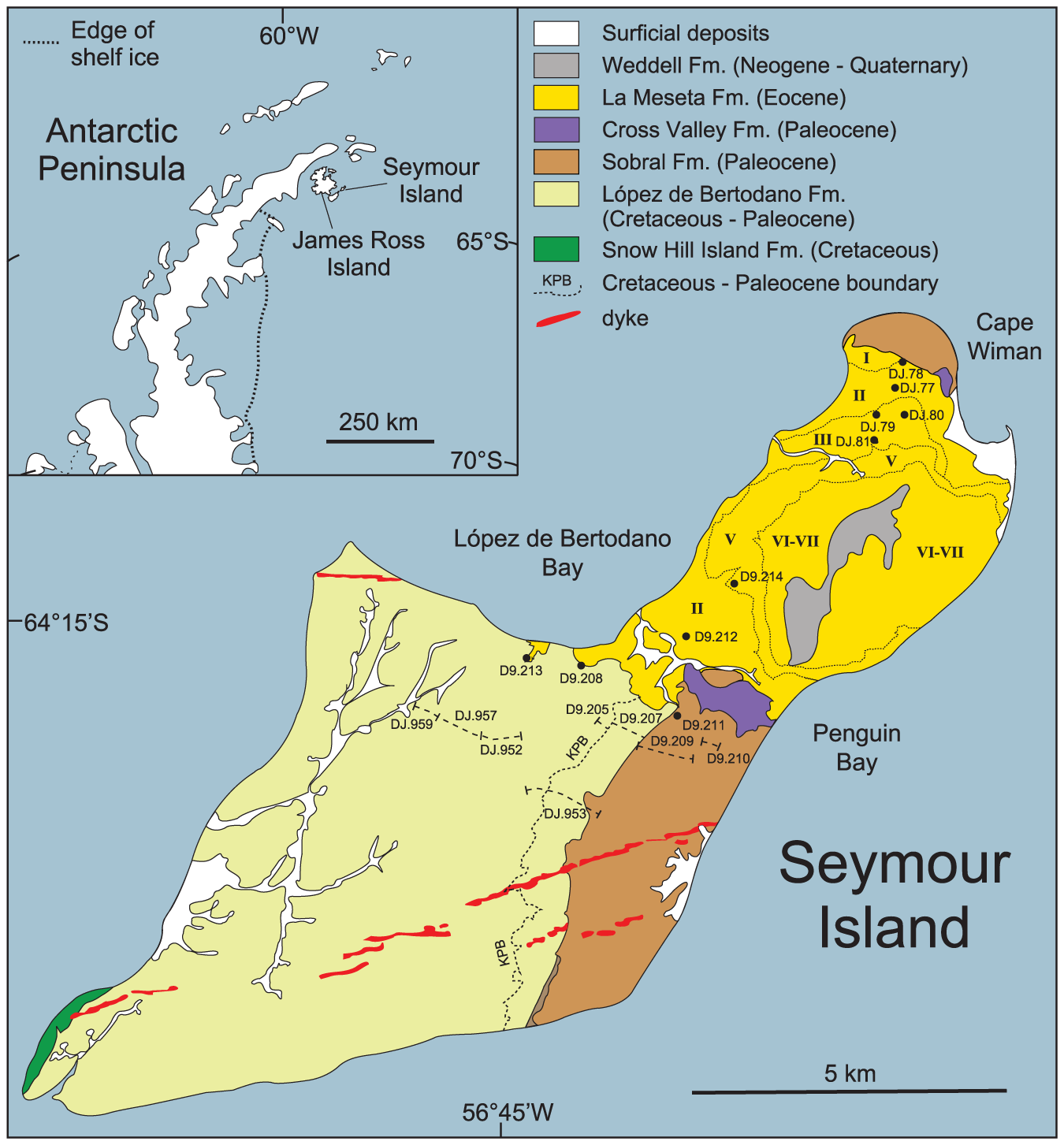
- Geologic map of Seymour Island, Antarctica with Snow Hill Island Formation in dark green

The Snow Hill Island Formation is an Early Maastrichtian geologic formation found on James Ross Island, James Ross Island group, Antarctica. Remains of a paravian theropod Imperobator antarcticus have been recovered from it, as well as the elasmarian ornithopods Trinisaura santamartaensis and Morrosaurus antarcticus, the ankylosaurian Antarctopelta oliveroi, and the shark Notidanodon sp. Alongside these described genera are also the remains of indeterminate elasmosaurids, lithostrotian titanosaurs and an indeterminate pterosaur.

The uppermost portion of the Gamma Member containing the Santa Marta Cove fauna is dated to the late Campanian, approximately 73.4 million years ago, while the younger Cape Lamb Member is from the latest Campanian to early Maastrichtian, with the uppermost portion dated to 69.7 million years ago.

== Paleofauna ==
=== Invertebrates ===
==== Anthozoa ====
Genus	Species	Presence	Material	Notes	Images
Astreopora	?A. sp.	Gamma Member	Imprints	Acroporidae scleractinian	Specimen of the same genus
Fungiacyathus	F. deltoidophorus	Karlsen Cliffs Member	Imprints	Fungiidae scleractinian	Specimen of the same genus
Fungiacyathus	F. antarcticus	Nordenskjöld's hut	Imprints	Fungiidae scleractinian	Specimen of the same genus
Fungiacyathus	F. larseni	Nordenskjöld's hut	Imprints	Fungiidae scleractinian	Specimen of the same genus
Scleractinia indet.	Unidentifiable	Karlsen Cliffs Member	Imprints		
Waiparaconus	W. imbricatus	Cape Lamb, Vega Island	Complete specimens (MN 12294-I)	Waiparaconidae, likely a Sea Pen	

==== Arthropoda ====
Genus	Species	Presence	Material	Notes	Images
Angarestia	A. australensis	East side of Leal Bluff	Specimens	A Glypheidae lobster	
Cristafrons	C. praescientis	East side of Leal Bluff	Specimens	A Raninidae crab	
Hadrocarcinus	H. wrighti	East side of Leal Bluff	Specimens	A Necrocarcinidae crab	
Hoploparia	H. stokesi	East side of Leal Bluff; Humps Island	Specimens	A clawed lobster	

==== Mollusks ====
Genus	Species	Presence	Material	Notes	Images
Cymatoceras	C. spp.	Santa Marta Cove	Shells	A Nautilid	
Diplomoceras	D. cylindraceum	Day Nunatak	Shells	A Diplomoceratidae ammonite	Reconstruction
Diplomoceras	D. lambi	Day Nunatak; Cape Lamb	Shells	A Diplomoceratidae ammonite. Likely a junior synonym of D. cylindraceum	Reconstruction
Eutrephoceras	E. spp.	Day Nunatak	Shells	A Nautilid	
Gunnarites	G. antarcticus	Vega Island; Day Nunatak; Santa Marta Cove	Shells	A Kossmaticeratidae ammonite	
Jacobites	J. crofti	Day Nunatak	Shells	A Kossmaticeratidae ammonite	
Laevidentalium	L.? sp.	Paso San José, Point 96	Shells	A Laevidentaliidae scaphopodan	Extant member of the genus
Maorites	M. seymourianus	Day Nunatak; Al's Bird Site; Vega Island	Shells	A Kossmaticeratidae ammonite	
Oistotrigonia	O. pygoscelium	Day Nunatak	Shells	A Pterotrigoniidae bivalve	
Pinna	P. frenexiae	Day Nunatak	Shells	A Pinnidae bivalve	Extant specimen
Pinna	P. anderssoni	Day Nunatak	Shells	A Pinnidae bivalve	Extant specimen
Pseudophyllites	P. loryi	Day Nunatak	Shells	A Tetragonitidae ammonite	
Struthiochenopus	S. hurleyi	Day Nunatak	Shells	An Aporrhaidae gastropod	

=== Vertebrates ===
==== Fish ====
Genus	Species	Presence	Material	Notes	Images
Albuliformes indet.	Indeterminate	Santa Marta Cove	Isolated vertebra, IAA-IRJ2000-24		
Antarctichthys	A. longipectoralis	Santa Marta Cove	MN 7838-V, single and incomplete specimen	A Dercetidae fish	
Apateodus	cf. A. sp.	Santa Marta Cove	teeth	Alepisauriformes fish	
Callorhinchus	C. sp.	Santa Marta Cove	teeth	A Chimaera	
Callorhinchus	Cf. C. sp.	Cape Lamb	Teeth	A Chimaera	
Centrophoroides	C. sp.	Santa Marta Cove	Teeth	A Squalidae shark	
Chimaera	C. zangerli	Santa Marta Cove, James Ross Island	Teeth	A chimaera	Extant member of the genus
Chlamydoselachus	C. thompsoni	Santa Marta Cove, James Ross Island	Complete dentition	A frilled shark	Extant member of the genus
Cretalamna	C. appendiculatta	Santa Marta Cove	Teeth	An Otodontidae shark	
Edaphodon	E. snowhillensis	Herbert Sound Member	MLP 13- I-26-1, complete dentition	A large species of chimaera	
Enchodus	E. sp.	Santa Marta Cove	IAA-IRJ2000-32, IAA-IRJ2000-33, teeth	Enchodontidae fish	Restoration
Ichthyodectiformes indet.	Indeterminate	Vega island	MLP 15-XI-7-11, body scale patch		
Lamniformes indet.	Indeterminate	Santa Marta Cove	(IAA-IRJ2000-9 to IAA-IRJ2000-10, BAS DJ.172.11, teeth		
Notidanodon	N. dentatus	Santa Marta Cove; Vega Island	(MLP 95-IV-1), lateral tooth embedded in the hosting rock	A cow shark	
Notidanodon	N. sp.	Santa Marta Cove		A cow shark	
Paraorthacodus	P. antarcticus	Santa Marta Cove	IAA-IRJ2000-19; BAS DJ.136.2, teeth	A Synechodontiform	
Rhinochimaeridae indet.	Indeterminate	Santa Marta Cove	Teeth		
Scapanorhynchus	S. spp.	Santa Marta Cove	IAA-IRJ2000-11	A Mitsukurinidae shark	Reconstruction
Scapanorhynchus	Cf. S. sp.	Santa Marta Cove	Teeth	A Mitsukurinidae shark	Reconstruction
Sphenocephalidae indet.	Indeterminate	False Island Point	DJ. 360.8, small, incomplete, and poorly-preserved specimen that lack its skull and the anterior part of the body		
Sphenodus	S. sp.	Santa Marta Cove	IAA-IRJ2000-17 and IAA-IRJ2000-18, teeth	An Orthacodontid	
Squatina	S. cf.hassei	Santa Marta Cove	IAA-IRJ2000-10-IAA-IRJ2000-16	An Angelshark	Extant member of the genus

==== Pterosaurs ====
Genus	Species	Presence	Material	Notes	Images
Pterodactyloidea indet.	Indeterminate	Camp Lamb, Vega Island	MN 7801-V, a wing metacarpal IV	A pterosaur with an estimated wingspan of 4 to 5 meters	

==== Dinosaurs ====
Genus	Species	Presence	Material	Notes	Images
Antarcticavis	A. capelambensis	Cape Lambe Member, Vega Island	A partial skeleton (SDSM 78147) consists of two thoracic vertebrae, the sternum keel, the right coracoid and shoulder blade, the sternal part of the left coracoid, the right upper arm, parts of the left upper arm, the proximal right ulna, the proximal left ulna and radius (articulated), the proximal right carpometacarpus, the proximal left carpometacarpus, the distal left carpometacarpus, the synsacrum, the right and left thighs, the proximal right tibiotarsus, the right and left distal tibiotarsus, and the proximal right tarsometatarsus	An avialan of uncertain phylogenetic placement	
Antarctopelta	A. oliveroi	Santa Marta Cove	A partial skeleton (MLP 86-X-28-1) consists of three isolated teeth, part of the lower jaw with another tooth in situ, some other skull fragments, vertebrae of the neck, back, hips and tail, some shoulder and hip bones (scapula, ilium) a thigh bone (femur), foot and hand bones (five metapodials and two phalanges), and numerous pieces of armor	A parankylosaur	Life restoration of Antarctopelta oliveroi
"Biscoveosaurus"	Indeterminate	Cape Lamb Member	NHMUK PV R 36760, dentaries, teeth, a braincase, parts of the maxillae, forelimb elements, assorted vertebrae, and the pectoral girdle	An ornithopod	
Elasmaria indet.	Indeterminate	Santa Marta Cove	Two isolated ungual phalanges (MLP 07-III-2-1 and MLP 07-III-2-2)		
Elasmaria indet.	Indeterminate	Fortress Hill	Limb, foot		
Elasmaria indet.	Indeterminate	Vega Island	BMNH BAS R.2450		
Gaviiformes indet.	Indeterminate	Vega Island	MLP 98-I-10-47: incomplete tarsometatarsus; MLP 98-I-10-50: incomplete right tarsometatarsus; MLP 98-I-10-51: proximal end of left femur		
Imperobator	I. antarcticus	Cape Lamb Member, Naze Peninsula	A single specimen that contains skull fragments possibly from the premaxilla, maxilla, and dentary as well as a caudal vertebra, teeth, and pedal elements, UCMP 276000	A potential Unenlagiinae paravian	Imperobator as an Unenlagiid
Lithostrotia indet.	Indeterminate	Loma Verde, near Santa Marta Cove	11-II-20-1, incomplete middle caudal vertebra	Non-Saltasaurinae	
Morrosaurus	M. antarcticus	Cape Lamb Member	Fragmentary right hind limb	An elasmarian ornithopod	Life restoration of Morrosaurus antarcticus
Neornithes indet.	Indeterminate	Vega Island	MLP 98-I-10-25, left tarsometatarsus		
Ornithurae indet.	Indeterminate	Cape Lamb	AMNH FARB 30920, thoracic vertebra		
Theropoda indet.	Indeterminate	Cape Lamb	MLP 15-I-7-2, isolated pedal phalax (digit III?)		
Trinisaura	T. santamartaensis	Santa Marta Cove, in the lower levels of the formation	MLP08-III-1-1, disarticulated and partial skeleton that includes one incomplete dorsal vertebra, three sacral centra, seven caudal vertebrae; two incomplete dorsal rib shafts, one proximal haemal arch, incomplete right scapulocoracoid, incomplete right humerus, two metacarpals, both ilia, right pubis, right ischium, right femur, right distal tibia, incomplete metatarsal III, first phalanx of pedal digit III, two phalanges of pedal digit IV, and indeterminate fragments	An elasmarian ornithopod	Life restoration of Trinisaura

==== Plesiosaurs ====
Genus	Species	Presence	Material	Notes	Images
Aristonectinae indet.	Indeterminate	Santa Marta Cove	SGO.PV.6579, fragmentary postcranial skeleton preserving eight fragmentary caudal centra, two articular propodial heads (likely femora), an epipodial (likely a fibula), ventral portion of the right ilium, partial left pubis, and several rib portions		Vegasaurus
Elasmosauridae indet.	Indeterminate	Monolithic Lake; Santa Marta Cove	"MLP 11-II-20-4, one cervical vertebra preserving a partial rib; MLP 86-X-28-3, two cervical vertebrae; MLP 86-X-28-(2–6), 10 posterior cervical vertebrae articulated with three pectoral vertebrae, part of two dorsal vertebrae, ribs, and indeterminate fragments"		Vegasaurus
Elasmosauridae indet.	Indeterminate	Santa Marta Cove	SGO.PV.6508, one isolated cervical vertebral centrum		Vegasaurus
Elasmosauridae indet.	Indeterminate	W Santa Marta Cove	MN 7820-V, four vertebral centra and fragments of another six centra		Vegasaurus
Elasmosauridae indet.	Indeterminate	Cape Lamb	MLP 98-I-10-20, an incomplete postcranial skeleton (juvenile)		Vegasaurus
Elasmosauridae indet.	Indeterminate	Vega Island	SDSM 78156 (a nearly complete, articulated torso, partial paddles, and neck and tail sections)		Vegasaurus
Plesiosauria indet.	Indeterminate	The Naze	DJ.355.140, half of large water-worn vertebra, either anterior trunk or distal cervical vertebra		Vegasaurus
Plesiosauroidea indet.	Indeterminate	The Naze; Cape Lamb	MLP 78-XI-1-2; MLP 78-XI-1-1, vertebrae and fragments		Vegasaurus
Vegasaurus	V. molyi	Cape Lamb member, Vega Island	MLP 93-I-5-1, postcranial skeleton preserving a complete cervical region with 54 cervical vertebrae, three pectoral vertebrae, 17 dorsal vertebrae, three sacral vertebrae, anterior and medial caudal vertebrae, pectoral and pelvic girdles, forelimbs and hind limbs, ribs, and gastroliths	A plesiosaur	Vegasaurus
Weddellonectia indet.	Indeterminate	Cape Lamb	MLP 15-I-7-6, partial skull comprising caudal half of pterygoids, basisphenoid, basioccipital, squamosal, exoccipitalopisthotic; cervical, dorsal, sacral and caudal centra; cervical and dorsal ribs, partially preserved coracoid, two partially preserved propodials		Vegasaurus
Weddellonectia indet.	Indeterminate	Cape Lamb	AMNH FARB 30877 is a largely articulated partial skeleton.		Vegasaurus

==== Mosasaurs ====
Genus	Species	Presence	Material	Notes	Images
Liodon	L. sp.	Cape Lamb	Teeth	A Mosasaur	Taniwhasaurus
Liodon	Cf. L. sp.	Cape Lamb	Teeth	A Mosasaur	Taniwhasaurus
Mosasaurus	M. cf. M. lemonnieri	Cape Lamb	Teeth	A Mosasaur	Taniwhasaurus
Plioplatecarpus	cf. P. sp.	Cape Lamb	MLP 93-I-3-5, small tooth		Taniwhasaurus
Taniwhasaurus	T. antarcticus	Santa Marta Cove; Al's Bird Site	IAA 2000-JR-FSM-1, containing a skull measuring 72 cm (28 in) long, teeth, some vertebrae, and rib fragments	A tylosaur	Taniwhasaurus
Taniwhasaurus	cf. T. antarcticus	Al's Bird Site	MLP 93-I-3-7, a tooth crown	A tylosaur	Taniwhasaurus
Tylosaurinae indet.	Indeterminate	Vega Island	Juvenile skull		Taniwhasaurus

== Plants ==
Color key: Taxon / Reclassified taxon / Taxon falsely reported as present / Dubious taxon or junior synonym / Ichnotaxon / Ootaxon / Morphotaxon

Notes
Uncertain or tentative taxa are in small text
~~crossed out~~ taxa are discredited.

Equivalent environment from older (Turonian-Santonian) nearby areas.

During the Campanian–Maastrichtian, the Antarctic Peninsula supported temperate, humid forests dominated by podocarps, araucarian conifers, and a diversifying group of angiosperms. Key angiosperm families included Nothofagaceae, Monimiaceae, Cunoniaceae, Proteaceae, Myrtaceae, Lauraceae, Atherospermataceae, Winteraceae, and extinct Sassafras-like forms. Another important group is Asteraceae, with Dasyphyllum-like pollen, the oldest fossils ever found for the family. At The Naze area, Podocarpaceae-Nothofagus rainforests thriving in lowland areas under cool-temperate, frost-free, and high-rainfall conditions, with understories rich in other angiosperms and ferns. Smaller components, likely endemic, included lycophytes, bryophytes, Proteaceae, Liliaceae, Palmae or Microthyriaceae, and various herbaceous or shrubby dicotyledons. Forests were structurally similar to modern Valdivian temperate forests. These plants were primarily found in riparian floodplains, with bryophyte-lycophyte rich swamps and Chlorophyta-rich lake margins, while influence of marine waters can be seen by Dinoflagellates. The climate was highly humid and seasonal, as evidenced by distinct growth rings in Agathoxylon fossil wood from Lachman Crags and The Naze, indicating a temperate but variable environment. The flora reflects a transition from gymnosperm-dominated to mixed angiosperm-conifer ecosystems under polar greenhouse conditions. Wildfires happened commonly in the region, most fueled by volcanic activity.

=== Pteridophytes, lycophytes, and bryophytes ===
Taxa	Species	Locality	Material	Notes	Images
Baculatisporites	B. comaumensis	Santa Marta Cove; The Naze	Spore	Osmundaceae	
Biretisporites	B. potoniaei	The Naze	Spore	Fern affinity	
Calamospora	sp.	The Naze	Spore	Equisetales	
Camarozonosporites	C. ohioensis	The Naze	Spore	Fern affinity	
Ceratosporites	C. equalis	The Naze	Spore	Fern affinity	
Cyatheacidites	C. annulatus	Santa Marta Cove; The Naze	Spore	Dicksoniaceae (Lophosoria)	Lophosoria
Cyatheacidites	C. archangelskii	The Naze	Spore	Cyatheaceae	
Cyathidites	C. australis	The Naze	Spore	Cyatheaceae	Cyathea
Cyathidites	C. minor	Santa Marta Cove; The Naze	Spore	Cyatheaceae (Cyathea)	Cyathea
Deltoidospora	sp.	Santa Marta Cove	Spore	Fern affinity	
Densoisporites	D. velatus	The Naze	Spore	Lycophyte affinity	
Dictyotosporites	D. speciosus	The Naze	Spore	Fern affinity	
Echinosporis	sp.	Santa Marta Cove	Spore	Fern affinity	
Gleicheniidites	G. circinidites	Santa Marta Cove	Spore	Gleicheniaceae (aff. Gleichenia)	Gleichenia
Gleicheniidites	G. senonicus	The Naze	Spore	Gleicheniaceae (aff. Gleichenia)	Gleichenia
Herkosporites	sp.	The Naze	Spore	Fern affinity	
Ischyosporites	I. volkheimeri	The Naze	Spore	Fern affinity	
cf. Klukisporites	K. scaberis	The Naze	Spore	Lygodiaceae	
Laevigatosporites	L. ovatus	Santa Marta Cove; The Naze	Spore	Polypodiaceae	
Leiotriletes	sp.	Santa Marta Cove	Spore	Fern affinity	
Lycopodiumsporites	L. eminulus	The Naze	Spore	Lycopodiaceae (Lycopodium)	
Millerocaulis	M. santamartaensis	Santa Marta Cove	Fossil stem (hand specimens, slides)	Osmundaceae	
Peromonolites	P. bowenii	The Naze	Spore	Fern affinity	
Perotrilites	P. majus	The Naze	Spore	Fern affinity	
Polypodiisporites	P. favus	The Naze	Spore	Polypodiaceae	
Polypodiisporites	sp.	The Naze	Spore	Polypodiaceae	
Retitriletes	R. austroclavatidites	Santa Marta Cove; The Naze	Spore	Lycopodiaceae (Lycopodium)	Lycopodium
Stereisporites	S. antiquasporites	Santa Marta Cove; The Naze	Spore	Sphagnaceae (moss)	
Stereisporites	S. regium	The Naze	Spore	Moss affinity	
Todisporites	T. major	The Naze	Spore	Fern affinity	
Todisporites	T. minor	The Naze	Spore	Fern affinity	
Trilites	T. parvallatus	The Naze; Santa Marta Cove	Spore	Dicksoniaceae (Dicksonia)	Dicksonia
Trilites	T. tuberculiformis	Santa Marta Cove	Spore	Dicksoniaceae (Dicksonia)	Dicksonia
Triporoletes	T. radiatus	The Naze	Spore	Fern affinity	
Tuberculatosporites	T. parvus	The Naze	Spore	Fern affinity	
Verrucosisporites	sp. 2	Santa Marta Cove	Spore	Fern affinity	

=== Gymnosperms (conifers) ===
Taxa	Species	Locality	Material	Notes	Images
Agathoxylon	A. pseudoparenchymatosum	Seymour Island; Caleta Santa Marta	Wood	Araucariaceae	
Agathoxylon	A. arayai	Caleta Santa Marta; Byers Peninsula	Wood	Araucariaceae	
Araucaria	A. antarctica	Cape Lamb	Cone and wood	Araucariaceae	Extant representatives of the genus
Araucariacites	A. australis	Seymour Island; The Naze	Pollen	Araucariaceae	
Cycadopites	spp.	Seymour Island	Pollen	Cycadales	
Dacrycarpites	D. australiensis	Seymour Island; The Naze	Pollen	Podocarpaceae (Dacrycarpus)	Dacrycarpus
Dacrydiumites	spp.	Seymour Island	Pollen	Podocarpaceae (Dacrydium)	
Dilwynites	D. granulatus	The Naze	Pollen	Araucariaceae	
Equisetosporites	sp.	The Naze	Pollen	Ephedrales	
Lygistepollenites	L. balmei	Seymour Island	Pollen	Podocarpaceae (Dacrydium)	Dacrydium
Lygistepollenites	L. florinii	Seymour Island	Pollen	Podocarpaceae (Dacrydium)	Dacrydium
Microcachryidites	M. antarcticus	Santa Marta Cove; Seymour Island; The Naze	Pollen	Podocarpaceae (Microcachrys)	Microcachrys
Microcachryxylon	M. gothani	Cerro Naze	Wood	Podocarpaceae	
Phyllocladidites	P. mawsonii	Santa Marta Cove; Seymour Island; The Naze	Pollen	Podocarpaceae (Lagarostrobos)	Lagarostrobos
Phyllocladidites	spp.	Seymour Island	Pollen	Podocarpaceae (Phyllocladus)	
Phyllocladoxylon	P. antarcticum	Seymour Island; Brandy Bay	Wood	Podocarpaceae	
Podocarpidites	P. elegans	Santa Marta Cove	Pollen	Podocarpaceae (Podocarpus)	Podocarpus
Podocarpidites	P. major	The Naze	Pollen	Podocarpaceae	Podocarpus
Podocarpidites	P. marwickii	The Naze	Pollen	Podocarpaceae	Podocarpus
Podocarpidites	P. microreticuloidata	Santa Marta Cove	Pollen	Podocarpaceae (Podocarpus)	Podocarpus
Podocarpidites	P. otagoensis	The Naze	Pollen	Podocarpaceae	Podocarpus
Podocarpidites	P. rugulatus	The Naze	Pollen	Podocarpaceae	Podocarpus
Podocarpidites	P. verrucosus	The Naze	Pollen	Podocarpaceae	Podocarpus
Podocarpidites	spp.	Seymour Island; The Naze	Pollen	Podocarpaceae	Podocarpus
Podocarpoxylon	P. sp. 1	Caleta Santa Marta	Wood	Podocarpaceae	
Podocarpoxylon	P. sp. 2	Caleta Santa Marta	Wood	Podocarpaceae	
Podocarpoxylon	P. sp. 3	Caleta Santa Marta	Wood	Podocarpaceae	
Podosporites	spp.	Seymour Island	Pollen	Podocarpaceae (Microcachrys/Microstrobos)	Pherosphaera
Trichotomosulcites	T. subgranulatus	Seymour Island; The Naze	Pollen	Araucariaceae	

=== Angiosperms ===
Taxa	Species	Locality	Material	Notes	Images
Amosopollis	cruciformis	Seymour Island; The Naze	Pollen	Dicotyledonae	
Anacolosidites	sp.	Seymour Island	Pollen	Olacaceae	
Battenipollis	sectilis	The Naze	Pollen	Proteaceae	
Clavatipollenites	sp.	Seymour Island	Pollen	Chloranthaceae (cf. Ascarina)	Ascarina
Cranwellia	striata	Seymour Island	Pollen	Loranthaceae	
Cranwellipollis	palisadus	Seymour Island	Pollen	Proteaceae	
Cranwellipollis	sp.	Seymour Island	Pollen	Proteaceae	
Ericipites	scabratus	The Naze	Pollen	Ericaceae	
Eucryphiaceoxylon	E. eucryphioides	Day Nunatak	Wood	Cunoniaceae	
Forcipites	sabulosus	Seymour Island	Pollen	Dicotyledonae	
Forcipites	sp. cf. F. longus	Seymour Island	Pollen	Dicotyledonae	
Gambierina	rudata	Seymour Island	Pollen	Dicotyledonae	
Haloragacidites	harrisii	Seymour Island	Pollen	Casuarinaceae	
Hedycaryoxylon	tambourissoides	Eastern side of Lachman Crags	Wood	Monimiaceae (cf. Tambourissa)	Tambourissa
Illicioxylon	tenuiradiatum	Lachman Crags	Wood	Illiciaceae	
Ilexpollenites	sp.	Seymour Island	Pollen	Aquifoliaceae	
Lewalanipollis	senectus	Seymour Island	Pollen	Proteaceae (cf. Persoonioideae, Proteoideae)	
Liliacidites	cf. kaitangataensis	Seymour Island	Pollen	Liliaceae	
Liliacidites	spp.	The Naze	Pollen	Liliaceae	
Longapertites	sp.	The Naze	Pollen	Arecaceae	
Longexylon	L. oliveroi	Day Nunatak	Wood	Lauraceae	
Monosulcites	palisadus	The Naze	Pollen	Monocotyledonae	
Monosulcites	spp.	The Naze	Pollen	Monocotyledonae	
Myricipites	harrisii	The Naze	Pollen	Myricaceae	
Myrtaceidites	spp.	Seymour Island	Pollen	Myrtaceae	
Nothofagidites	americanus	The Naze	Pollen	Nothofagaceae (cf. Nothofagus)	Extant Nothofagus specimen
Nothofagidites	cf. lachlaniae	Seymour Island	Pollen	Nothofagaceae (cf. Nothofagus)	Extant Nothofagus specimen
Nothofagidites	cf. nanus	Seymour Island	Pollen	Nothofagaceae (cf. Nothofagus)	Extant Nothofagus specimen
Nothofagidites	dorotensis	Seymour Island; The Naze	Pollen	Nothofagaceae (cf. Nothofagus)	Extant Nothofagus specimen
Nothofagidites	saraensis	The Naze	Pollen	Nothofagaceae (cf. Nothofagus)	Extant Nothofagus specimen
Nothofagidites	senectus	Seymour Island	Pollen	Nothofagaceae (cf. Nothofagus)	Extant Nothofagus specimen
Nothofagidites	sp. 3	Seymour Island	Pollen	Nothofagaceae (cf. Nothofagus)	Extant Nothofagus specimen
Nothofagidites	spp.	Seymour Island	Pollen	Nothofagaceae (cf. Nothofagus)	Extant Nothofagus specimen
Nothofagoxylon	N. scalariforme	Seymour Island	Wood	Nothofagaceae (Nothofagus)	Extant Nothofagus specimen
Nothofagus	N. "sp. 1"	Vega Island	Fossil leaves	Nothofagaceae	Extant Nothofagus specimen
Peninsulapollis	askiniae	The Naze	Pollen	Proteaceae	
Peninsulapollis	gillii	Seymour Island; The Naze	Pollen	Proteaceae (cf. Beauprea)	
Peninsulapollis	sp.	Seymour Island	Pollen	Proteaceae (cf. Beauprea)	
Peninsulapollis	truswelliae	Seymour Island	Pollen	Proteaceae (cf. Beauprea?)	
Periporopollenites	polyoratus	The Naze	Pollen	Proteaceae	
Polycolpites	langstonii	Seymour Island	Pollen	Pedaliaceae (cf. Josephinia)	
Propylipolis	pseudomoides	Seymour Island	Pollen	Proteaceae (cf. Carnarvonia?)	Carnarvonia
Propylipolis	reticuloscabratus	Seymour Island	Pollen	Proteaceae (cf. Grevilleoideae)	Carnarvonia
Propylipolis	sp. 1	Seymour Island	Pollen	Proteaceae	Carnarvonia
Propylipolis	sp. aff. P. amolosexinus	Seymour Island	Pollen	Proteaceae	
Proteacidites	parvus	The Naze	Pollen	Proteaceae (cf. Bellendena montana)	Bellendena
Proteacidites	scaboratus	The Naze	Pollen	Proteaceae (cf. Bellendena montana)	Bellendena
Proteacidites	sp. 2	Seymour Island	Pollen	Proteaceae	Bellendena
Proteacidites	spp.	Seymour Island	Pollen	Proteaceae	Bellendena
Proteacidites	tenuiexinus	The Naze	Pollen	Proteaceae	Bellendena
Psilatricolporites	sp. C	Seymour Island	Pollen	Dicotyledonae	
Quadraplanus	brossus	Seymour Island	Pollen	Dicotyledonae	
Rousea	georgensis	Seymour Island	Pollen	Dicotyledonae	
Simpsonipollis	sp.	Seymour Island	Pollen	Dicotyledonae	
Spinitricolpites	sp.	Seymour Island	Pollen	Dicotyledonae	
Stellidiopollis	annulatus	Seymour Island	Pollen	Dicotyledonae	
Stellidiopollis	sp.	Seymour Island	Pollen	Dicotyledonae	
Striatricolporites	sp. D	Seymour Island	Pollen	Dicotyledonae	
Tetracolporites	verrucosus	Seymour Island	Pollen	Dicotyledonae	
Tricolpites	confessus	The Naze	Pollen	Gunneraceae	Gunnera
Tricolpites	reticulatus	Seymour Island	Pollen	Gunneraceae (cf. Gunnera)	Gunnera
Tricolpites	sp. L	Seymour Island	Pollen	Gunneraceae	Gunnera
Tricolpites	pachyexinus	Seymour Island	Pollen	Gunneraceae	Gunnera
Tricolpites	sp. M	Seymour Island	Pollen	Gunneraceae	Gunnera
Tricolpites	spp.	Seymour Island	Pollen	Gunneraceae	Gunnera
Triorites	orbiculatus	The Naze	Pollen	Dicotyledonae	
Triporopollenites	sectilis	Seymour Island	Pollen	Proteaceae	
Triporopollenites	spp.	Seymour Island	Pollen	Proteaceae	
Tubulifloridites	lilliei	Seymour Island	Pollen	Asteraceae (cf. Dasyphyllum)	Dasyphyllum
Winteroxylon	jamesrossi	Eastern side of Lachman Crags	Wood	Winteraceae	

== See also ==
- Chorrillo Formation
- Dorotea Formation
- List of fossiliferous stratigraphic units in Antarctica
- List of dinosaur-bearing rock formations
- López de Bertodano Formation
- Sobral Formation
- South Polar region of the Cretaceous
