= Sobral Formation =

Paleontological formation in Antarctica

- Stratigraphic range: Danian; ~66–61.6 Ma
- Type: Geological formation
- Unit of: Marambio Group
- Underlies: Cross Valley & La Meseta Formations
- Overlies: López de Bertodano Formation
- Thickness: 250 m (820 ft)

Lithology
- Primary: Siltstone, mudstone
- Other: Concretion, sandstone

Location
- Coordinates: 64.3°S 56.7°W
- Approximate paleocoordinates: 63.2°S 66.6°W
- Region: Seymour Island, James Ross Island group
- Country: Antarctica
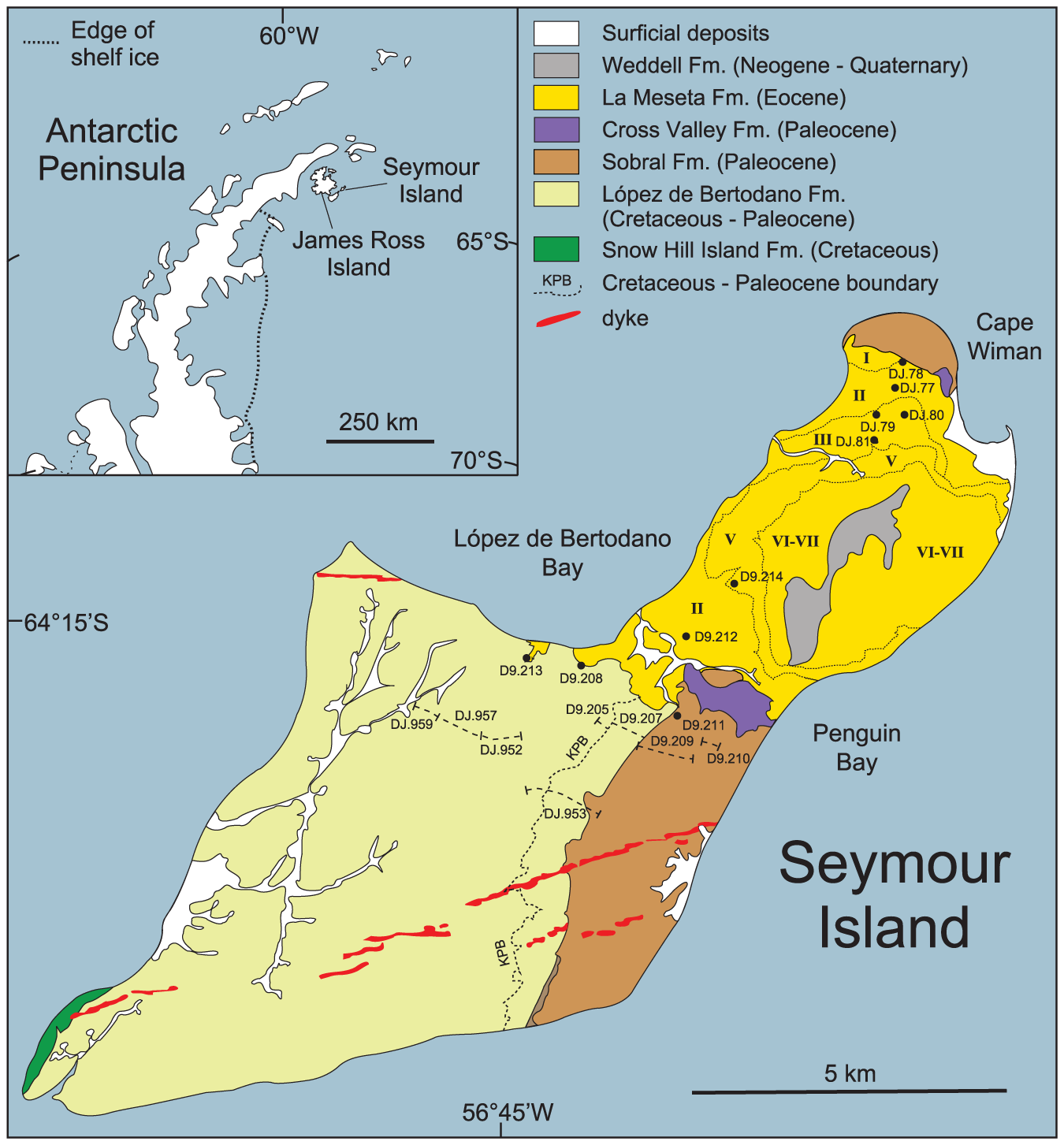
- Geologic map of Seymour Island, Antarctica with the Sobral Formation in brown

The Sobral Formation is a palaeontological formation located in Antarctica. It dates to the Danian stage of the Lower Paleocene period.

Spectacular fossils documenting marine and terrestrial ecosystems soon after the (non-avian) dinosaurs became extinct at the Cretaceous-Paleogene boundary are found in this formation. One of the most significant sites is on Seymour Island.

== See also ==
- List of fossiliferous stratigraphic units in Antarctica
- List of fossil sites
