= Notidanodon =

Notidanodon Temporal range: Tithonian–Thanetian

Scientific classification
- Kingdom: Animalia
- Phylum: Chordata
- Class: Chondrichthyes
- Subclass: Elasmobranchii
- Division: Selachii
- Order: Hexanchiformes
- Family: Hexanchidae
- Genus: †Notidanodon; Cappetta, 1975

Species
- N. pectinatus; N. lanceolatus

Extinct genus of Cow shark

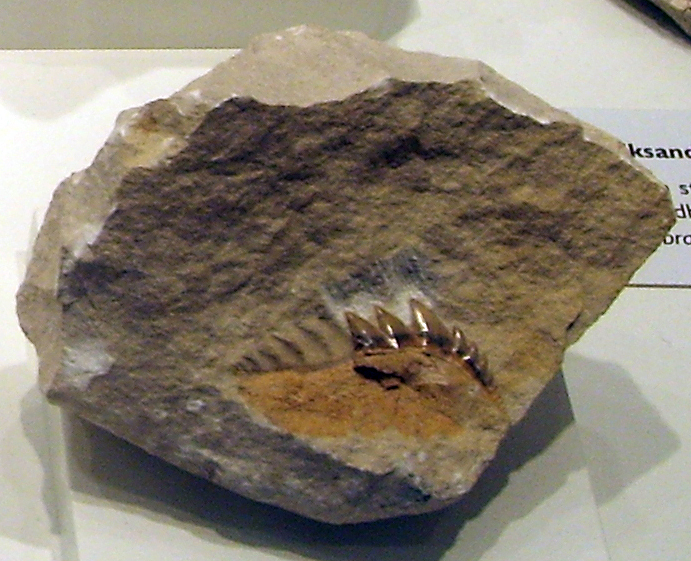
Notidanodon sp. fossil at the Geological Museum, Copenhagen.

Notidanodon is an extinct genus of cow shark. Fossils ascribed to this genus are known from the Jurassic and Cretaceous periods. Recently, the genus underwent a major revision and was split into two after the erection of Xampylodon to accommodate the species X. dentatus, X. loozi, and X. brotzeni. The genus is now known only from New Zealand, Antarctica, Africa, and South America.

== Species ==
The earliest occurrences of attributed specimens are from the Tithonian of New Zealand, and the latest are from the Maastrichtian of Antarctica. Currently, only two Mesozoic species, Notidanodon pectinatus and Notidanodon lanceolatus, are attributed to the genus. A putative third species, Notidanodon antarcti, appears only in the caption of Figure 2 in Grande and Chatterjee (1987), but the same material was treated as Notidanodon sp. in the main text. Later, N. antarcti was considered a nomen dubium and regarded as a junior synonym of Notidanodon pectinatus.
