= Seymour Island =

Island in Antarctica

- Location of Seymour Island

- Location in Antarctica Seymour Island (Antarctica)

Geography
- Location: Antarctica
- Coordinates: 64°14′S 56°37′W
- Archipelago: James Ross Island group

Administration
- Administered under the Antarctic Treaty System

Demographics
- Population: 0

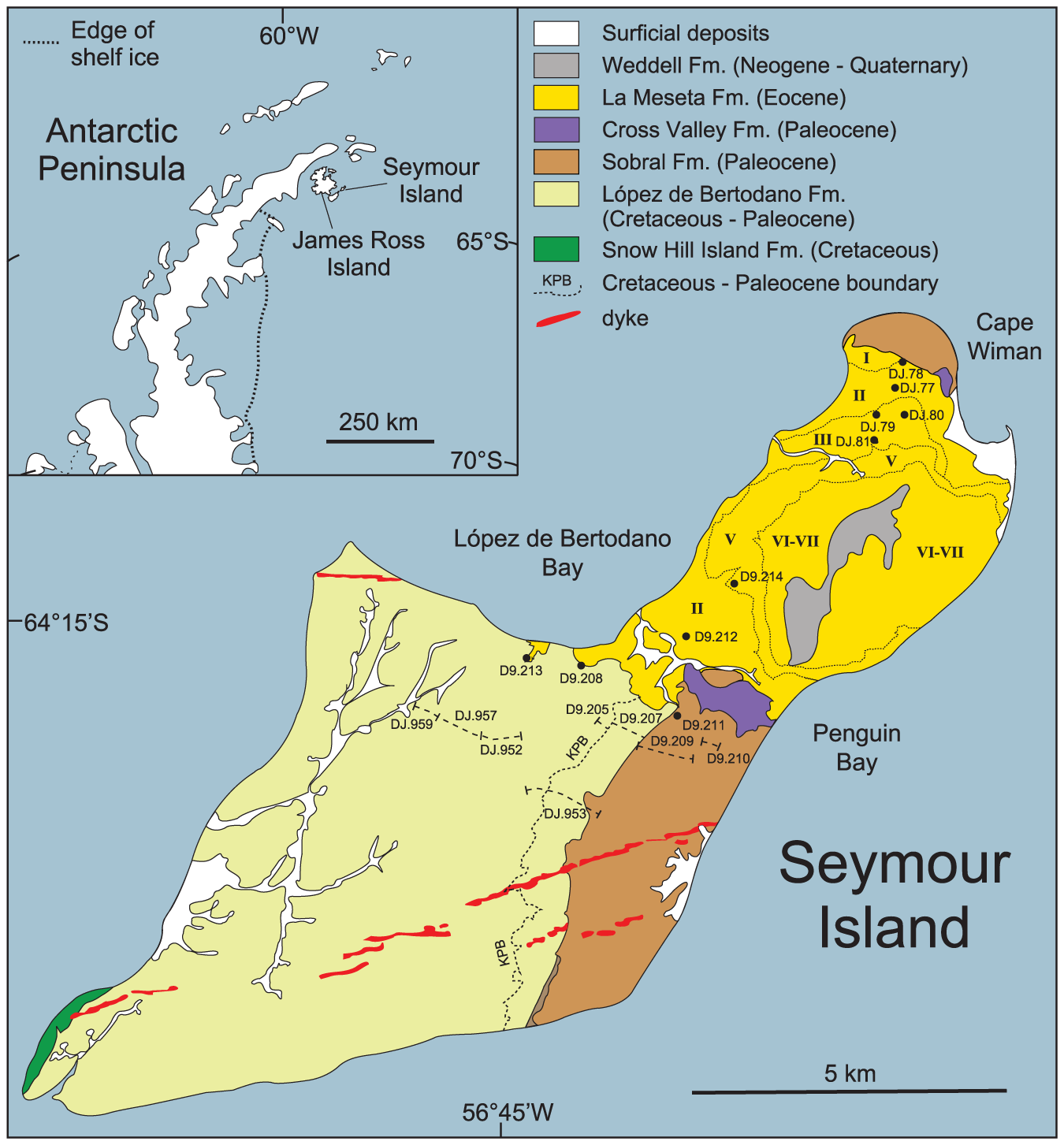
Geologic map of Seymour Island, Antarctica

Seymour Island or Marambio Island, is an island in the chain of 16 major islands around the tip of the Graham Land on the Antarctic Peninsula. Graham Land is the closest part of Antarctica to South America. It lies within the section of the island chain that resides off the east side of the peninsula's northernmost tip. Within that section, it is separated from Snow Hill Island by Picnic Passage, and sits just east of the larger key, James Ross Island, and its smaller, neighboring island, Vega Island.

Seymour Island is sometimes called Marambio Island or Seymour-Marambio Island, taking its resident Argentine base as its namesake (see section, Base Antárctica Marambio, below).

== Sailing directions ==
The US Defense Mapping Agency's Sailing Directions for Antarctica (1976) describes Seymour Island as follows:

Seymour Island lies northeastward of Snow Hill Island, from which it is separated by a strait about 1 mile wide. Strong currents and tide rips exist in this channel which shoals to less than 1.8mi (1 nm) in the center of the channel at low tide. The bottom deepens steeply on the northwestern side of the channel. The Island is 8 miles long and about 4 miles wide opposite Bodman Point (Cape Bodman) on the northwestern coast; the ends on the island are about 2 miles wide. It is entirely snow-free and of remarkable appearance. The northern portion of the island is a high, level, extensive plateau which reaches an elevation of 591 feet. Below this smooth plateau are terraces containing valleys and small irregular knolls of hard rock.

A transverse valley, the bottom of which is not much above sea level, cuts through the island from east to west. This valley opens into Papua Beach (Penguin Bay) on the eastern shore, and into an unnamed bay on the opposite shore east of Bodman Point. From Papua Beach to the northeastern extremity of the island runs a strip of deeply diffracted land. The southwestern portion of the island offers an appearance in marked contrast with the smooth surface of the northern portion. The southern half of the island has a peculiar ribbed appearance, being low and deeply dissected with many low hills between the erosive lines. Low perpendicular rock cliffs border the shore line but there are many landing places where the gorges slope gradually to the sea.

A depot of provisions was placed by Nordenskjold in 1903 at a cairn in the valley behind Penguin Bay.

== Historic site ==
A wooden plaque and rock cairn stand at Penguins Bay, on the southern coast of Seymour Island. The plaque was placed on 10 November 1903 by the crew of the Argentinian Corvette Uruguay on a mission to rescue the members of the Swedish expedition led by Otto Nordenskiöld. The cairn was erected in January 1990 by Argentina at the site of the plaque in commemoration of the same event. The site has been designated a Historic Site or Monument (HSM 60), following a proposal by Argentina to the Antarctic Treaty Consultative Meeting. The inscription on the plaque, placed where the two parties met, reads:

"10.XI.1903 Uruguay (Argentine Navy) in its journey to give assistance to the Swedish Antarctic expedition".

== Base Antárctica Marambio ==
Located in the island is the Marambio Base which is the main Argentine base in Antarctica operating an airfield (ICAO SAWB) for wheeled landing the whole year. In winter the base has an average of 55 crew members, but in summer the population of the base can grow to 180.

== Climate ==
The average temperatures on Seymour Island, as measured at Base Antárctica Marambio, are 1 °C (33.8 °F) during the summer and −21 °C (−5.8 °F) during the winter. In the wintertime, however, strong winds can lower the wind chill temperature feeling to as low as −60 °C (−76 °F) on exposed skin. On 9 February 2020, a temperature of 20.75 °C (69.3 °F) was recorded on the island. However, on 1 July 2021, the World Meteorological Organization invalidated the reading because based on the analysis of the data, the air temperature was recorded in non-standard conditions, leading to bias and errors in the temperature sensor and readings.

== Paleontological significance ==
The rocks making up Seymour Island date mainly from the Late Cretaceous to the Eocene. Successively younger rock formations found on the island are the López de Bertodano Formation (Cretaceous to early Paleocene), Sobral Formation and Cross Valley Formation (Paleocene) and La Meseta Formation (Eocene). Seymour Island has been referred to as the Rosetta Stone of Antarctic palaeontology, due to the unparalleled insight it provides into the geological and palaeontological history of the continent.

In December 1892 when Norwegian Captain, Carl Anton Larsen landed his ship, the Jason, on Seymour Island, he returned with more than maps of the territory, he found fossils of long-extinct species. Larsen's trip aboard the Jason was significantly more successful than his Swedish Antarctic Expedition journey between 1901 and 1904. During that trip, his ship, the Antarctic, was crushed and sunk by icebergs, and he and his crew were forced to weather fourteen months on the neighboring Snow Hill Island, surviving on penguins and seals. Ever since his voyage on the Jason, the island has been the subject of paleontological study.

The Cretaceous-Paleogene boundary (K-Pg) crops out on Seymour Island in the upper levels of the López de Bertodano Formation. A small (but significant) iridium anomaly occurs at the boundary on Seymour Island, as at lower latitudes, thought to be fallout from the Chicxulub impactor in the Gulf of Mexico. Directly above the boundary a layer of disarticulated fish fossils occurs, victims of a disturbed ecosystem immediately following the impact event. Multiple reports have described evidence for climatic changes in Antarctica prior to the mass extinction, but the extent to which these affected marine biodiversity is debated. Based on extensive marine fossil collections from Seymour Island, recent work has confirmed that a single and severe mass extinction event occurred at this time in Antarctica just as at lower latitudes.

Seymour Island has also been the site of much study of the Eocene Epoch of climatic cooling, a process that culminated in the initiation of Antarctic glaciation. Studies of the fine fraction carbonate from sites in the Southern Ocean suggest that, rather than a monotonic decrease in temperature over the Eocene Epoch, the middle of the epoch was punctuated by a brief duration of warming (Bohaty and Zachos, 2003).

Seymour Island has been a site of study of many fossils from this particular part of the Eocene Epoch, during which there was a more flourishing ecosystem with diverse biota as a result of the warmer climate. A diverse array of fossilized species has been studied on the island, including extinct penguin species (such as Palaeeudyptes klekowskii, Archaeospheniscus wimani and giant Anthropornis), various species in the bivalvia class and various types of flora and fauna, including a frog.

A fossil marsupial of the extinct family Polydolopidae was found on Seymour Island in 1982. This was the first evidence of land mammals having lived in Antarctica. Further fossils have subsequently been found, including members of the marsupial orders Didelphimorphia (opossum) and Microbiotheria, as well as ungulates and a member of the enigmatic extinct order Gondwanatheria, possibly Sudamerica ameghinoi.

=== IUGS geological heritage site ===
In respect of the site being the 'most representative high latitude K-Pg boundary location and one of the most significant and best exposed globally' the 'Cretaceous-Paleogene Transition at Seymour (Marambio) Island' was included by the International Union of Geological Sciences (IUGS) in its assemblage of 100 'geological heritage sites' around the world in a listing published in October 2022. The organisation defines an 'IUGS Geological Heritage Site' as 'a key place with geological elements and/or processes of international scientific relevance, used as a reference, and/or with a substantial contribution to the development of geological sciences through history.'

== Western features ==
Western features, from south to north, include:

=== Cape Lamas ===
64°19′S 56°54′W. The southwest point of Seymour Island. The cape was named by the command of the Argentine ship Chiriguano of the Argentine Antarctic Expedition, 1953-54, after Guardiamarina (Midshipman) Lamas, of the Argentine Navy, who died aboard the trawler Fournier off Tierra del Fuego in September 1949.

=== Fossil Bight ===
64°18′S 56°52′W. A shallow recession in the north coast of Seymour Island, 1 nautical mile (1.9 km; 1.2 mi) north-northeast of Cape Lamas. The feature was called "Fossil Bay" or "Bahia Fósiles" by United States Antarctic Research Program (USARP) and Argentine researchers because of fossils found here in 1982. The generic term bight is considered appropriate to this feature

=== Larga Valley ===
64°17′S 56°49′W. A valley 2 nautical miles (3.7 km; 2.3 mi) long, trending northeast-southwest in the west part of Seymour Island. The feature was descriptively named "Quebrada Larga" (long valley) in Argentine geological reports and maps of 1978. The term valley has been substituted in place of "quebrada" in the approved name.

=== Bodman Point ===
64°14′S 56°48′W. Rocky point which is situated centrally on the northwest coast of Seymour Island in the James Ross Island group. First surveyed by the Swedish Antarctic Expedition (SwedAE) under Otto Nordenskjöld, 1901-04, who named it Cape Bodman after Doctor Gosta Bodman, hydrographer and meteorologist with the expedition. Resurveyed by the Falkland Islands Dependencies Survey (FIDS) in 1952. Point is considered a more suitable descriptive term for this feature than cape.

=== Bertodano Bay ===
64°15′S 56°44′W. A bay between Bodman Point and Cape Wiman on the north side of Seymour Island. The name appears on Argentine navy charts from 1957 and recalls J. López de Bertodano, chief engineer in the Argentine corvette Uruguay during the rescue of the shipwrecked SwedAE in 1903.

== Eastern features ==
Eastern features, from south to north, include:

=== Penguin Point ===
64°19′S 56°43′W. A point located centrally along the south shore of Seymour Island. The point was possibly seen in 1843 by a British expedition under James Clark Ross, and was roughly charted by Captain Carl Anton Larsen who landed on the island in 1892 and 1893. Recharted by the SwedAE under Otto Nordenskjöld, 1901-04, who so named it because a large penguin colony was found there.

=== Blackrock Ridge ===
64°17′S 56°43′W. A ridge of exposed dark rock trending west-southwest – east.northeast, located 1.5 nautical miles (2.8 km; 1.7 mi) north of Penguin Point in central Seymour Island. The descriptive name "Filo Negro" (black ridge) was applied to this feature in Argentine geological reports on the island in 1978. The approved name, jointly recommended by the United States Advisory Committee on Antarctic Names (US-ACAN) and the UK Antarctic Place-Names Committee (UK-APC) in 1991, avoids duplication with Black Ridge in the Deep Freeze Range.

=== Cross Valley ===
64°16′S 56°42′W. A valley 2 nautical miles (3.7 km; 2.3 mi) long in a northwest–southeast direction, cutting through the mid-part of Seymour Island. Discovered by the SwedAE under Otto Nordenskjöld, 1901-04, and named Querthal (cross valley) because of the transverse alignment of the valley.

=== Penguin Bight ===
64°16′S 56°39′W. A bight on the southeast coast of Seymour Island, northward of Penguin Point. The feature was named "Pinguinbucht" (Penguin Bay) from the large penguin rookery observed there by the SwedAE, 1901-04. The term bight is considered appropriate for this feature.

=== Cape Wiman ===
64°13′S 56°38′W. A low, rocky cape marking the north extremity of Seymour Island. Probably first seen by Sir James Clark Ross in January 1843, but the cape was not adequately surveyed until 1902-03 when the Swedish expedition under Otto Nordenskjöld wintered in the area. Named by UK-APC after C. Wiman, who worked on the Seymour Island fossils collected by the Swedish expedition.

=== Oviedo Cove ===
64°13′S 56°35′W. A cove at the northeast end of Seymour Island, southeast of Cape Wiman. The cove was named "Caleta Oviedo" in 1979 after an Argentine sailor who died in the Antarctic. Applied by the names commission, Argentine Ministry of Defense.

== See also ==
- Snow Hill Island Formation
- Composite Antarctic Gazetteer
- List of Antarctic islands south of 60° S
- SCAR
- Territorial claims in Antarctica

== Sources ==
- Alberts, Fred G., ed. (1995), Geographic Names of the Antarctic (PDF) (2 ed.), United States Board on Geographic Names This article incorporates public domain material from websites or documents of the United States Board on Geographic Names.
- Sailing Directions for Antarctica: Includes Islands South of Latitude 60.̊, United States. Defense Mapping Agency. Hydrographic Center, 1976 This article incorporates public domain material from websites or documents of the National Geospatial-Intelligence Agency.
