= 2026 in archosaur paleontology =

Fossil archosaur research published in 2026 includes the description of new taxa, as well as other peer-reviewed publications on discoveries related to archosaur paleontology.

== Pseudosuchians ==
=== New pseudosuchian taxa ===
Name	Novelty	Status	Authors	Age	Type locality	Country	Notes	Images
Antusuchus	Gen. et sp. nov	Valid	Fernandez-Dumont et al.	Early Cretaceous (Albian)	Candeleros Formation	Argentina	A member of the family Peirosauridae. Genus includes new species A. rionegrinus.	
Carinthiasuchus	Gen. et sp. nov	Valid	Dalla Vecchia & Cau	Triassic (Ladinian-Carnian)	Partnach Formation	Austria	A member of Poposauroidea. The type species is C. kandutschi.	
Crocodylus lucivenator	Sp. nov	Valid	Brochu et al.	Pliocene	Hadar Formation	Ethiopia	A crocodile, a species of Crocodylus.	
Ctenosuchus	Gen. et sp. nov	Valid	Imran et al.	Middle Jurassic (Bathonian)	Anoual Formation	Morocco	A member of the family Teleosauridae. The type species is C. tenuidens.	
Eosphorosuchus	Gen. et sp. nov		Margulis-Ohnuma et al.	Late Triassic (Rhaetian)	Chinle Formation	United States (New Mexico)	An early member of Crocodylomorpha. The type species is E. lacrimosa.	
Galahadosuchus	Gen. et sp. nov	Valid	Bodenham et al.	Late Triassic (Carnian–Rhaetian)	Cromhall Quarry	United Kingdom	A member of Crocodylomorpha belonging to the family Saltoposuchidae. The type species is G. jonesi.	
Herugavialis	Gen. et comb. nov	Valid	Burke et al.	Middle Miocene	Mokattam Formation	Egypt	A member of Gavialoidea. The type species is Tomistoma cairense (Müller, 1927).	
Indosinosuchus peninsularensis	Sp. nov	Valid	Lauprasert et al.	Middle-Late Jurassic	Khlong Min Formation	Thailand	A member of the family Teleosauridae.	
Labrujasuchus	Gen. et sp. nov		Turner et al.	Late Triassic (Norian)	Chinle Formation	United States (New Mexico)	A member of Poposauroidea belonging to the family Shuvosauridae. The type species is L. expectatus.	
Mandrasuchus	Gen. et sp. nov		Lessner et al.	Paleocene (Danian)	Denver Formation	United States (Colorado)	A member of the family Alligatoridae. Genus includes new species M. milleri.	
Shakajlura	Gen. et sp. nov	Valid	Cardillo et al.	Triassic (Ladinian-Carnian)	Chañares Formation	Argentina	Probably an early-diverging member of Paracrocodylomorpha. The type species is S. riojanensis.	
Sonselasuchus	Gen. et sp. nov	Valid	Smith & Sidor	Late Triassic (Norian)	Chinle Formation	United States (Arizona)	A member of Poposauroidea belonging to the family Shuvosauridae. The type species is S. cedrus.	

=== General pseudosuchian research ===
- Evidence interpreted as indicative of overall climatic niche conservatism of non-marine pseudosuchians throughout their evolutionary history is presented by Chiarenza et al. (2026), who also report evidence of persistence of habitats that were climatically suitable for these archosaurs throughout all but the most extreme scenarios of the Cretaceous–Paleogene extinction event, providing a possibility for survival of crocodylomorphs in low-latitude refugia.
- Evidence from the study of the histology of appendicular elements of Saurosuchus galilei, Sillosuchus longicervix, Aetobarbakinoides brasiliensis, Aetosauroides scagliai, Gracilisuchus stipanicicorum, Tarjadia ruthae and Riojasuchus tenuisceps, indicative of diversity of growth rates of the studied pseudosuchians, is presented by Ponce, Cerda & Desojo (2026).
- Terras et al. (2026) compare the cranial morphology of Triassic pseudosuchians and other reptiles (including dinosaurs), and argue that cranial similarities among pseudosuchians and other reptiles do not necessarily reflect functional similarities.
- Evidence from the study of the histology of long bones of the holotype specimen of Dynamosuchus collisensis, interpreted as indicative of a sustained rapid growth, is presented by Farias et al. (2026).
- Ulloa-Guaiquin et al. (2026) study the neurovascular anatomy of the snout of Riojasuchus tenuisceps, interpreted as consistent with presence of sensory system similar to those seen in extant crocodilians and birds, and supporting a wading-foraging behavior of the studied ornithosuchid.
- A new specimen of Postosuchus cf. kirkpatricki, comparable in size to the holotype of this species, is described from the strata of the Chinle Formation from the Petrified Forest National Park (Arizona, United States) by Marsh et al. (2026).
- Hutchinson et al. (2026) study the locomotor biomechanics of Postosuchus kirkpatricki, reporting conflicting evidence for its possible stance and gait.

=== Aetosaur research ===
- Probable aetosaur dermal impressions are reported from the Upper Triassic New Haven Formation (Connecticut, United States) by Ben-Salahuddin, Hyatt & Brinkman (2026).
- Haldar & Ray (2026) study the osteoderm histology of Venkatasuchus armatum.

=== Crocodylomorph research ===
- Revision of the fossil record of Early Jurassic to Pliocene crocodyliform eggs and nests is published by Panades, Galobart & Sellés (2026).
- Paixão et al. (2026) describe isolated eggshells and egg clutches from the Upper Cretaceous Adamantina Formation (Brazil) with the egg arrangement similar to those seen in extant crocodilians, including an assemblage of at least 47 eggs representing the largest Mesozoic crocodyliform egg clutch reported to date.
- Redescription of "Erythrochampsa" longipes is published by Weiss et al. (2026), who consider the studied taxon to be a nomen dubium, and interpret its holotype as likely to be fossil material of a member or a relative of the genus Protosuchus.
- Tan et al. (2026) describe new fossil material of Edentosuchus tienshanensis from the Lower Cretaceous Lianmuqin Formation (Xinjiang, China), providing new information on the morphology of members of this species.
- Soni et al. (2026) study the sensory evolution in thalattosuchians on the basis of data from digital endocranial reconstructions, reporting evidence of proportional scaling of visual structures with skull size of members of the group, and interpret metriorhynchids as maintaining visual reliance.
- Barrientos-Lara & Alvarado-Ortega (2026) report the first discovery of geosaurine fossil material from marine deposits of the Upper Jurassic (Kimmeridgian) Sabinal Formation (Oaxaca, Mexico).
- Pellarin et al. (2026) report evidence indicating that frontoparietal fossae in the skull of Thalattosuchus superciliosus were exceptionally well-developed compared to similar fossae of semi-aquatic crocodylomorphs, and interpret this difference as possibly resulting from adaptation of T. superciliosus to surface basking necessary for cranial heat transfer.
- Hua & Tabouelle (2026) identify a skull of a member of the genus Metriorhynchus from the Kimmeridgian strata from Cap de la Hève (Normandy, France) as belonging to a member of the species M. palpebrosus, and consider the species Metriorhynchus hastifer to be a junior synonym of the species Metriorhynchus brevirostris.
- Herrera, Spindler & Bronzati (2026) redescribe the anatomy and study the phylogenetic affinities of Dakosaurus maximus on the basis of data from a new specimen from the Kimmeridgian Torleite Formation (Germany), and report evidence of preservation of cartilaginous fish (likely hybodontiform) remains within the abdominal cavity of the studied individual.
- Paiva et al. (2026) provide new estimates of body length of 40 notosuchian species, and report discrepancies between estimates based on skull length and those based on femoral length.
- Candeiro et al. (2026) describe a tooth of one of the largest sphagesaurian specimens reported to date from the Upper Cretaceous Adamantina Formation in the Goiás state, representing the first notosuchian record from mid-west Brazil.
- Navarro et al. (2026) study the bone histology of Yacarerani boliviensis, and interpret it as consistent with fast growth dynamics with periods of decline.
- Kitayama & Bertini (2026) interpret Armadillosuchus arrudai and Caryonosuchus pricei as probable junior synonyms of Sphagesaurus huenei.
- Carneiro et al. (2026) identify probable sebecid tooth marks on a dentary of Didelphopsis sp. from the Eocene strata from the Itaboraí Basin (Brazil), interpreted as produced during head-shaking and defleshing of the carcass by the predator, and interpret sebecids as likely killing small mammals in a manner similar to extant monitor lizards.
- Ruiz et al. (2026) present a digital reconstruction of the mandible of Sahitisuchus fluminensis, restore the original morphology of the fractured mandible of the holotype specimen, and report evidence of utility of repaired mandible for identification of morphological characters with significance in phylogenetic studies.
- Description of the internal rostral anatomy of Sebecus ayrampu is published by Bravo, Barrios & Pol (2026).
- The first formal description of crocodyliform fossil material from the Upper Jurassic-Lower Cretaceous Missão Velha Formation (Brazil), interpreted as belonging to indeterminate neosuchians, is published by Albuquerque et al. (2026).
- Castillo-Visa et al. (2026) report evidence of preservation of cartilaginous and epidermal tissues in a specimen of Montsecosuchus depereti from the Barremian strata from Spain.
- Jouve et al. (2026) provide phylogenetic definitions for Tethysuchia and its subgroups that are valid under the PhyloCode, and coin a new name Stenorhynchosuchia for the putative clade including Tethysuchia and Thalattosuchia.
- Barbini et al. (2026) provide new information on the internal cranial anatomy of Pholidosaurus purbeckensis, reporting evidence of greater similarity of the endocranial anatomy to that of goniopholidids than dyrosaurids, and evidence of presence of possible osteological correlates of nasal salt glands.
- A study on the histology of teeth of Guarinisuchus munizi, providing evidence of variable rates of dentine deposition, is published by Izidio et al. (2026).
- Szegszárdi, Ősi & Rabi (2026) describe a new partial skull of Doratodon carcharidens from the Santonian Csehbánya Formation (Hungary), reinterpret this species as a paralligatorid, and reinterpret Ogresuchus furatus as a neosuchian likely to be an atoposaurid.
- Redescription of the anatomy and a study on the phylogenetic affinities of Koumpiodontosuchus aprosdokiti is published by Barker et al. (2026), who support the placement of the studied species within Bernissartiidae.
- Prondvai et al. (2026) report evidence of Hunter-Schreger band-like patterns in the tooth enamel of Iharkutosuchus (interpreted as differing in structural origin from Hunter-Schreger bands of mammals), as well as evidence of wavy enamel in the studied crocodyliform (a feature also known in ornithopod dinosaurs), interpreted as likely adaptations to a herbivorous diet and high-efficiency chewing.
- Redescription and a study on the affinities of Thoracosaurus isorhynchus is published by Boerman et al. (2026).
- Boerman et al. (2026) reconstruct the endocranial cavities of Thoracosaurus isorhynchus and Eothoracosaurus mississippiensis, and interpret their anatomy as consistent with marine ecology and lack of capability of deep diving.
- Donzé et al. (2026) describe the morphology of endocranial structures of Leidyosuchus canadensis and Stangerochampsa mccabei.
- Bateman, Demers-Potvin & Larsson (2026) compare reconstructed jaw adductor musculature and feeding performances of Leidyosuchus canadensis and Champsosaurus lindoei, interpreted as suggestive of dietary resource partitioning between the two taxa.
- Lindblad et al. (2026) describe two new crocodyliform specimens from the Paleocene strata of the Ravenscrag Formation (Saskatchewan, Canada), including the first member of the genus Boverisuchus from the middle-late Paleocene of Saskatchewan and a specimen with probable alligatorid affinities.
- Redescription of the anatomy of the postcranial skeleton of Boverisuchus vorax is published by Iijima & Tomiya (2026).
- Taxonomic revision of the genus Diplocynodon is published by Walter et al. (2026).
- Martin et al. (2026) report the discovery of fossil material of Diplocynodon sp. from the Oligocene strata in central Turkey, representing one of the easternmost records of the genus reported to date.
- Burke & Mannion (2026) study the diversity of endocranial anatomy in extant and extinct crocodylians and basal eusuchians, reporting evidence of anatomical differences facilitating the identification of members of distinct lineages.
- Cidade et al. (2026) revise the phylogenetic nomenclature of Caimaninae, defining new clades Bottosauria, Caimanini, Purussauria and Purussauridae.
- A study on the bone histology of mekosuchines, interpreted as indicative of a more terrestrial habit compared to extant crocodylians and of an extended period of moderate growth, is published by Hoffman et al. (2026).
- Agne et al. (2026) identify the extinct crocodile population from Seychelles as representing the westernmost known population of saltwater crocodiles on the basis of analysis of mitochondrial genomes.
- Puncture marks interpreted as evidence of predation by a crocodylian (likely Purussaurus) are reported in bones of Pericotoxodon platignathus, Xenastrapotherium kraglievichi and Granastrapotherium snorki from the Miocene strata from La Venta (Colombia) by Wilson et al. (2026), who also report additional traces on bones of X. kraglievichi that might be evidence of scavenging by a crocodyliform similar to Langstonia.
- Review of the fossil record of late Quaternary crocodilians from Australasia is published by Ristevski et al. (2026).
- Fernandez Blanco & Bona (2026) report evidence from the study of extant and extinct crocodyliforms indicative of similarities of embryonic development of skulls of extant caimans to changes in palate and skull roof during the evolutionary history of crocodyliforms.

== Non-avian dinosaurs ==
=== New dinosaur taxa ===
Name	Novelty	Status	Authors	Age	Type locality	Country	Notes	Images
Bicharracosaurus	Gen. et sp. nov	Valid	Reutter et al.	Late Jurassic (Oxfordian-Kimmeridgian)	Cañadón Calcáreo Formation	Argentina	A macronarian sauropod. The type species is B. dionidei.	
Ceratocaudia	Gen. et sp. nov	Valid	Natarajan et al.	Jurassic (Pliensbachian to Bajocian)	Kaladongar Formation	India	A macronarian sauropod. The type species is C. antiqua.	
Changzhousaurus	Gen. et sp. nov	Valid	Xu	Early Cretaceous (Aptian)	Jiufotang Formation	China	A pennaraptoran theropod with an unusual mosaic of features; possibly an early-diverging deinonychosaurian. The type species is C. sinensis.	
Cryptarcus	Gen. et comb. nov	Valid	Holmes et al.	Late Cretaceous (Campanian)	Dinosaur Park Formation	Canada (Alberta)	A chasmosaurine ceratopsid; a new genus for "Chasmosaurus" russelli Sternberg (1940).	
Dasosaurus	Gen. et sp. nov	Valid	Mayer et al.	Early Cretaceous (Aptian)	Itapecuru Formation	Brazil	A sauropod belonging to the group Somphospondyli. The type species is D. tocantinensis.	
Dinevenator	Gen. et comb. nov	Valid	Jasinski & Sullivan	Late Cretaceous (Campanian)	Kirtland Formation	United States (New Mexico)	A troodontid theropod; a new genus for "Saurornitholestes" (or Xenovenator?) robustus Sullivan (2006).	
Doolysaurus	Gen. et sp. nov	Valid	Jung et al.	Cretaceous (Albian–Cenomanian)	Ilseongsan Formation	South Korea	A thescelosaurid ornithischian. The type species is D. huhmini.	
Eopinacosaurus	Gen. et comb. nov	Valid	Penkalski	Late Cretaceous	Bayan Mandahu Formation	China; Mongolia	An ankylosaurid; a new genus for "Pinacosaurus" mephistocephalus Godefroit et al. (1999).	
Ferenceratops	Gen. et comb. nov	Valid	Maidment et al.	Late Cretaceous (Maastrichtian)	Sânpetru and Densuș-Ciula formations	Romania	A ceratopsian. The type species is the 'rhabdodontid' "Zalmoxes" shqiperorum Weishampel et al. (2003).	
Foskeia	Gen. et sp. nov	Valid	Dieudonné et al.	Early Cretaceous (Barremian–Aptian)	Castrillo de la Reina Formation	Spain	A rhabdodontomorph ornithopod. The type species is F. pelendonum.	
Gilmoretyrannus	Gen. et comb. nov	-	Sancarlo & Paul	Late Cretaceous (Maastrichtian)	Lance and Hell Creek formations	United States (Montana; Wyoming)	A tyrannosauroid theropod. The type species is Nanotyrannus lethaeus Zanno & Napoli (2025).	
Gongshuilong	Gen. et sp. nov	Valid	Yao et al.	Late Cretaceous	Lianhe Formation	China	A saurolophine hadrosaurid belonging to the tribe Brachylophosaurini. The type species is G. fanwei.	
Haolong	Gen. et sp. nov	Valid	Huang et al.	Early Cretaceous (Barremian)	Yixian Formation	China	An iguanodontian ornithopod. The type species is H. dongi.	
Infernogallus	Gen. et sp. nov	Valid	Funston et al.	Late Cretaceous (Maastrichtian)	Hell Creek Formation	United States (Montana; North Dakota; South Dakota)	A caenagnathid theropod. The type species is I. jamesi.	
Invictibellatrix	Gen. et sp. nov	Valid	Morrison et al.	Early Cretaceous (Barremian)	Wessex Formation	United Kingdom	A megaraptoran theropod. The type species is I. amberina.	
Jian	Gen. et sp. nov	Valid	Zhou et al.	Early Cretaceous (Aptian)	Xiagou Formation	China	A microraptorine dromaeosaurid. The type species is J. changmaensis.	
Kank	Gen. et sp. nov	Valid	Motta et al.	Late Cretaceous (Maastrichtian)	Chorrillo Formation	Argentina	A unenlagiid theropod. The type species is K. australis.	
Kayrasaurus	Gen. et sp. nov	Valid	Liao et al.	Early Cretaceous	Yixian Formation	China	An early-diverging member of the group Therizinosauria. The type species is K. changliensis.	
Kryptohadros	Gen. et sp. nov	Valid	Magyar et al.	Late Cretaceous (Maastrichtian)	Densuș-Ciula Formation	Romania	A hadrosauroid ornithopod. The type species is K. kallaiae.	
Larsonvenator	Gen. et sp. nov	-	Sancarlo & Paul	Late Cretaceous (Maastrichtian)	Hell Creek Formation	United States (Montana)	A tyrannosauroid theropod. The type species is L. elegans.	
Mesetasaurus	Gen. et sp. nov	Valid	Soto Núñez, Montenegro & Perea	Late Cretaceous	Guichón Formation	Uruguay	A titanosaur belonging to the group Aeolosaurini. The type species is M. protector.	
Musango	Gen. et sp. nov	Valid	Barrett et al.	Late Triassic (Norian)	Pebbly Arkose Formation	Zimbabwe	A sauropodomorph belonging to the family Unaysauridae. The type species is M. matusadonaensis.	
Nagatitan	Gen. et sp. nov	Valid	Sethapanichsakul et al.	Early Cretaceous (Aptian–Albian)	Khok Kruat Formation	Thailand	A euhelopodid macronarian sauropod. The type species is N. chaiyaphumensis.	
Nipponopelta	Gen. et sp. nov	In press	Oyabu et al.	Late Cretaceous (Cenomanian)	Hikagenosawa Formation	Japan	A member of the family Nodosauridae. The type species is N. yezoensis.	
Norellraptor	Gen. et sp. nov	Valid	Wang et al.	Early Cretaceous (Barremian–Aptian)	Jiufotang Formation	China	A microraptorine dromaeosaurid. The type species is N. barsboldi.	
Nyana	Gen. et sp. nov	Valid	Moopen et al.	Late Triassic (Norian–Rhaetian)	Elliot Formation	South Africa	A massopodan sauropodomorph. The type species is N. rooiwalensis.	
Paludohadros	Gen. et sp. nov	Valid	Sacamoto et al.	Early Cretaceous (Barremian)	Weald Clay	United Kingdom	A hadrosauroid ornithopod. The type species is P. proudlovii.	
Phosphatotitan	Gen. et sp. nov	Valid	Longrich et al.	Late Cretaceous (Maastrichtian)	Ouled Abdoun Basin	Morocco	A titanosaur sauropod. The type species is P. khouribgaensis.	
Pinacosaurus hilwitnorum	Sp. nov	Valid	Penkalski	Late Cretaceous	Djadochta Formation	Mongolia	An ankylosaurid; a species of Pinacosaurus.	
Plesiolophus	Gen. et sp. nov	Valid	McFeeters et al.	Late Cretaceous (Campanian)	Oldman Formation	Canada (Alberta)	A lambeosaurine hadrosaurid belonging to the tribe Parasaurolophini. The type species is P. warnerensis.	
Ptychotherates	Gen. et sp. nov	Valid	Srivastava & Nesbitt	Late Triassic (Norian or Rhaetian)	Chinle Formation	United States (New Mexico)	A saurischian in the novel clade Morphoraptora. The type species is P. bucculentus.	
Rinconraptor	Gen. et sp. nov	Valid	Méndez et al.	Late Cretaceous (Santonian)	Bajo de la Carpa Formation	Argentina	A megaraptorid theropod. The type species is R. pipoae.	
Spinosaurus mirabilis	Sp. nov	Valid	Sereno et al.	Late Cretaceous (Cenomanian)	Farak Formation	Niger	A spinosaurid theropod; a species of Spinosaurus.	
Tromerosaurus	Gen. et sp. nov	Valid	Powers et al.	Late Cretaceous	Oldman Formation	Canada (Alberta)	An albertosaurine tyrannosaurid. The type species is T. solumons.	
Uragasaurus	Gen. et sp. nov	Valid	Nilpanapan et al.	Late Jurassic	Phu Kradung Formation	Thailand	A mamenchisaurid sauropod. The type species is U. kalasinensis.	
Xenovenator	Gen. et sp. nov	Valid	Rivera-Sylva et al.	Late Cretaceous (Campanian)	Cerro del Pueblo Formation	Mexico	A troodontid theropod. The type species is X. espinosai.	
Xiangyunloong	Gen. et sp. nov	Valid	Hu et al.	Early Jurassic	Fengjiahe Formation	China	A massopodan sauropodomorph. The type species is X. fengming.	
Yantaloong	Gen. et sp. nov	Valid	Zhang et al.	Middle Jurassic	Zhanghe Formation	China	A eusauropod with possible turiasaur affinities. The type species is Y. lini.	
Yeneen	Gen. et sp. nov	Valid	Filippi et al.	Late Cretaceous (Santonian)	Bajo de la Carpa Formation	Argentina	A titanosaur sauropod. The type species is Y. houssayi.	

=== General non-avian dinosaur research ===
- Review of preceding studies and of methods used to study dinosaur biology and evolution is published by Xu et al. (2026).
- Henderson (2026) determines rates of discovery of new dinosaur taxa and changes geographical origin of new discoveries throughout the history of the study of the group.
- Brownstein & Griffin (2026) reconstruct early evolutionary history of dinosaurs, placing the emergence of the group between 251.2 and 230 million years ago, and reporting evidence of a burst of rapid morphological evolution in the Middle to early Late Triassic that coincided with emergence of major dinosaurian subgroups (Ornithischia, Sauropodomorpha and Theropoda).
- Müller (2026) reviews the discoveries of Triassic dinosaurs and their relatives from the Santa Maria Supersequence (Brazil) from preceding years, documenting the origin and early diversification of dinosaurs.
- Fonseca et al. (2026) reconstruct the evolution of the morphology of the axial skeleton in early dinosaurs.
- Aureliano et al. (2026) compare the microstructure of appendicular bones in non-avian dinosaurs and large-bodied mammals, and interpret it as indicating that gigantism was achieved through divergent evolutionary pathways in the two groups.
- Wilson et al. (2026) study the evolution of the body size of Mesozoic dinosaurs, finding no evidence of a correlation between body size and climatic conditions before or after shifts in preferred climatic niches.
- Saitta (2026) argues that models of growth in dinosaurs used in studies from preceding years may be underfit, failing to account for possible causes variation between specimens other than ontogeny.
- Evidence of limited range of motion of fingers of Camarasaurus and Stegosaurus is presented by Senter (2026).
- Evidence from the study of extant birds and crocodylians, interpreted as indicating that gastrolith shape is a reliable proxy for diet and stomach muscularity in extinct dinosaurs, is presented by Takasaki et al. (2026).
- Forster et al. (2026) provide evidence from the study of fossils from coastal and interior upland ecosystems preserved in Cretaceous formations from North America interpreted as indicating that elevated δ^{13}C values of skeletal materials of dinosaurs and other vertebrates from their ecosystems might be related to consumption of marine-derived organic matter (including marine macroalgae and plants) by dinosaurs and other animals from coastal environments.
- Regalado Fernández (2026) develops a function that enables estimates of phylogenetic informativeness of fossil specimens and its relation to skeletal completeness, and applies it to the fossil record of dinosaurs from Mexico.
- Review of factors influencing the formation of dinosaur tracks is published by Falkingham & Gatesy (2026).
- Hartmann et al. (2026) provide a method for recognizing patterns of shape variation differentiating dinosaur tracks with the use of unsupervised machine learning, and use it to study affinities of controversial dinosaur tracks, reporting evidence of small, three-toed, bird-like footprints from the Triassic and Early Jurassic falling within the bird-dominated region of morphospace, and evidence of some Middle Jurassic tridactyl tracks from the Isle of Skye (Scotland, United Kingdom) grouping with ornithopods rather than with theropods.
- Ha & Kim (2026) present a new automated system for detection of dinosaur tracks across diverse tracksites and preservation conditions.
- Peng & Xing (2026) review the utility of new analytical tools for reevaluation of long-standing hypotheses in dinosaur ichnology, and argue that not all tridactyl tracks can be assigned to either theropod or ornithopod trackmakers solely on the basis of footprint shape, that parallel trackways increase the probability of group movement of sauropods but do not concusively prove it, and that Triassic and Early Jurassic tracks with bird-like morphology do not conclusively prove an early origin of birds.
- Granata et al. (2026) report evidence of impact of erosion on preservation of dinosaur tracks from the Carnian strata of the Lerici ichnosite in Italy (the type locality of Evazoum sirigui).
- Licht et al. (2026) provide a new temporal framework for dinosaur assemblages from the Khorat Plateau (Thailand), reporting evidence of a Pliensbachian age of the Nam Phong Formation, Kimmeridgian to early Berriasian age of the Phu Kradung Formation, Hauterivian–Barremian age of the Sao Khua Formation and the Aptian–Albian age of the Phu Phan Formation and the Khok Kruat Formation.
- Ait Haddou et al. (2026) report the discovery of new tracksites preserving theropod and quadrupedal dinosaur (possibly stegosaur or sauropod) tracks from the strata of the Jurassic Tilougguit and Guettioua formations (Morocco).
- Evidence indicating that theropod and ornithopod tracks from the Middle Jurassic strata in the Tizi N'Talghemt area (Morocco) were originally left on tidal flats during low tide points is presented by El Ouali et al. (2026).
- DePolo et al. (2026) study the dinosaur tracks from the Middle Jurassic sauropod-dominated Duntulm tracksite from the Isle of Skye (Scotland, United Kingdom), finding no definitive evidence of gregarious behavior of sauropods from the study, and revise the fossil record of dinosaur tracks from the Isle of Skye, reporting possible evidence of different environmental preferences of sauropods and other dinosaurs.
- Tracks of sauropods, probable ankylosaurs and undetermined bipedal dinosaurs preserved in aeolian depositional setting are described from the Hauterivian strata of the Agrio Formation (Argentina) by Heredia et al. (2026).
- Ornithischian and theropod (possibly including large dromaeosaurid) tracks are described from the Lower Cretaceous strata of the Serra do Tucano Formation (Brazil) by Barros et al. (2026).
- Rubio-Nieto et al. (2026) interpret ornithopod and theropod trace fossils from the Barremian-Aptian strata from the Las Peñas Amarillas site (Enciso Group, Spain) as produced in an area with a shallow carbonate lake subject to lake-level changes, and interpret the studied traces as providing possible evidence of gregarious behavior of tracemakers.
- A new assemblage of ornithopod (representing two distinct ichnotaxa), sauropod and theropod tracks is described from the Aptian-Albian strata of the Matoushan Formation at the Huashiban tracksite (Yunnan, China) by Xu et al. (2026).
- An ornithopod-dominated track assemblage, also including ankylosaurid and theropod tracks, is described from the Coniacian strata of the Marshybank Formation (British Columbia, Canada) by Plint & Helm (2026).
- Choi et al. (2026) identify dinosaur eggs assigned to at least two distinct oogenera (Macroelongatoolithus and Mosaicoolithus) from the Cenomanian strata of the Dadaepo Formation (South Korea).
- Evidence indicating that dinosaur eggs from the Upper Cretaceous strata of the Wido Volcanics (Wi Island, South Korea) assigned to the ootaxon Propagoolithus widoensis were laid in nests established before the igneous intrusion rather than in a rock that was already metamorphosed as a result of volcanic activity is presented by Kim et al. (2026).
- He et al. (2026) describe a dinosaur egg and eggshells from the Upper Cretaceous Xuannan Formation (Anhui, China), representing the first ovaloolithid record from the Nanling Basin, and name a new ootaxon Ovaloolithus nanlingensis.
- Luo et al. (2026) describe a near-complete dinosaur (possibly hadrosaur) egg and eggshells fragments from the Upper Cretaceous Guifeng Group (Jiangxi, China), name a new ichnotaxon Stromatoolithus yuduensis, transfer the Early Cretaceous ootaxon Guegoolithus turolensis to the oogenus Stromatoolithus, and name a new oofamily Stromatoolithidae.
- Cardozo et al. (2026) report the discovery of faveoloolithid eggshells from the late Maastrichtian strata of the Lago Colhué Huapí Formation (Argentina), originating from strata with abundant hadrosaurid remains and no sauropod remains reported to date, and expanding known geographic distribution of Faveoloolithidae in South America.
- Pantelides et al. (2026) present a new mechanistic energetic model for the studies of the capability of terrestrial vertebrates for transoceanic dispersal, apply it to extant vertebrates, Lambeosaurus and Rapetosaurus, and interpret their findings as suggestive of feasibility of dispersal of hadrosaurs and titanosaurs between Africa and Europe through the oceanic corridor separating Iberia from Morocco during the Cretaceous.
- Evidence of Albian age of dinosaur-rich Candeleros and Huincul formations (Argentina) is presented by Maniel et al. (2026).
- Dai et al. (2026) study the stratigraphy and palaeoenvironmental features of the strata of the Zhengyang Formation (Chongqing, China) preserving fossils of Late Cretaceous dinosaurs, interpreted as living in a restricted intermountain basin.
- Torrent, Parra & Sellés (2026) study the taphonomy of a partial tail of a lambeosaurine hadrosaurid from the Maastrichtian strata from the Planta del Mestre locality (Tremp Basin, Spain), reporting evidence of feeding or scavenging by a theropod with ziphodont teeth (possibly an abelisaurid).
- Wyenberg-Henzler, Tanke & Brown (2026) revise the fossil record of tooth marks on hadrosaurid jugals from Upper Cretaceous formations in Alberta (Canada), reporting evidence of slightly higher frequency of tooth marks compared to their frequency in disarticulated hadrosaur bones in general.
- A study on perforations on bones of specimens of Edmontosaurus annectens from an extensive Maastrichtian bonebed from the Lance Formation (Wyoming, United States) is published by Siviero et al. (2026), who report that only a small fraction of the studied bones preserves perforations that can be confidently identified as tooth traces, most likely produced peri- or postmortem by Tyrannosaurus rex.
- Snyder et al. (2026) study the taphonomy of dinosaur fossils from the strata of the Lance Formation at Hanson Ranch (Wyoming, United States), and interpret the preservation and alignment of the studied fossil remains as likely resulting from stranding of floating corpses on the shoreline of the Western Interior Seaway.
- Roberts et al. (2026) study the stratigraphy and age of the strata of the Hell Creek Formation from the excavation site of the "Dueling Dinosaurs", from other locations on the Murray Ranch and from the McGinnis Butte section (Montana, United States), and determine the age of the "Dueling Dinosaurs" locality to be approximately 66.895 million years.
- Wyenberg-Henzler & Scannella (2026) study a skull of Edmontosaurus from the Hell Creek Formation (Montana, United States) with a tyrannosaurid tooth embedded in the nasal around the time of death of the hadrosaurid, interpreted as likely resulting from a bite to the snout of Edmontosaurus during a predation attempt.
- López-Isla et al. (2026) document dinosaur track-bearing levels of the Maastrichtian strata at the Huichaira site (Yacoraite Formation, Argentina), preserving tracks of large hadrosaurids and theropod-like tracks.
- Han et al. (2026) study the hydrodynamic evolution of the Shanyang Basin (China) during the latest Cretaceous, reporting evidence of reduction of suitable nesting habitats of dinosaurs before the Cretaceous–Paleogene extinction event.
- A study on the fossil record of non-mammalian vertebrates from the Cretaceous-Paleogene transition of the Ferris Formation (Wyoming, United States) is published by Wroblewski (2026), who places the local Cretaceous-Paleogene boundary 50 m above the previous proposed location, and reports evidence of decrease of recorded diversity of dinosaurs during the latest Maastrichtian that might have either taphonomical or biological causes.

=== Saurischian research ===
- Müller (2026) describes new herrerasaur fossil material from the Upper Triassic strata of the Santa Maria Formation (Brazil), providing evidence of persistence of members of this group in the studied area after the transition from rhynchosaur-dominated assemblages to ones dominated by traversodontid cynodonts.
- Pawlak et al. (2026) identify lungfish aestivation burrows in the Triassic strata of the Ørsted Dal Formation (Greenland), interpreted as indicative of a seasonally dry climate in the studied area during the late Norian, and indicating that aridity was not a barrier for dispersal of theropods and sauropodomorphs living in the studied area at the time.
- Menkem et al. (2026) study the sedimentary setting of sauropod and theropod tracks (including a footprint of a large-bodied theropod) from the Lower Cretaceous (Berriasian–Hauterivian) strata of the Koum Basin (Cameroon), and report evidence of shared ichnological and sedimentological traits with tracksites of similar age from northeastern Brazil, interpreted as consistent with existence of a dispersal corridor linking West Africa and South America before the full opening of the Atlantic Ocean.
- A new assemblage of sauropod and theropod tracks is described from the Lower Cretaceous (Barremian–Aptian) strata of the Shinekhudag Formation (Mongolia) by Mainbayar et al. (2026).

==== Theropod research ====
- Boisvert et al. (2026) compare the median size classes of ceratosaurians, megalosauroids, allosauroids, megaraptorans, and tyrannosauroids throughout the Jurassic and Cretaceous periods, and report evidence of a higher median number of missing size classes in tyrannosauroid-dominated ecosystems compared to allosauroid/megalosauroid-dominated ones.
- A study on the skull biomechanics and likely feeding behaviors of members of diverse theropod subgroups, with a focus on tyrannosauroids, is published by Johnson-Ransom et al. (2026).
- Hendrickx (2026) explores the evolution of the dentition in non-coelurosaur theropods (e.g.,Ceratosauria, Megalosauroidea, and Allosauroidea).
- Reolid et al. (2026) provide a morphometric comparison of the skull features of Allosaurus fragilis, Giganotosaurus carolinii and Tyrannosaurus rex, and report evidence of differences interpreted as consistent with different feeding strategies.
- Evidence from the study of teeth of Allosaurus fragilis, Ceratosaurus dentisulcatus, Irritator challengeri and Tyrannosaurus rex, indicating that tooth position is one of the factors affecting microwear texture in theropod teeth, is presented by Morrison et al. (2026).
- Marques et al. (2026) present an automated computer-vision workflow for generation of standardized silhouettes of theropod teeth from their photographs, and report evidence of its utility for clustering of isolated teeth of Late Jurassic theropods from the Alcobaça Formation (Portugal) into morphometric groups.
- Pereyra (2026) compares the evolution of maxillary shape and size in medium-sized and large abelisaurids, carcharodontosaurs and coelurosaurs, reporting evidence of different adaptive responses to ecological and environmental pressures in the studied groups.
- Evidence from the study of furcular development in embryos of extant birds including the Chilean tinamou, interpreted as indicative of a composite origin of the theropod furcula from clavicles and the interclavicle, is presented by Jiménez-Villalón et al. (2026).
- Scherer, Steell & Upchurch (2026) report evidence of different patterns of forelimb reduction in at least five distinct theropod lineages, as well as evidence of correlation of forelimb reduction with cranial robusticity and gigantism (itself likely linked to the increased size of prey animals), and interpret forelimb reduction in theropods as likely linked to redundancy of forelimbs in prey capture.
- Evidence from elliptic Fourier analysis of pedal phalanx bones of North American tyrannosaurids, ornithomimids, caenagnathids and troodontids, indicating that theropod pedal phalanges can be identified down to the family level on the basis of the study of their morphology, is presented by Warnock-Juteau, Smith & Cullen (2026).
- Drzewiecki et al. (2026) interpret theropod tracks from the Lower Jurassic East Berlin Formation (Connecticut, United States) as produced in an area with an ephemeral lake system rather than at the margin of a perennial lake.
- Xing et al. (2026) report the discovery of new theropod fossil material from the Lower Jurassic Fengjiahe Formation (Yunnan, China), including a tooth of a theropod distinct from Sinosaurus and two morphotypes of theropod tracks.
- Lallensack et al. (2026) reevaluate factors influencing shapes of theropod tracks from the Middle Jurassic of El Mers Group (Morocco) and from the Lower Cretaceous Cameros Basin (Spain), and interpret the type ichnospecies of the ichnogenera Saurexallopus, Magnoavipes, Theroplantigrada, Ordexallopus and Archaeornithipus as nomina dubia.
- Dridi (2026) reports the discovery of new theropod tracks from the Callovian strata of the El Miit Member of the Foum Tataouine Formation (Tunisia), providing evidence of more persistent presence of theropods in the studied area throughout the Jurassic than indicated by earlier discoveries.
- Gesualdi et al. (2026) assign a theropod trackway from the Tithonian strata from the Plagne tracksite (France) to the ichnospecies Megalosauripus transjuranicus, extending the known geographical range of this ichnotaxon.
- Grallatorid tracks representing two morphotypes, associated with microbial mats that might have contributed to the formation and preservation of the tracks, are identified in the strata of the Tuchengzi Formation from the Jurassic-Cretaceous transition (Hebei, China) by Xing et al. (2026).
- Rodríguez-de la Rosa et al. (2026) report the discovery of a small theropod resting trace from the Lower Cretaceous Hualhuani Formation (Peru).
- Evidence from the study of theropod footprints from the Lower Cretaceous Enciso Group (Spain), indicating that differences in morphology of the studied footprints reflect distinct phases of running involving different foot postures and load distributions, is presented by Díaz-Martínez et al. (2026).
- Theropod tracks representing two distinct morphotypes, including tracks providing possible evidence of gregarious behavior of ornithomimosaurs, are described from the Cretaceous Chaochuan Formation (Zhejiang, China) by Zheng et al. (2026).
- A neotheropod vertebra representing the oldest record of a dinosaur from the Iberian Peninsula reported to date is described from the Upper Triassic (Carnian-Norian) strata of the Silves Group (Portugal) by Santos-Matos & Mateus (2026).
- Charles, Polet & Hutchinson (2026) reconstruct the optimal jumping performance of Coelophysis bauri as overall similar to that of extant elegant crested tinamou, but achieved through different joint kinematics and muscle work throughout the hindlimbs, and report evidence of potential impact of the long, mobile tail on jumping performance.
- Redescription of the skeletal anatomy and a study on the affinities of Panguraptor lufengensis is published by Zhang et al. (2026).
- A new non-averostran theropod specimen distinct from Sinosaurus, preserved with evidence of presence of tetanuran-like skeletal characters, is described from the Lower Jurassic Lufeng Formation (Yunnan, China) by Wang et al. (2026), who also name the new clade Averostriformes that includes all neotheropods more closely related to Allosaurus fragilis than to Coelophysis bauri.
- Oswald & Curtice (2026) report evidence of similarities between the morphometrics of teeth of Ceratosaurus and upper canines of machairodontines, and argue that the dentition of the former might have been an adaptation to quick-killing middle-sized prey.
- Rowe, Cerroni & Rayfield (2026) study mechanical performance of skulls of Ceratosaurus, Masiakasaurus, Carnotaurus and Majungasaurus, and report evidence of adaptations of skulls of large abelisaurs to resist feeding-induced loads, suggestive of similarity of ecological roles of abelisaurs and tyrannosaurs, as well as possible evidence of adaptation of Masiakasaurus to capture of small prey.
- Seculi Pereyra et al. (2026) review the history of studies on abelisaurid phylogeny and provide recommendations for future studies.
- Evidence indicating that the abelisaurid fossil record is in part influenced by sampling biases but also preserves genuine signals of changes of diversity of this group is provided by Aspromonte, Cerroni & Pol (2026).
- Seculi Pereyra (2026) studies the evolution of abelisaurid orbit shape, interpreted as more likely influenced by selective pressures such as those related to specialized predation than by phylogenetic constraints.
- Seculi Pereyra, Soto & Perez (2026) study the evolution of skull ornamentation in abelisaurids, interpreted as following directional patterns and possibly driven by sexual selection.
- Evidence of impact of ecological pressures on the evolution of the skull shape in abelisaurids, and of rapid morphological evolution of abelisaurid skulls under strong constraints, is presented by Seculi Pereyra et al. (2026).
- Probable teeth of majungasaurine abelisaurids from the Cenomanian strata of the Algora site (Province of Guadalajara, Spain) are identified by López-Miguel et al. (2026).
- Boschetto et al. (2026) describe an abelisaurid tooth from the Upper Cretaceous (Campanian-Maastrichtian) Argiles et Grès à Reptiles Formation (France), preserved with a bite mark interpreted as most likely self-inflicted during carcass consumption.
- Description of the anatomy of the skull of Skorpiovenator bustingorryi is published by Canale et al. (2026).
- Valdéz et al. (2026) report evidence of polycamerate internal structure and an advanced degree of pneumaticity in the fifth cervical vertebra of Viavenator exxoni.
- Pradelli et al. (2026) describe the anatomy of the axial skeleton of Piatnitzkysaurus floresi.
- Li et al. (2026) report the discovery of an isolated theropod tooth from the Lower Cretaceous Lianmuqin Formation (China), interpreted as evidence indicating that, in addition to Kelmayisaurus petrolicus and small coelurosaurs, the theropod assemblage from the studied formation also included a medium-sized tetanuran.
- The most complete specimen of Torvosaurus tanneri reported to date, providing new information on the anatomy of members of this species, is described from the Brushy Basin Member of the Morrison Formation (Colorado, United States) by Warner-Cowgill et al. (2026), who interpret T. gurneyi as a junior synonym of T. tanneri.
- A study on the biogeography of spinosaurids and other megalosauroids throughout their evolutionary history, providing evidence of a least two dispersals of spinosaurids from Europe into Gondwana, is published by Lewis et al. (2026).
- A study on the skull anatomy of spinosaurids, providing evidence of the presence of osteological correlates of supraorbitally placed salt glands similar to but evolved independently from salt glands seen in birds, is published by Cau et al. (2026).
- Evidence from the study of the neurovascular system in spinosaurid premaxillae, interpreted as consistent with sensitivity of spinosaurid snouts and high rate of tooth replacement in members of the group, is presented by Pittet (2026).
- Buffetaut et al. (2026) report evidence of the presence of two morphotypes of spinosaurid teeth in the Lower Cretaceous strata from the Phra Prong locality (Thailand), including a morphotype with no enamel ribbing, and interpret the studied teeth as indicative of the coexistence of at least two spinosaurid taxa at this locality.
- An isolated theropod tooth with possible metriacanthosaurid affinities is reported from the Upper Jurassic–Lower Cretaceous strata of the Phu Kradung Formation (Thailand) by Samathi, Suteethorn & Suteethorn (2026).
- Malafaia, Maggia & Rauhut (2026) describe a maxilla of a hatchling Allosaurus from the Upper Jurassic strata from the Guimarota coal mine (Portugal) with a corrosion pattern interpreted as caused by digestion, most likely resulting from consumption by a non-avian theropod.
- Two partial braincases of Siamraptor suwati, providing new information on the cranial anatomy of the species, are described from the Lower Cretaceous Khok Kruat Formation (Thailand) by Hattori et al. (2026).
- A theropod tooth with morphological similarities to carcharodontosaurid teeth is described from the Upper Cretaceous (Cenomanian-Turonian) strata of the Zhoutian Formation (Jiangxi, China) by Yu et al. (2026).
- Seculi Pereyra & Ibiricu (2026) report evidence of coupled evolution of shape and size of manual claws of megaraptorids, and interpret the studied theropods as likely utilizing forelimbs in a specialized predation strategy.
- Aranciaga-Rolando (2026) links the increase of skeletal pneumaticity throughout the evolutionary history of megaraptorids to reduction of body mass in members of this group compared to theropods of comparable body size from other groups.
- A study on the pneumaticity of bones of the postcranial skeleton of Murusraptor barrosaensis is published by Zurriaguz, Baiano & Coria (2026).
- Grice et al. (2026) report evidence of preservation of microstructures that might be red blood cells, as well as heme-derived tetrapyrroles in those microstructures, in fossil material of Aratasaurus museunacionali.
- Zheng et al. (2026) use U-Pb dating methods to calibrate the evolution of Sinotyrannus kazuoensis.
- Nielsen et al. (2026) identify tooth marks on a tyrannosaurid metatarsal BDM 124 from the Judith River Formation (Montana, United States) as produced by a small-bodied, likely juvenile tyrannosaurid scavenging on a larger individual.
- McElvogue & Lehman (2026) describe tyrannosaur feeding traces on hadrosaur limb bones from the Aguja Formation (Texas, United States), interpreting the limbs as removed from the carcass to a separate feeding site, and interpreting the traces as indicative of a substantial effort to remove all flesh from ankles and feet.
- Wyenberg-Henzler & Tanke (2026) report evidence from the study of tooth marks on hadrosaurid vertebra from the Dinosaur Park Formation (Alberta, Canada) interpreted as indicative of links between distribution of tyrannosaurid tooth marks and distribution of soft tissues on hadrosaurid tails.
- Evidence of preservation of micro- and nanoscale histological features (including Haversian canal and lacunocanalicular network permineralization) in bones of Albertosaurus sarcophagus from the Horseshoe Canyon Formation (Alberta, Canada) is presented by Williams et al. (2026).
- Cranial remains of an immature Albertosaurus sarcophagus, preserved with unhealed tooth marks most likely left by a dromaeosaurid, are described from the Horseshoe Canyon Formation by Doyon et al. (2026).
- A natural mold of a partial rostrum of a juvenile specimen of Gorgosaurus libratus is described from the Campanian strata of the Wapiti Formation (British Columbia, Canada) by Coppock, Larsson & Currie (2026), extending the known geographical range of the species.
- Longrich et al. (2026) report the discovery of a tibia of a large-bodied tyrannosaurid from the Campanian strata of the Kirtland Formation (New Mexico, United States), interpreted as likely to be a bone of an early representative of Tyrannosaurini.
- Yun (2026) studies the affinities of the tyrannosaurid maxilla TMM 41436-1 from the Javelina Formation (Texas, United States), and interprets the available evidence as insufficient for placement of the studied specimen in a tyrannosaurid taxon distinct from Tyrannosaurus rex.
- Raun et al. (2026) revise proposed diagnostic characters of Asiatyrannus xui and Raptorex kriegsteini, and interpret the type material of both taxa as likely to be juvenile specimens of Tarbosaurus bataar.
- Woodward, Myhrvold & Horner (2026) reconstruct the life history of Tyrannosaurus on the basis of bone histology, reporting evidence of a more gradual annual growth rate slope than indicated by earlier studies and evidence of a protracted subadult stage, and find that growth trajectories of the tyrannosaur specimens BMRP 2002.4.1 (the holotype of Nanotyrannus lethaeus) and BMRP 2006.4.4 did not fit the T. rex growth curve model.
- Blanco, Luzardo-Vera & Yorio (2026) use a biomechanical model originally developed for assessment of injury risk of extant leopards while hunting by free-falling from trees to estimate the risk of injury that could be sustained by Tyrannosaurus colliding with Triceratops, and interpret the hunting strategy involving collision with Triceratops proposed by Krauss & Robinson (2013) as unlikely to be frequently used by Tyrannosaurus.
- A study on the locomotion of Tyrannosaurus, indicative of similarity of foot-strike patterns to those of the ostrich, is published by Boeye et al. (2026).
- Evidence of mid-Maastrichtian age of the holotype specimen of Tyrannosaurus mcraeensis is provided by Amato et al. (2026).
- A trackway including four large theropod tracks, likely produced by an adult Tyrannosaurus rex, is described from the Maastrichtian strata of the Hell Creek Formation (North Dakota, United States) by Falkingham et al. (2026).
- Flores et al. (2026) determine body temperatures of Tyrannosaurus rex from the Hell Creek Formation (Montana, United States) and contemporary crocodilians on the basis of the study of clumped isotopes from their tooth enamel, and report evidence that the body temperature of T. rex was higher than its environment and comparable to those of extant endotherms.
- Longrich et al. (2026) identify fossil material of hatchlings and young juveniles of Gorgosaurus libratus and Tyrannosaurus rex from the Upper Cretaceous formations in the United States and Canada, interpreted as indicative of small body size of tyrannosaurid hatchlings and their precociality; the authors also interpret tooth wear of hatchlings as indicating that they fed on relatively large vertebrates, and estimate that tyrannosaurids were capable of producing large clutches of eggs.
- New theropod vertebrae, including fossil material of a troodontid and a probable ornithomimosaurian, are described from the Upper Cretaceous Iren Dabasu Formation (China) by Xu et al. (2026), expanding known morphological diversity of theropod vertebrae from this formation.
- Arbour, Bullard & Evans (2026) report the discovery of an ornithomimosaur caudal vertebra from the Campanian Cedar District Formation, representing the first confirmed dinosaur record from outcrops of the Nanaimo Group in Canada and the second confirmed record of dinosaur fossil material from the Nanaimo Group overall.
- Calvo-Pérez & Cuesta (2026) study the neuroanatomy of the endocranial cavity of Pelecanimimus polyodon, and report evidence of similarity of endocranial morphology to those of other ornithomimosaurs.
- Libke et al. (2026) support the interpretation of isolated dentaries from the Upper Cretaceous Judith River Formation (Montana, United States) described by Chinzorig et al. (2025) as belonging to an aberrantly large ornithomimosaur, but argue that the studied fossils cannot be confidently assigned to a member of the family Deinocheiridae.
- A study on the bone histology and growth dynamics of Sinornithomimus dongi is published by Yan et al. (2026).
- Makovicky et al. (2026) report the discovery of a new specimen of Alnashetri cerropoliciensis from the Candeleros Formation (Argentina), providing new information on the anatomy of members of this species; the authors also interpret the Late Jurassic theropod vertebra described by Makovicky (1997), the theropod astragalus YPM 9163 from Como Bluff (Morrison Formation, Wyoming, United States; formerly referred to Coelurus fragilis) and Calamosaurus foxi as alvarezsauroids, and study the phylogenetic relationships and evolutionary history of members of this group, interpreting it as having Pangaean ancestral distribution.
- A study on the functional capacity of forelimbs of alvarezsauroids, supporting their adaptations for digging, is published by Leedham et al. (2026).
- Meso et al. (2026) redescribe the anatomy of the holotype specimen of Bonapartenykus ultimus.
- Wang et al. (2026) report the first discovery of a maniraptoran egg from the Cenomanian Quantou Formation (Jilin, China), and name a new ootaxon Jilinoolithus lamellotestus.
- The first clutch of non-avian dinosaur eggs from the Cretaceous Dengta Basin (Guangdong, China), assigned to the ootaxon Elongatoolithus elongatus, is described by Wang et al. (2026).
- A study on the biomechanics of the forelimbs of Falcarius is published by Smith (2026).
- Freimuth, Lively & Zanno (2026) reinterpret "Geminiraptor" suarezarum as a member of Therizinosauria and as a species belonging to the genus Falcarius.
- The longest three-dimensionally preserved Cretaceous pennaceous feather reported to date, preserving a combination of derived and primitive traits that likely resulted in a limited aerodynamic performance, and interpreted as probably originating from a pennaraptoran theropod, is described from the Cenomanian amber from Myanmar by Zhang et al. (2026).
- A nearly complete pes of a caudipterid oviraptorosaur that did not reach complete somatic maturity, providing new information on the anatomy of members of this group, is described from the Lower Cretaceous Yixian Formation (China) by Han et al. (2026).
- Description of the anatomy of the postcranial skeleton of Gigantoraptor erlianensis is published by Hao, Tan & Xu (2026).
- Description of the inner ear anatomy of Epichirostenotes curriei and two caenagnathid specimens from the Judith River and Hell Creek formations (Montana, United States) is published by Bazzana-Adams, Funston & Evans (2026).
- Hao & Xu (2026) describe a new caenagnathid specimen from the Upper Cretaceous Iren Dabasu Formation (Inner Mongolia, China), and refer both this specimen and the specimen originally described by Yao et al. (2015) to the species Caenagnathasia martinsoni, extending known geographical range of this species.
- Su et al. (2026) determine heat transfer during the incubation of a clutch of oviraptorid eggs on the basis of incubation experiments, and find that oviraptorid parents transferred heat to their eggs less efficiently than extant birds and depended in part on environmental heat sources for incubation.
- Hao & Xu (2026) report the discovery of a new nest-associated oviraptorid specimen from the Upper Cretaceous strata from Jiangxi (China), and interpret Huanansaurus ganzhouensis, Corythoraptor jacobsi and the new specimen as likely representing a single species.
- Fossil material of probable non-avialan members of Paraves, including parts of ulna and humerus that might belong to a single, approximately turkey-sized individual, is described from the Barremian Papo Seco Formation (Portugal) by Figueiredo et al. (2026).
- Hefler et al. (2026) study the aerodynamics of Microraptor during flight, reporting evidence of beneficial impact of forewing–hindwing interactions on flow dynamics.
- The first deinonychosaurian (probably troodontid) track from Japan is described from the Lower Cretaceous Kitadani Formation by Tsukiji, Hattori & Azuma (2026).
- A probable troodontid tooth with similarities to Troodon is described from the Upper Cretaceous strata of the Kallamedu Formation (India) by Dhiman et al. (2026).
- Yin et al. (2026) study the external and internal anatomy of two troodontid teeth from the Maastrichtian Yuliangzi Formation (Heilongjiang, China), including a new specimen with similarities to Troodon.
- A new postcranial skeleton of Sinovenator changii, providing new information on the anatomy of members of this species and extending their known geographical distribution, is described from the Lower Cretaceous strata of the Ningcheng Basin (Inner Mongolia, China) by Yu et al. (2026).
- Description of the pelvic and hindlimb anatomy of embryonic to skeletally mature troodontid specimens (possibly representing the species Troodon formosus) from the Upper Cretaceous Two Medicine Formation (Montana, United States) is published by Varricchio & Caldwell (2026).
- Serio et al. (2026) present a reconstruction of the forelimb of Troodon formosus, and reconstruct its range of motion.
- Review of evidence of troodontid dietary habits is published by Fan, Miller & Pittman (2026).
- Li et al. (2026) redescribe the holotype of Eosinopteryx brevipenna and interpret this species as a junior synonym of Anchiornis huxleyi.
- García-Gil et al. (2026) identify isolated theropod teeth from the Upper Cretaceous El Gallo Formation (Mexico) as belonging to dromaeosaurids, troodontids, maniraptorans of uncertain affinities and indeterminate theropods.

==== Sauropodomorph research ====
- Schuurman, Bruner & Knoll (2026) reconstruct the topology of skulls of 14 sauropodomorph species spanning the entire evolutionary history of the group, and report probable evidence of limitation of morphological changes of individual bones by spatial constraints.
- A study on the evolution of the humeral morphology of sauropodomorphs, providing evidence of different pattern of evolution of sauropod-like traits in the proximal and distal half of the humerus, is published by Lefebvre et al. (2026).
- A study on biomechanical properties of sauropodomorph femora, providing evidence that sauropod gigantism was made possible by diverse factors including changes of femoral geometry, internal bone architecture, posture and articular tissues that were specific to different lineages, is published by Silva Junior et al. (2026).
- Evidence from the study of the fossil record of sauropodomorph tracks, indicative of changes through time related to increase of body size in the morphology of the sauropodomorph manus (but not in the morphology of the pes), is presented by Yamaguchi, Kubo & Kubo (2026).
- Lyakhovetskii (2026) reports evidence from the study of sauropod trackways indicative of variability of stepping characteristics between the forelimbs and hindlimbs.
- Review of research on the sauropodomorph bone and tooth histology and their paleobiology from the preceding years is published by Cerda et al. (2026).
- A footprint and an associated tail trace that were probably produced by a bipedal sauropodomorph, representing the oldest dinosaur trace fossil from Australia reported to date, are described from the Carnian strata of the Aspley Formation in Queensland by Romilio & Runnegar (2026).
- D'Orazi Porchetti et al. (2026) assign tetradactyl footprints from the Carnian strata of the Hassberge Formation (Germany) to the ichnogenus Evazoum, and interpret the studied footprints as likely produced by bipedal sauropodomorphs.
- Campos et al. (2026) describe the fossil material and study the bone histology of a small-bodied, juvenile sauropodomorph from the Upper Triassic strata from the Cerro da Alemoa site (Santa Maria Formation, Brazil), representing the smallest well-preserved skeletal remains of a sauropodomorph from Brazil reported to date.
- The first Late Triassic sauropodomorph tracks from Southeast Asia reported to date are described from the Norian Huai Hin Lat Formation (Thailand) by Liard et al. (2026).
- Description of the anatomy of the axial skeleton and a study on the affinities of Macrocollum itaquii is published by Fonseca et al. (2026).
- Xing et al. (2026) report the discovery of probable sauropodomorph tracks from a new tracksite from the Upper Triassic Xujiahe Formation (Sichuan, China).
- Chen et al. (2026) determine the oldest sauropodomorph fossils from the Kunming Basin (Yunnan, China) to be 200.17-million-years-old, and interpret this result as evidence of colonization of low palaeolatitude area of southwest China by medium- to large-bodied dinosaurs in the aftermath of the Triassic–Jurassic extinction.
- Di et al. (2026) identify a sauropodomorph eggshell from the Lower Jurassic Lufeng Formation (Yunnan, China) preserving evidence of a soft-shelled structure, and name a new ootaxon Mutabilisoolithus dawaensis.
- Barbosa et al. (2026) study the relationship between cranial architecture and feeding performance in Yizhousaurus sunae, Diplodocus carnegii, Camarasaurus lentus and Sarmientosaurus musacchioi, providing evidence a broad diversification of the feeding apparatus in the studied taxa rather than a single, progressively improved feeding configuration.
- Review of evidence of cardiovascular biology of sauropod dinosaurs is published by Cortese-Krott & Isakson (2026).
- Aureliano et al. (2026) determine gravitational pressures on bones of the appendicular skeleton of sauropods, recovered as remaining below the theoretical fracture threshold.
- Evidence from the study of tooth morphology and replacement patterns, indicative of diverse feeding ecologies of Early Jurassic sauropods from the Cañadón Asfalto Basin (Argentina), is presented by Gomez, Carballido & Pol (2026).
- Ren et al. (2026) report the discovery of dorsal vertebrae of a large-bodied sauropod (possibly a basal neosauropod) from the Middle Jurassic (Aalenian) strata of the Xintiangou Formation (China).
- Mai et al. (2026) determine the sauropod-bearing strata of the Shaximiao Formation at Wangcang (Sichuan, China) to be approximately 164 million years old.
- Saleiro et al. (2026) present the workflow behind the creation of a large dataset of surface texture measurements of teeth of Late Jurassic sauropods.
- Chowchuvech et al. (2026) study the affinities of isolated sauropod teeth from the Khorat Group (Thailand), interpreted as indicative of a shift in composition of local sauropod assemblages across the Jurassic–Cretaceous.
- The largest sauropod tracksite from the Lower Cretaceous Madongshan Formation (Ningxia, China), preserving tracks with a morphology intermediate between those typical of Brontopodus and Parabrontopodus tracks, is described by Yang et al. (2026).
- Sauropod tracks produced in wet aeolian environmental, possibly while the trackmakers travelled towards a habitat with greater resource availability, are described from the Lower Cretaceous Três Barras Formation (Brazil) by Nascimento et al. (2026).
- Kubo et al. (2026) study tooth wear of a specimen of Omeisaurus maoianus, finding no evidence of significant differences of microwear texture in the same individual based on tooth position, and report evidence of tooth wear differences between Yunnanosaurus and derived sauropods that were likely related to dietary differences.
- Shui, Shao & Yin (2026) present the first three-dimensional reconstruction of a mamenchisaurid tooth based on data from a new specimen from the Upper Jurassic Qigu Formation (China), interpreted as likely representing a taxon distinct from the specimen reported by Maisch & Matzke (2019).
- A study on the bone histology of cervical ribs of a juvenile mamenchisaurid specimen from the Jurassic Shaximiao Formation (Sichuan, China) is published by Zhou et al. (2026).
- Ghosh et al. (2026) describe a probable turiasaur tooth from the Bathonian strata of the Jaisalmer Basin (India), interpreted as the oldest record of group from the Indian Subcontinent reported to date.
- Casts of sauropod teeth from a private quarry near Skull Creek in northwestern Colorado (United States) interpreted as the first record of a member of Turiasauria from the Upper Jurassic Morrison Formation are described by Foster, Woodruff & Royo-Torres (2026).
- Gouellec et al. (2026) study dental morphotypes in the turiasaur from the Angeac-Charente bonebed (France), reporting evidence of heterodonty.
- A study on the caudal vertebrae of Cetiosaurus sp., "Cetiosaurus" glymptonensis, Wamweracaudia keranjei, Dicraeosaurus sattleri, Tornieria africana and Giraffatitan brancai, providing evidence of at least five independent origins and/or reversals of pneumaticity of anterior caudal vertebrae in Neosauropoda, is published by Beeston et al. (2026).
- Foster et al. (2026) review the history of excavation and study of the fossil material of Dystrophaeus viaemalae, review the geological setting of the fossil material, and interpret the morphology of the fossil material of D. viaemalae (including additional material collected since 2014) as unlikely to be a member of Diplodocoidea.
- Sánchez-Fenollosa, García-Cobeña & Cobos (2026) report the discovery of fossil material of a member of the genus Diplodocus from the Upper Jurassic strata of the Villar del Arzobispo Formation (Spain), extending known geographical range of the genus beyond North America.
- The study by Gallagher et al. (2025) reporting evidence of preservation of microbodies within epidermis in the scales of juvenile specimens of Diplodocus sp. from the Mother's Day Quarry, (Morrison Formation; Montana, United States), which they identify as probable fossil melanosomes, is criticized by Rossi & McNamara (2026).
- Gallina et al. (2026) describe new diplodocid postcranial remains from the Lower Cretaceous strata of the Bajada Colorada Formation (Argentina).
- Lerzo (2026) reevaluates Nopcsaspondylus alarconensis and considers it to be a nomen dubium.
- The sauropod specimen MMCh-PV 47 from the Candeleros Formation (Argentina), originally described as a titanosaur by Otero et al. (2011), is interpreted as a rebbachisaurid by Lerzo (2026), providing new information on the tail musculature of members of this group.
- Garderes, Lerzo & Knoll (2026) study the endocranial morphology of Sidersaura marae, and report evidence indicating that rebbachisaurids might have differed from other sauropods in the variation in hearing capabilities relative to body size.
- Rego et al. (2026) study the taphonomy of remains of Itapeuasaurus cajapioensis preserved in transitional to marginal-marine depositional context of the Alcântara Formation (Brazil).
- A study on changes of diversity of Diplodocoidea and its subgroups during the Jurassic-Cretaceous transition is published by Órfão et al. (2026), who reports evidence of two distinct peaks of diversity in Late Jurassic and Early Cretaceous, and evidence of distinct patterns of geographic distributions of Flagellicaudata and Rebbachisauridae.
- A study on the biogeography of Diplodocoidea, with a focus on diplodocids from the Morrison Formation, is published by Boisvert et al. (2026).
- Garderes et al. (2026) present a reconstruction of the cranial musculature of Bajadasaurus pronuspinax.
- Hullinger et al. (2026) describe apatosaurine remains from Arches National Park (Utah, United States), representing a medium-sized yet geologically young member of the group.
- A vertebra interpreted as the northernmost record of Barosaurus lentus from the Morrison Formation reported to date is described from the Pryor Mountains (Montana, United States) by Woodruff et al. (2026).
- van der Linden et al. (2026) report on a specimen of Barosaurus with a pathology in the "whip" part of the tail.
- Carpenter, Ikejiri & Wilson (2026) study the anatomy of postcranial skeleton of two immature specimens of Camarasaurus lentus from the strata of the Morrison Formation from Dinosaur National Monument (Utah, United States), interpreted as representing sequential stages in the ontogeny of the species and providing new information on its morphological variability.
- Yoshida, Carpenter & Kobayashi (2026) report the discovery of fossil material of members of Somphospondyli from the Cedar Mountain Formation (Utah, United States), providing evidence of coexistence of members of this group and brachiosaurids in North America during the Aptian.
- A new dinosaur tracksite dominated by tracks of sauropods (probably non-titanosaurian members of Somphospondyli) is described from the Lower Cretaceous strata of the Wawukuang Formation (Shandong, China) by Ren et al. (2026).
- Averianov et al. (2026) describe a partial fibula of a probable member of Euhelopodidae from the Lower Cretaceous Ilek Formation (Kemerovo Oblast, Russia), interpreted as evidence of presence of two sauropod taxa at the Shestakovo 3 locality.
- A study on the bone histology and growth patterns of Malarguesaurus florenciae is published by Previtera (2026).
- Redescription of the anatomy and a study on the affinities of Triunfosaurus leonardii is published by Mannion & Carvalho (2026), who interpret the studied species as a member of Somphospondyli belonging or closely related to Titanosauria.
- Iangrai et al. (2026) report the discovery of probable titanosaur remains from the Upper Cretaceous Mahadek Formation (India).
- New titanosaur fossil material, including one of the largest femora of Jainosaurus reported to date, is described from the Maastrichtian Lameta Formation (India) by Kumar et al. (2026).
- Pal & Deshmukh (2026) described an ulna and radius of two titanosaur specimens discovered from Lameta Formation (India), with the first osteohistological description of a juvenile specimen from the country.
- Averianov et al. (2026) describe the first cervical vertebra referable to Tengrisaurus starkovi, and recover it as a basal member of Colossosauria in an updated phylogenetic study including this new material.
- Fossil material of a non-saltasaurine titanosaur (possibly a member of Colossosauria), representing the first dinosaur record from the Oriente Basin at the Upper Cretaceous (Maastrichtian) Tena Formation (Ecuador), is described by Balcázar-Loaiza et al. (2026).
- Pérez Moreno et al. (2026) revise the fossil material attributed to Muyelensaurus pecheni, interpret it as belonging to sauropods from more than one taxon, and restrict M. pecheni to the holotype specimen only.
- Navarro et al. (2026) describe a titanosaur axis with possible lognkosaurian affinities from the Upper Cretaceous São José do Rio Preto Formation (Brazil), providing evidence of presence of a sauropod with body dimensions comparable to those of Futalognkosaurus in the Bauru Group prior to the Campanian, and report evidence of presence of phylogenetically informative character in the sauropod axis vertebrae.
- A caudal vertebra of a small-bodied titanosaur (probably a non-saltasaurid member of Eutitanosauria) is described from the Upper Cretaceous (Campanian) strata of the Santa Marta Formation (James Ross Island, Antarctica) by Barrett et al. (2026).
- A study on changes in the skeleton of Neuquensaurus australis, based on data from the skeleton of a juvenile individual, is published by Zurriaguz et al. (2026), who also study the bone histology of the new individual, reporting evidence of an overall rapid growth, but also evidence of at least one cyclical growth mark in the cortex.
- A study on a bone accumulation from the Campanian strata of the Anacleto Formation (Argentina) dominated by disarticulated remains of at least six specimens of Neuquensaurus australis (five subadults and one juvenile), interpreted as likely resulting from a non-catastrophic mortality event, is published by Citton et al. (2026).
- Capurro & Fernández (2026) study the structure of shells of titanosaur eggs from the Auca Mahuevo site (Argentina), reporting evidence that the studied eggshells had comparable values of water vapour conductance and porosity to eggshells of extant archosaurs incubating their eggs in open nests.
- A bowl-shaped depression with scratch and claw traces, interpreted as likely resulting from repeated sauropod foot movement and possibly representing an abandoned nest dug by a titanosaur sauropod, is reported from the Maastrichtian strata of the El Molino Formation (Bolivia) by Meyer et al. (2026).
- Tanaka et al. (2026) report the discovery of shells of titanosaur eggs from the Maastrichtian strata of the Chorrillo Formation in southernmost Patagonia (Argentina), providing evidence of sauropod nesting at highest palaeolatitude in the Southern Hemisphere reported to date, and interpret the studied eggs as buried in a mound-style nest and incubated with heat from decaying vegetation.
- Alessandretti et al. (2026) describe sauropod undertracks from the Upper Cretaceous Capacete Formation (Brazil), determine the environmental conditions that resulted in their formation and preservation, and interpret the sedimentological and paleontological data from the Sanfranciscana Basin coupled with reconstructions of Late Cretaceous climate as suggestive of sauropod migrations from the Bauru Basin to the Sanfranciscana Basin.
- Bellardini et al. (2026) describe new sauropod fossil material from the Allen Formation (Argentina), providing evidence of presence of sauropods in southeastern Neuquén Basin at the time of environmental of changes in northern Patagonia linked with the ocean transgression during the Maastrichtian, and providing possible evidence of presence of a sauropod taxon distinct from Aeolosaurus rionegrinus, Bonatitan, Menucocelsior and Rocasaurus in the Allen Formation.

=== Ornithischian research ===
- Reid, Fonseca & Madzia (2026) evaluate the history of ornithischian clade names and their synonymy.
- A study on the life history of Changchunsaurus parvus, providing evidence of one of the slowest growth rates reported in dinosaurs, is published by Wang et al. (2026).
- Avrahami & Zanno (2026) describe the anatomy of the cranial elements of Fona herzogae.
- Ornithischian fossil material including caudal vertebrae with similarities to the vertebrae of Psittacosaurus, representing the westernmost record of a dinosaur from the Lower Cretaceous Bayin-Gobi Formation (China) reported to date, is described by Li et al. (2026).

==== Thyreophoran research ====
- Sánchez-Fenollosa, Cobos & Suñer (2026) describe new stegosaurian fossil material from the Villar del Arzobispo Formation (Spain), and revise the fossil record of Stegosauria from the eastern part of the Iberian Peninsula.
- Hunt-Foster et al. (2026) describe portions of forelimbs of an indeterminate stegosaurid from the Brushy Basin Member of the Morrison Formation (Utah, United States), estimated to be the largest stegosaurid specimen from the Morrison Formation reported to date.
- Costa (2026) identifies five additional occurrences of dacentrurine stegosaur fossils (besides the holotype of Alcovasaurus/Miragaia longispinus) in the Upper Jurassic strata of the Morrison Formation (United States).
- A juvenile specimen representing the smallest individual of Stegosaurus stenops reported to date is described from the strata of the Morrison Formation in Wyoming (United States) by Carpenter (2026).
- New thyreophoran fossil material with probable stegosaurian affinities is described from the Lower Cretaceous (Berriasian–Valanginian) Bajada Colorada Formation (Argentina) by Riguetti et al. (2026).
- Agnolín et al. (2026) report the discovery of new fossil material of Patagopelta cristata, providing new information on the anatomy of members of this species and supporting its placement within Parankylosauria.
- Cross et al. (2026) modify and develop new tooth characters for ankylosaur systematics, and study the phylogenetic relationships of members of this group.
- New information on the internal anatomy of the skull of Panoplosaurus mirus is provided by Livius et al. (2026).
- Yoon et al. (2026) identify probable ankylosaurid tracks, referred to as cf. Ruopodosaurus, from the Cenomanian Jindong Formation (South Korea).
- Zhu et al. (2026) describe new fossil material of Pinacosaurus grangeri from the Upper Cretaceous Wulansuhai Formation (China), refine the diagnosis of this species, study changes in its skull morphology during its life history, and report possible evidence of sexual dimorphism.

==== Cerapod research ====
- Kim, Lee & Gihm (2026) report the discovery of a trackway of a running ornithopod from the Lower Cretaceous (Aptian–Albian) strata of the Hasandong Formation (South Korea).
- Rotatori et al. (2026) study the phylogenetic relationships of iguanodontian ornithopods and reconstruct the evolutionary history of the group, name a new clade Ouranosauria, and trace the major radiation of Iguanodontia to the Early Jurassic (Pliensbachian–Toarcian).
- Naugolnykh & Afonkin (2026) report the discovery of ornithopod footprints from the Lower Cretaceous (Valanginian) strata from Stavropol Krai (Russia), and name a new ichnotaxon Iguanodontipus lermontovi.
- Description of new fossil material of Muttaburrasaurus langdoni and a study on its craniodental anatomy, palaeoneurology and sensory palaeobiology is published by Herne et al. (2026).
- Three iguanodontian specimens with a morphology distinct from those of members of the genera Dryosaurus and Camptosaurus are described from the strata of the Morrison Formation from the Simon Quarry (Wyoming, United States) by Krumenacker et al. (2026).
- Rodríguez-Borges et al. (2026) describe a femur of an early juvenile iguanodontian of uncertain affinities from the Santonian Bajo de la Carpa Formation (Argentina), and report evidence of ontogenetic and intraspecific variability of femoral characters used in the studies of the phylogenetic relationships of ornithopods.
- Rocchi et al. (2026) provide new information on the anatomy of Dysalotosaurus lettowvorbecki and changes in its skeleton during its ontogeny on the basis of the study of an immature individual from the Tendaguru Formation (Tanzania).
- Dieudonné, Paulina-Carabajal & Cruzado-Caballero (2026) redescribe the anatomy of the skull of Gasparinisaura cincosaltensis, and name a new clade Dysalotosaurinae within Dryosauridae.
- Galton & Carpenter (2026) redescribe the anatomy of the holotype and paratypes of Camptosaurus dispar and the holotype of C. medius, and support the interpretation of C. medius, C. nanus and C. browni as junior synonyms of C. dispar.
- Gônet, Allain & Houssaye (2026) determine probable locomotor preferences of Iguanodon bernissartensis, Ouranosaurus nigeriensis and Lurdusaurus arenatus, interpreting the studied taxa as likely obligate quadrupeds, and interpreting Lurdusaurus as the first known graviportal ornithopod.
- Kondo et al. (2026) identify a sternal plate of an indeterminate member of Iguanodontia (possibly a hadrosauroid) from the Upper Cretaceous (Turonian-Coniacian) Ashizawa Formation (Futaba Group), belonging to an individual that was smaller than other iguanodontians reported from the Upper Cretaceous marine strata from Japan.
- Salas-Herrera et al. (2026) diagnose a specimen of Iguanodon bernissartensis from the Barremian Arcillas de Morella Formation (Spain) with a pathological overgrowth in the tibia as affected by acute overlying skin ulceration, possibly a tropical ulcer.
- New information on variability of cranial morphology of Iguanodon is provided by Verdú et al. (2026).
- Guo et al. (2026) describe the first hadrosauroid specimen from the Lower Cretaceous Baiyanhua Formation (Inner Mongolia, China), preserving a combination of anatomical traits approaching the hadrosaurid condition and traits seen in earlier-diverging ornithopods.
- Ma et al. (2026) report the discovery of a new skull of Qianjiangsaurus changshengi from the Upper Cretaceous Zhengyang Formation (China), preserving evidence of presence of a hollow crest on the skull of the studied dinosaur that was structurally non-homologous with crests of lambeosaurine hadrosaurids.
- Muscioni et al. (2026) provide new information on the rostral anatomy of Tethyshadros insularis, reporting evidence of presence of a well-developed neurovascular network in the beak, interpreted as suggestive of tactile capabilities of the beak as well as of presence of a heat-exchange system that included cooling of the blood across the beak and nasal passages.
- Ma et al. (2026) study the taphonomy and age profile of the assemblage dominated by specimens of Bactrosaurus johnsoni from the Upper Cretaceous Iren Dabasu Formation (China) collected during fieldwork conducted in 2014 and 2015, report that the assemblage is dominated by nestling and juvenile individuals (interpreted as consistent with population segregation between juveniles and adults and with herding behavior of B. johnsoni), and interpret the studied fossil assemblage as likely affected by an attritional mortality pattern.
- Yu et al. (2026) report the first discovery of lambeosaurine hadrosaurid fossil material from the Campanian Nenjiang Formation (China), interpreted by the authors as supporting Asian origin of the group.
- Sharpe & Brown (2026) describe fossil material of Hypacrosaurus altispinus from the Horseshoe Canyon Formation (Alberta, Canada), representing the northernmost record of the species reported to date; the authors also provide evidence of morphological separation between H. altispinus and "Hypacrosaurus" stebingeri, and propose a new combination Corythosaurus stebingeri for the latter species.
- Dudgeon, Brown & Evans (2026) describe the internal crest anatomy of mature individuals of Corythosaurus casuarius, C. intermedius and Lambeosaurus lambei.
- A study on bite force and stress distribution in the skull of Corythosaurus casuarius, providing evidence of changes of feeding mechanics of the studied hadrosaurid during its life history, is published by Dudgeon & Evans (2026).
- Hunter & Janis (2026) compare tooth wear in juvenile and adult individuals of Maiasaura peeblesorum, and report evidence of differences interpreted as consistent with a shift from feeding on nutritious, low-fiber plants to feeding on nutritionally poor, high-fiber plants during the life of the studied dinosaur.
- Duarte-Bigurra et al. (2026) describe partial hadrosaurid specimens from the Campanian strata of the Fronteras section of the Cabullona Group from Arroyo del Alamito and Puerto Viejo localities (Sonora, Mexico), providing evidence of presence in southern Laramidia of members of the tribe Kritosaurini related to "secernosaurs" from Patagonia (Argentina).
- Saitta et al. (2026) reconstruct the taphonomic sequence of preservation of specimens of Edmontosaurus annectens from the Lance Formation (Wyoming, United States) described by Sereno et al. (2025), and find no convincing evidence of preservation of original tissue structures or biomolecules.
- Bateman & Larsson (2026) compare the cranial musculature and likely feeding performance of Stegoceras validum and other ornithischians, providing evidence of greater similarity of the feeding performance of S. validum to those of basal ornithischians and ornithopods than to that of Psittacosaurus lujiatunensis, and interpret their findings as indicating that evolution of cranial domes of pachycephalosaurs constrained the evolution of their jaw musculature and their feeding performance.
- Moore et al. (2026) describe postcranial remains of an indeterminate, early juvenile pachycephalosaur specimen from the Maastrichtian Frenchman Formation (Saskatchewan, Canada), representing the ontogenetically youngest pachycephalosaur postcranium reported to date.
- Woodruff et al. (2026) identify a probable ceratobranchial in the holotype of "Dracorex hogwartsia", representing the first record of this bone in a member of Pachycephalosauria and providing possible evidence of mobility of their tongues.
- Wu et al. (2026) reconstruct the anatomy of the neurovascular system in the mandible of Psittacosaurus sp. from the Jiufotang Formation (Liaoning, China).
- Maidment et al. (2026) use new remains of Ajkaceratops kozmai from the Late Cretaceous Csehbánya Formation (Hungary) to conclude that this species is confidently a ceratopsian, "Mochlodon" vorosi is a junior synonym of this species, and Late Cretaceous Europe preserves a previously unrecognized diversity of horned dinosaurs represented by taxa otherwise accepted as 'rhabdodontids', despite previous records having suggested the contrary.
- Reconstruction of the nasal soft tissues of ceratopsids is presented by Tada et al. (2026).
- Theurer et al. (2026) provide new information on the structure of the ceratopsid lower leg and feet on the basis of the study of an indeterminate ceratopsid hindlimb from the Upper Cretaceous Dinosaur Park Formation (Alberta, Canada).
- A pathological caudal vertebra of Medusaceratops lokii affected by chronic osteomyelitis with a draining sinus tract is described from the Upper Cretaceous Judith River Formation (Montana, United States) by Wang et al. (2026).
- Ames, Rowe & Button (2026) compare biomechanical performance of skulls and horns of five ceratopsian taxa in simulated combat behaviors, and argue that evolution of the diversity of ceratopsian cranial morphologies might have been driven by the diversity of their combat styles.

== Birds ==
=== New bird taxa ===
Name	Novelty	Status	Authors	Age	Type locality	Country	Notes	Images
Asio pythiotus	Sp. nov	Valid	Zelenkov	Pleistocene		Crimea	An owl, a species of Asio.	
Bavaricarbo	Gen. et sp. nov	Valid	Mayr, Lechner & Böhme	Miocene	Hammerschmiede clay pit	Germany	A member of the stem group of Phalacrocoracidae. The type species is B. brevirostris.	
Coracias chauvireae	Sp. nov	Valid	Zelenkov	Pleistocene		Crimea	A roller, a species of Coracias.	
Corvus venustus	Sp. nov	Valid	Zelenkov	Pleistocene		Crimea	A species of Corvus.	
Daniatrogon	Gen. et sp. nov	Valid	Mayr	Eocene	Fur Formation	Denmark	A trogon. The type species is D. kochi.	
Eopavo	Gen. et sp. nov	Valid	Yu et al.	Miocene	Liushu Formation	China	A peafowl. The type species is E. hezhengensis.	
Eschatornis	Gen. et sp. nov	Valid	Machado et al.	Pleistocene		Brazil	A member of the family Phorusrhacidae. The type species is E. aterradora.	
Gorgonavis	Gen. et sp. nov	Valid	Nebreda et al.	Early Cretaceous (Barremian)	La Huérguina Formation	Spain	A member of Enantiornithes belonging or related to the family Longipterygidae. The type species is G. alcyone.	
Jamninkaornis	Gen. et sp. nov	Valid	Bochenski et al.	Oligocene		Poland	A passerine in the suborder Tyranni. The type species is J. kencampbelli.	
Kunpengornis	Gen. et sp. nov	Valid	Huang et al.	Early Cretaceous	Jiufotang Formation	China	A euornithean. The type species is K. anhuimusei. Announced in 2025, the final article version was published in 2026.	
Masillastrix	Gen. et sp. nov	Valid	Mayr in Mayr et al.	Middle Eocene	Messel Formation	Germany	A stem-owl. The type species is M. blattophaga .	
Megapodius rokusi	Sp. nov		Meijer et al.	Pleistocene		Indonesia	A megapode.	
Meterchen	Gen. et sp. nov	Valid	Tennyson et al.	Miocene	Bannockburn Formation	New Zealand	A probable goose. The type species is M. luti.	
Mioaetus	Gen. et sp. nov	Valid	Mayr, Lechner & Böhme	Miocene	Hammerschmiede clay pit	Germany	A member of the family Accipitridae. The type species is M. pforzenensis.	
Pavo miejue	Sp. nov	Valid	Lan, Mayr & Tsai	Pleistocene	Chiting Formation	Taiwan	A species of Pavo.	
Plumadraco	Gen. et sp. nov	Valid	Clark et al.	Early Cretaceous (Aptian)	Jiufotang Formation	China	A member of Enantiornithes. The type species is P. bankoorum.	
Porphyrio claytongreenei	Sp. nov	Valid	Worthy et al.	Pleistocene		New Zealand	A swamphen.	
Pujatopouli	Gen. et sp. nov	Valid	Irazoqui et al.	Late Cretaceous (Maastrichtian)	López de Bertodano Formation	Antarctica	A probable member of Neoaves with affinities with the group Aequornithes. The type species is P. soberana. Announced in 2025, the final article version was published in 2026.	
Rhynchaeites mcfaddeni	Sp. nov	Valid	Ksepka et al.	Eocene	Green River Formation	United States (Wyoming)	A stem-ibis.	
Shargaotis	Gen. et sp. nov	Valid	Zelenkov	Miocene		Mongolia	A bustard. The type species is S. ignipes. Published online in 2026, but the issue date is listed as December 2025.	
Strigops insulaborealis	Sp. nov	Valid	Worthy et al.	Pleistocene		New Zealand	A parrot related to the kākāpō.	
Tenuicruris	Gen. et sp. nov		White et al.	Early Cretaceous (Albian)	Toolebuc Formation	Australia	A member of Enantiornithes. The type species is T. piscanexum.	
Urmiornis shargensis	Sp. nov	Valid	Zelenkov	Miocene		Mongolia	A member of Ergilornithidae.	
Vegavis geitononesos	Sp. nov	Valid	Irazoqui et al.	Late Cretaceous (Maastrichtian)	López de Bertodano Formation	Antarctica	A neornithine; a species of Vegavis.	
Vegavis notopothousa	Sp. nov	Valid	Irazoqui et al.	Late Cretaceous (Maastrichtian)	López de Bertodano Formation	Antarctica	A neornithine; a species of Vegavis.	V. notopothousa (d, i, k, o)
Xenicus longipes perditus	Ssp. nov		Verry et al.	Holocene		New Zealand	A subspecies of the bushwren.	
Yuezhuornis	Gen. et sp. nov	Valid	Xu et al.	Late Jurassic (Tithonian)	Nanyuan Formation	China	An early member of Avialae. The type species is Y. yangyuanensis.	
Zhengheornis	Gen. et sp. nov		Wang et al.	Late Jurassic (Tithonian)	Nanyuan Formation	China	An early member of Avialae. The type species is Z. buyu.	

=== Avian research ===
- Evidence from the study of birds and extinct bird-line archosaurs, linking changes of shape of semicircular canals at the time of the dinosaur–bird transition and the origin of avian flight to morphological changes in the head-neck system of birds and their relatives rather than to sensory function, is presented by Navalón et al. (2026).
- Benito et al. (2026) contest the conclusions of the study of Wilken et al. (2025) about the evolution of the ability of birds to move parts of the skull independently, arguing that these conclusions were based on inadequate taxon sampling and morphological misinterpretations; in response Wilken et al. (2026) agree that the bone interpreted in the 2025 study as a coracoid of Janavis is more likely to be a pterygoid, but question the affinities of this bone among Mesozoic birds, and overall reaffirm their original conclusion that powered prokinesis is most likely an autapomorphy of neognath birds.
- Review of research from the preceding years on the phylogenetic relationships of birds and on their diversification throughout their evolutionary history is published by Benito& Steell (2026).
- Lechki & Benson (2026) compare the reproductive output of extant and extinct amniotes, and link the increase of size of eggs and offspring (relative to adult size) in birds compared to other dinosaurs to the evolution of larger brain, likely also related to increased parental care.
- Liu et al. (2026) identify the best predictors of body mass in extant birds, and provide new estimates of body mass of Mesozoic birds.
- Evidence of a long-term trend towards increase of the forelimb length during the evolution of Mesozoic birds is presented by Hellyer-Price et al. (2026).
- Jo et al. (2026) report the first discovery of Mesozoic avialan-type eggs from Korea, discovered in the mid-Cretaceous strata of the Ilseongsan Formation (South Korea), and name a new ootaxon Onggwanoolithus aphaedoensis.
- O'Connor & Marugán-Lobón (2026) revise the fossil record of avialans from the Upper Jurassic Solnhofen Limestones (Germany), consider purported diagnostic characters of Ostromia crassipes and Alcmonavis poeschli to be equivocal, and interpret the studied fossils as most likely representing a single taxon (Archaeopteryx); another revision of Solnhofen avialans is subsequently published by Foth & Rauhut (2026), who interpret the holotype of Ostromia crassipes as an indeterminate avialan, and interpret Alcmonavis poeschli as likely to be a distinct taxon.
- Evidence indicating that Archaeopteryx was capable of achieving take-off velocity sufficient to become airborne in two to three leaps is presented by Meilak et al. (2026).
- Fossil evidence of utilization of diverse food resources by Sapeornis, including feeding on fruits, is presented by Wang et al. (2026).
- Zhou et al. (2026) interpret the evolution of teeth of Mesozoic birds as random and mainly influenced by phylogeny and evolution time, with no evidence of a consistent trend towards tooth loss.
- Rivera-Sylva, Guzmán-Gutiérrez & Rangel-Morelos (2026) review the fossil record of Cretaceous birds from Mexico.
- Wilson et al. (2026) study the composition of the avialan teeth assemblage from the Upper Cretaceous Prince Creek Formation (Alaska, United States), identifying the presence of seven distinct tooth morphotypes.
- Wu et al. (2026) study the evolution of the triosseal canal of birds on the basis of data from Archaeorhynchus and a new enantiornithean specimen from the Jiufotang Formation (Liaoning, China), interpreting the triosseal canal as resulting from evolution of the coracoscapular joint into synchondrosis in members of Ornithothoraces, and from subsequent closing of the canal in members of Ornithuromorpha as a result of the appearance of the acrocoracoclavicular joint between their coracoid and furcula.
- Kuo et al. (2026) report the discovery of an enantiornithean specimen from the Jiufotang Formation with distinctly shaped uncinate processes of ribs and study the morphological diversity of the uncinate processes of birds, reporting evidence of a link between uncinate process length and ecological attributes of birds, including their flight performance.
- Haase et al. (2026) reconstruct resting and peak metabolic rates of four enantiornithean specimens from the Lower Cretaceous strata from China and Spain, interpreted as consistent with semi-precocial or precocial development.
- Clark et al. (2026) describe two new specimens of Longipteryx chaoyangensis with the best-preserved plumage reported to date and providing the first evidence of wing shape of the studied birds.
- Holdaway et al. (2026) study the variation within the moa genus Euryapteryx, and find that their phylogenetic relationships indicated by the study of ancient mitochondrial DNA do not match patterns recovered in morphometric analysis.
- A study on the hindlimb morphology of extant rheas, and a taxonomic revision of fossil and archaeological rheid material, is published by Picasso, Acosta Hospitaleche & Quaggia (2026).
- Mayr et al. (2026) describe new ergilornithid fossil material from the Miocene locality Kayaca (Beyağaç Basin, Turkey), corroborating struthioniform affinities of the studied group.
- Evidence from the study of ostrich eggshells from Middle Pleistocene to late Holocene sites in Israel, indicative of shift from eggshells with pore patterns similar to those seen in extant Somali ostrich to eggshells with pore patterns similar to those seen in Arabian ostrich which might related to a species turnover in the studied area between 100,000 and 70,000 years ago, is presented by Tsahar et al. (2026).
- Evidence interpreted as indicating that Pliocene dispersal of large palaeognathous birds through passive rafting between continental Africa and the Canary Islands was theoretically possible is presented by Lécuyer, Buffetaut & Sánchez Marco (2026).
- Niespolo et al. (2026) determine the youngest known eggshells of Genyornis to be approximately 46-44,000 years old.
- Sosa & Acosta Hospitaleche (2026) describe a synsacrum of an indeterminate member of Neognathae from the Ypresian strata of the La Meseta Formation from the Seymour Island, interpreted as evidence of presence of a small shorebird or marine bird in Antarctica during the Eocene.
- Somogyi et al. (2026) interpret cases of apparent morphological convergence in members of major lineages of Neoaves that lack consistent functional drivers as likely linked to high levels of incomplete lineage sorting during the early radiation of the group in the aftermath of the Cretaceous–Paleogene extinction event, resulting in difficulty of phylogenetic placement of early Cenozoic members of the group.
- Hellyer-Price, Venditti & Humphries (2026) calculate the drag on the bill of Pelagornis while skimming, and argue that the studied bird was likely unable to skim-feed.
- Goedert et al. (2026) report the discovery of a braincase of Pelagornis orri from the Miocene Astoria Formation (Oregon, United States), providing new information on the anatomy of the species, as well as discovery of isolated vertebra and phalanx bone of Pelagornis sp. from the Eocene Keasey Formation (Oregon), representing one of the oldest pelagornithid records reported to date.
- Degrange et al. (2026) study the anatomy of the brain endocast of Conflicto antarcticus, reporting the absence of Wulsts, lack of adaptations to filter-feeding seen in extant anatids, and presence of large olfactory bulbs.
- Van der Meer & Langeveld (2026) report the discovery of fossil material of the harlequin duck from the Quaternary strata from the Dutch North Sea, representing the second fossil record of the species from Europe reported to date.
- Jones et al. (2026) report the first discovery of fossil material of a member of the family Cracidae (possibly the dusky-legged guan) from the Pleistocene strata of the Sopas Formation (Uruguay).
- Barcelos-Silveira et al. (2026) study the environmental conditions controlling the formation of rotating-stamping structures resulting from stamping behavior of extant flamingos, and evaluate possibilities of identification of rotating-stamping structures in the trace fossil record and their potential utility for paleoenvironmental reconstructions.
- Citron et al. (2026) study the anatomy of skulls and endocasts of the dodo and the Rodrigues solitaire, and report evidence of differences in the visual and olfactory systems of the dodo compared to those of extant doves and pigeons.
- Zelenkov (2026) describes fossil material of Pleistocene bustards from the Taurida Cave (Crimea), confirms the validity and distinctiveness of Otis lambrechti and "Otis" kalmani, and assigns the latter species to the genus Tetrax.
- De los Reyes, Acosta Hospitaleche & Sosa (2026) report the discovery of a tarsometatarsus of the grey-cowled wood rail from the strata of the La Esperanza Formation (Buenos Aires Province, Argentina), interpreted as suggestive of presence of seasonal wetlands and/or humid scrublands in the studied area during the early Pleistocene.
- Stewart et al. (2026) identify Pleistocene and Holocene remains from France, Germany, Spain and United Kingdom attributed to Grus primigenia as remains of extant common crane on the basis of ancient DNA evidence.
- Lenser, Reed & Worthy (2026) interpret the fossil record of shorebirds from the Blanche Cave (South Australia) as indicative of mostly terrestrial environment in the studied area in the Pleistocene, including open forest and woodland but also with wetland elements, and interpret changes of composition of the studied assemblage as indicative of decrease in available wetlands at the end of the Last Glacial Maximum.
- Zhao et al. (2026) reconstruct the phylogenetic relationships and evolutionary history of extant and extinct snipes and woodcocks, reporting evidence of four independent dispersals between hemispheres and a dispersal into southwest Pacific islands from South America.
- Snyderman et al. (2026) report different estimates of the timing of extinction of the great auk based on radiocarbon data and on the record of historical sightings, and argue that the species might have persisted in northwestern Atlantic beyond 1844.
- Irazoqui, Paulina-Carabajal & Acosta Hospitaleche (2026) reconstruct the anatomy of the central nervous system of Pujatopouli soberana.
- Evidence of distinct cranial anantomy, sexual size dimorphism and adaptions of hindlimbs to underwater locomotion in the spectacled cormorant is presented by Samsonov et al. (2026).
- A study on the phylogenetic relationships of the spectacled cormorant as indicated by ancient DNA data is published by Sharko et al. (2026).
- Pillay et al. (2026) conduct a survey of ancient DNA from subfossil remains from Nuku Hiva (French Polynesia), identify a wide range of vertebrate taxa on the basis of bulk bone metabarcoding, and report the identification of remains of seabird taxa new to the archaeological record of the Marquesas Islands, including possible record of the sooty shearwater and the flesh-footed shearwater.
- Xia, Wu & Li (2026) interpret elemental distribution in fossils of Eocene penguins from the La Meseta and Submeseta formations (Seymour Island, Antarctica) as providing evidence of changes of weathering intensity, depositional energy and redox conditions in Antarctica related to shift from a warm climate during early Eocene to subsequent cooling during middle-late Eocene.
- Probable evidence of sex-related variation in the microstructure of penguin bones from the La Meseta and Submeseta formations is presented by Garat, Acosta Hospitaleche & Talevi (2026).
- Mayr & Richter (2026) describe new fossil material of Hassiavis laticauda from the Eocene Messel Formation (Germany), providing new information on the anatomy of members of this species, and reevaluate the phylogenetic affinities of Archaeotrogonidae.
- New fossil material of the Cuban pauraque and the Antillean nighthawk is described from the Pleistocene and Holocene strata from the El Abrón Cave (Cuba) by Gorbatcheva & Zelenkov (2026).
- Hunt, Lucas & Smith (2026) describe bromalites from the Eocene Willwood Formation (Wyoming, United States) interpreted as owl regurgitalites containing bones of glyptosaurid lizards, and name a new ichnotaxon Sauresus osteodermus.
- New fossil material of Athene vallgornerensis, confirming the taxonomic validity of this species and providing new information on its anatomy, is described from the Pleistocene (Calabrian) strata from Crimea by Zelenkov (2026).
- Fossil material of members of two honeyguide species, representing the earliest record of members of this group reported to date, is described from the Pliocene strata of the Varswater Formation from the Langebaanweg site (South Africa) by Louchart, Manegold & Pavia (2026).
- A study on the bone histology of Andrewsornis abbotti and Physornis fortis, providing evidence of uninterrupted growth strategy in phorusrhacids, is published by Dreyer, Cooper & O'Connor (2026).
- Aronauer, LaBarge & Vélez-Rosado (2026) study the phylogenetic relationships and evolutionary history of phorusrhacids, supporting a northward dispersal of the group during the late Miocene before the Great American Interchange.
- Lo Coco et al. (2026) reinterpret Pleistoanser bravardi as a parrot belonging to the genus Cyanoliseus, resulting in a new combination Cyanoliseus bravardi.
- Mayr (2026) studies the phylogenetic relationships of Parapsittacopes and Psittacomimus, assigning them to the new family Psittacomimidae interpreted as likely sister group of Parapasseres (the clade formed by the Zygodactylidae and Passeriformes).
- A study on the phylogenetic relationships of the Hawaiian honeyeaters, indicative of a relationship with the clade including the families Hypocoliidae and Hylocitreidae rather than a sister relationship with Hypocoliidae alone, is published by Zhao, Kimball & Braun (2026).
- Campana et al. (2026) study the phylogenetic relationships of extant and extinct Hawaiian honeycreepers, and report evidence of adaptive radiation the group following the formation of Oʻahu, and find that the ʻiʻiwi is not closely related to extinct members of the genus Drepanis.
- A study on the morphological diversity of Cretaceous to Pleistocene avian tracks from continents that were parts of Gondwana is published by Farina et al. (2026).
- Review of the composition of the Eocene bird assemblage from the Walton Member of the London Clay (United Kingdom) is published by Mayr (2026).
- Mayr & Collinson (2026) revise the fossil record of stomach contents of Eocene birds from the Messel Pit (Germany), reporting evidence of ingested seeds in representatives of ten species belonging to different bird groups, and interpret the studied fossil record as indicative of Eocene frugivorous birds exploiting existing diversity of flowering plants with edible fruits (whose origin predated those of the studied birds) rather than indicative of coevolution of flowering plants and early frugivorous birds.
- Farina, Krapovickas & Marsicano (2026) study the composition of the bird track assemblage from the Miocene Vinchina Formation (Argentina), including the oldest rheiform track in southern South America reported to date and probable phorusrhacid track.
- Serrano et al. (2026) describe Early Pleistocene bird remains from the Venta Micena site (Spain), interpreted as indicative of presence of wetland environment.
- Zelenkov et al. (2026) report the discovery of fossil material of a new late Pleistocene bird fauna from the Khondu locality (Sakha Republic, Russia), including at least 25 taxa.
- Oros Sršen et al. (2026) study the composition of the late Pleistocene bird assemblages from the Marlera site (Croatia), reporting evidence of presence of taxa associated by open and dry environments, as well as aquatic taxa.
- A study on the composition of the late Pleistocene bird assemblage from the Khondu locality (Sakha Republic, Russia) is published by Maslintsyna & Zelenkov (2026).
- A new, diverse Late Pleistocene bird assemblage is reported from the Taguatagua 3 site in the Tagua Tagua Lake area (Chile) by Alarcón-Muñoz et al. (2026).
- Evidence of stability of distribution of climatically suitable conditions for Eurasian non-migratory bird species during the Last Interglacial and the Last Glacial Maximum is presented by Végvári (2026).
- Evidence from the study of ancient environmental DNA indicative of changes of composition of bird communities in high-latitude areas of Eurasia and Alaska from the Last Glacial Maximum to the Holocene is presented by Sander et al. (2026).
- Peralta et al. (2026) report the discovery of a new avian assemblage from the early Holocene strata from the Molino Doll locality (Entre Ríos Province, Argentina).
- A study on the composition on the middle Holocene avian assemblage from the Cueva del Llano site (Fuerteventura, Canary Islands), providing evidence of presence of taxa typical of forest environments and the edges of bodies of water, is published by Sánchez-Marco, Sánchez-Sastre & Castillo (2026).
- Evidence of impact of large body mass, scavenging feeding habits and general severity of local megafaunal extinctions on the extinction risk of Quaternary birds is provided by Lemoine, Sayol & Faurby (2026).

== Pterosaurs ==
=== New pterosaur taxa ===
Name	Novelty	Status	Authors	Age	Type locality	Country	Notes	Images
Hintighernia	Gen. et sp. nov		Pêgas et al.	Cretaceous	Cambridge Greensand	United Kingdom	A member of the family Tapejaridae. Genus includes new species H. edingerae.	
Laueropterus	Gen. et sp. nov	Valid	Hone	Late Jurassic	Mörnsheim Formation	Germany	An early member of Monofenestrata. The type species is L. vitriolus.	
Rexarthuria	Gen. et comb. nov		Thomas & McDavid	Early Cretaceous (Valanginian)	Tunbridge Wells Sand Formation	United Kingdom	An azhdarchoid; a new genus for "Palaeornis' cliftii Mantell (1844).	
Tylodorhynchus	Gen. et comb. nov	Valid	Pêgas & Holgado	Early Cretaceous (Barremian)	Wessex Formation	United Kingdom	A coloborhynchine anhanguerid; a new genus for "Uktenadactylus" rodriguesae Holgado & Pêgas (2020).	

=== Pterosaur research ===
- Walters, Rayfield & Donoghue (2026) argue that modern reconstructions of pterosaur wings likely underestimate the diversity of wing shapes within this group.
- Ji (2026) describes a partial skeleton of an indeterminate pterosaur, marking the first record of the group from the Mazongshan Dinosaur Fauna (Xiagou Formation, China).
- Cerqueira et al. (2026) compare the allometry in the skeletal elements of Rhamphorhynchus muensteri and pterodactyloid pterosaurs, reporting evidence of differences interpreted as likely linked to different flight capabilities and to differing ecology.
- Tong et al. (2026) report the discovery of two specimens of Cascocauda rong from the Jurassic Tiaojishan Formation (China) providing new information on the anatomy of anurognathids, including evidence of presence of a skull element resembling the supraorbital (or palpebral) bones found in extant lepidosaurs and possibly helping to secure the pterosaurs' eyes within the orbits.
- A probable pterodactyloid radius is reported from the Bathonian strata from the Stonesfield Slate locality (United Kingdom) by Averianov & Lopatin (2026).
- Grice et al. (2026) report evidence of preservation of molecular biomarkers in a pterosaur wing phalanx from the Lower Cretaceous Romualdo Formation (Brazil), and interpret the results of molecular analyses of steroids from the studied fossil as consistent with a diet including fish and/or cephalopods.
- Averianov & Arkhangelsky (2026) identify fossil material of a member of the genus Pteranodon from the Upper Cretaceous (Campanian) strata of the Rybushka Formation (Russia).
- Unwin et al. (2026) argue that the holotype of purported pterosaur Bakiribu waridza is actually fossil material of an indeterminate ray-finned fish (possibly an amiid).
- Averianov & Gubarev (2026) report the discovery of a pterosaur cervical vertebra from the Cenomanian Melovatka Formation (Saratov Oblast, Russia) with similarities to a probable targaryendraconid vertebra from the Albian Toolebuc Formation (Australia), and interpret the studied vertebrae as likely to be the first diagnostic postcranial remains of members of Targaryendraconia.
- A wing phalanx bone of a member of Ornithocheiriformes that is the first known pterosaur bone from Egypt is described from the Cenomanian Bahariya Formation by Salem et al. (2026).
- Wang et al. (2026) describe an articulated forelimb of Hamipterus tianshanensis from the Lower Cretaceous strata in Xinjiang (China), providing new information on the anatomy of members of this species.
- Partial lower jaw and appendicular elements of a medium-sized juvenile anhanguerid specimen are described from the Lower Cretaceous Romualdo Formation (Brazil) by Nascimento, Pêgas & Costa (2026).
- A lower jaw of Brasileodactylus araripensis providing evidence of presence of mandibular crest in the studied pterosaur is described from the Romualdo Formation by Nascimento et al. (2026).
- Araújo et al. (2026) use the data from the study of bone histology of Caiuajara dobruskii to calculate its resting and maximum metabolic rates, recovered as intermediate between those of modern ectothermic and endothermic amniotes, and interpret C. dobruskii as likely capable of prolonged powered flight.
- Jung et al. (2026) describe track of a large pterosaur (possibly a member of Neoazhdarchia) from the Lower Cretaceous (Albian) strata of the Jinju Formation (South Korea), found in close association with a small tetrapod trackway and possibly documenting predation of a pterosaur on a small tetrapod, and name a new ichnotaxon Jinjuichnus procerus.

== Other archosaurs ==
=== Other new archosaur taxa ===
Name	Novelty	Status	Authors	Age	Type locality	Country	Notes	Images
Rewasaurus	Gen. et sp. nov		Sen, Basu & Ray	Late Triassic	Tiki Formation	India	A silesaurid. Genus includes new species R. minori.	

=== Other archosaur research ===
- McDavid, Marchant, & Reid (2026) revise the nomenclature of Alickmeron maleriensis and consider it a junior objective synonym of Alwalkeria maleriensis due to being based on the same holotype and type species, also reinterpreting it as an indeterminate member of Pan-Aves.
- Description of the braincase and cranial endocast of the holotype of Venetoraptor gassenae is published by Damke et al. (2026).
- A femur of one of the largest silesaurids known worldwide is described from the Ladinian strata of the Pinheiros-Chiniquá Sequence of the Santa Maria Supersequence (Brazil) by Müller (2026).

== General research ==
- Sookias et al. (2026) study the diversification of Permian to Early Jurassic Archosauromorpha, reporting evidence of initial high diversification that decreased through time in archosauromorph subgroups (including archosaur ones), but with different trajectories of this pattern in the studied subgroups.
- Napoli (2026) reevaluates two methods (geometric morphometrics and cladistic analysis of ontogeny) used in the studies of extinct vertebrates (especially dinosaurs) aiming to determine which differences between fossil specimens result from variation between different species and which differences result from variation between specimens representing different growth stages (possibly of the same species), reports that application of these methods to extant American and Chinese alligators does not consistently result in correct specific identification, and identifies invariant characters that provide consistent identification of members of different alligator species throughout their life history.
- Lechki & Benson (2026) report evidence of uneven effectiveness of energetic fitness models at predicting body size distributions in different amniote groups, with good results in the study of birds but not in the study of crocodylians and non-avian dinosaurs, and interpret the body size distribution of dinosaurs (including lack of non-avian dinosaurs with body mass of less than 300 g) as influenced not only by their physiology but also by ecological constraints (possibly by competition with mammals and with juveniles of large dinosaurs excluding adult dinosaurs from small body sizes), which were lifted in the bird lineage around the time of the evolution of flight.
- Seymour et al. (2026) determine blood flow rates of 81 species of extinct archosauriforms on the basis of the study of nutrient foramina in their long bones, interpreted as consistent with widespread tachymetabolism in Mesozoic archosaurs.
- Liard, Liard & Buffetaut (2026) review the fossil record of tracks of vertebrates (mostly archosaurs) from the Mesozoic strata from Thailand.
- Evidence supporting the presence of extraoral tissues ("lips") similar to those seen in extant lepidosaurs in Triassic pseudosuchians and dinosaurs from southern Brazil is presented by Terras et al. (2026), who interpret the presence of "lips" in the form of labial scales associated with extensive gingiva covering the teeth as likely to be the plesiomorphic condition in Sauropsida.
- Marchetti et al. (2026) study the composition of the tetrapod (mostly archosaur) track assemblage from the Carnian strata from the Lerici site (Italy), identifying pseudosuchian, theropod and sauropodomorph tracks and providing evidence of co-occurrence of two different sauropodomorph ichnogenera.
- García-Cobeña et al. (2026) report the discovery of new fossil material of vertebrates, including crocodylomorphs and dinosaurs, from the Lower Cretaceous El Castellar Formation (Spain), expanding known vertebrate diversity from the studied formation.
- A cluster of bones of an ornithuromorph bird (possibly Gansus), interpreted as most likely to be originally contained within a pellet produced by a non-avian theropod (possibly Jian changmaensis), is described from the Lower Cretaceous strata of the Xiagou Formation (China) by Wang et al. (2026).
- Wang et al. (2026) describe eusuchian crocodyliform fossil material from the Eocene Wutu Formation, non-eusuchian crocodyliform fossil material possibly from the Upper Cretaceous Wangshi Group (China), and pterodactyloid pterosaur fossil material from the Wangshi Group.
- Egan et al. (2026) reconstruct the ecology and environment of the Late Cretaceous (Campanian) ecosystem of the Dinosaur Park Formation (Saskatchewan, Canada) on the basis of the study of isotopic composition of tooth enamel of vertebrates (mostly archosaurs) and amber, interpreting the studied archosaur assemblage as living close to the coastline of the Western Interior Seaway, and finding no evidence of significant differences in dietary and migratory behaviors between hadrosaurs and ceratopsians.
- Fanti et al. (2026) identify the Late Cretaceous (Campanian) fossil assemblage (including ornithopod Tethyshadros insularis and crocodyliform Acynodon adriaticus) from the Villaggio del Pescatore site (Italy) as living in a tidal flat ecosystem repeatedly affected by tropical cyclones and flood events.
- Soto-Acuña et al. (2026) describe fossil material of large-bodied ornithopods from the Maastrichtian strata of the Quebrada Municipalidad Beds (Chile), and identify purported Eocene presbyornithid remains from the same locality as actually originating from the Upper Cretaceous strata.
- A coprolite produced by a medium-sized theropod (possibly Nanotyrannus or Anzu), preserving skeletal remains of a hesperornithiform bird and feathers that likely belonged to the same bird, is described from the Maastrichtian strata of the Hell Creek Formation (Montana, United States) by O'Connor et al. (2026), who interpret the morphology of the studied feathers as indicative of adaptations of hesperornithiform feathers for reduced penetrability similar to those observed in extant aquatic birds, and indicative of presence of both anatomically modern lightweight and stiff feathers and extinct feather morphotypes in hesperornithiforms.
- Hack et al. (2026) report the discovery of two isolated unguals from the Late Triassic (Rhaetian) Exter Formation (Germany), interpreted as belonging to a sauropodomorph and potentially the largest Triassic pterosaur.
