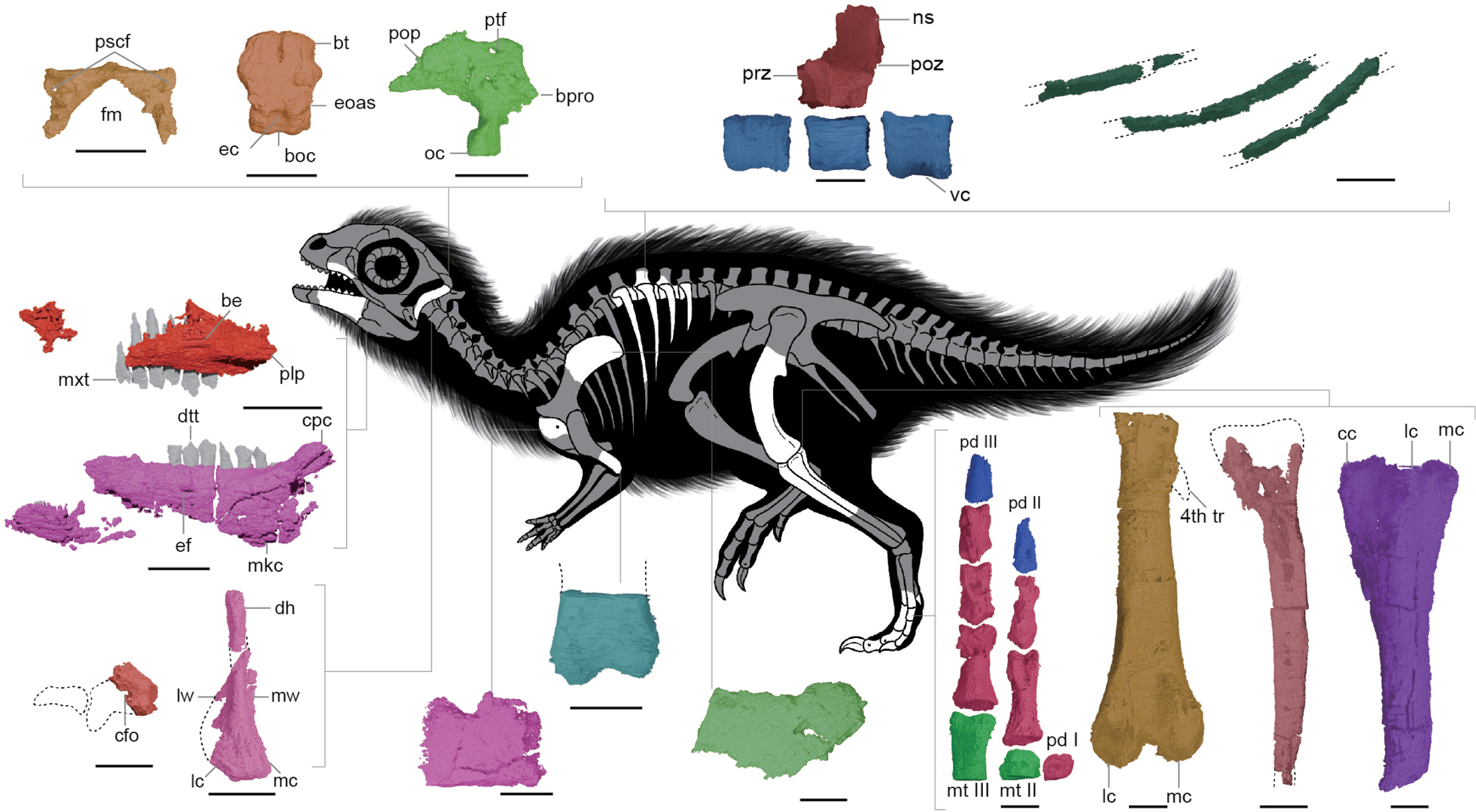
- Reconstructed skeleton indicating known bones of the holotype (white)

Scientific classification
- Kingdom: Animalia
- Phylum: Chordata
- Class: Reptilia
- Clade: Dinosauria
- Clade: †Ornithischia
- Family: †Thescelosauridae
- Genus: †Doolysaurus; Jung et al., 2026
- Species: †D. huhmini

Binomial name
- †Doolysaurus huhmini Jung et al., 2026

= Doolysaurus =

Doolysaurus Temporal range: mid-Cretaceous, (Albian-Cenomanian) ~113–97 Ma

Genus of ornithischian dinosaurs

Doolysaurus is an extinct genus of thescelosaurid ornithischian dinosaur known from the Cretaceous (Albian–lower Cenomanian) Ilseongsan Formation of South Korea. The genus contains a single species, Doolysaurus huhmini, known from the partial skeleton of a small juvenile individual. It is the first named South Korean dinosaur with diagnostic cranial material, providing important insight into the early evolution of thescelosaurid ornithischians in East Asia, and the second named basal neornithischian from South Korea after Koreanosaurus.

== Discovery and naming ==
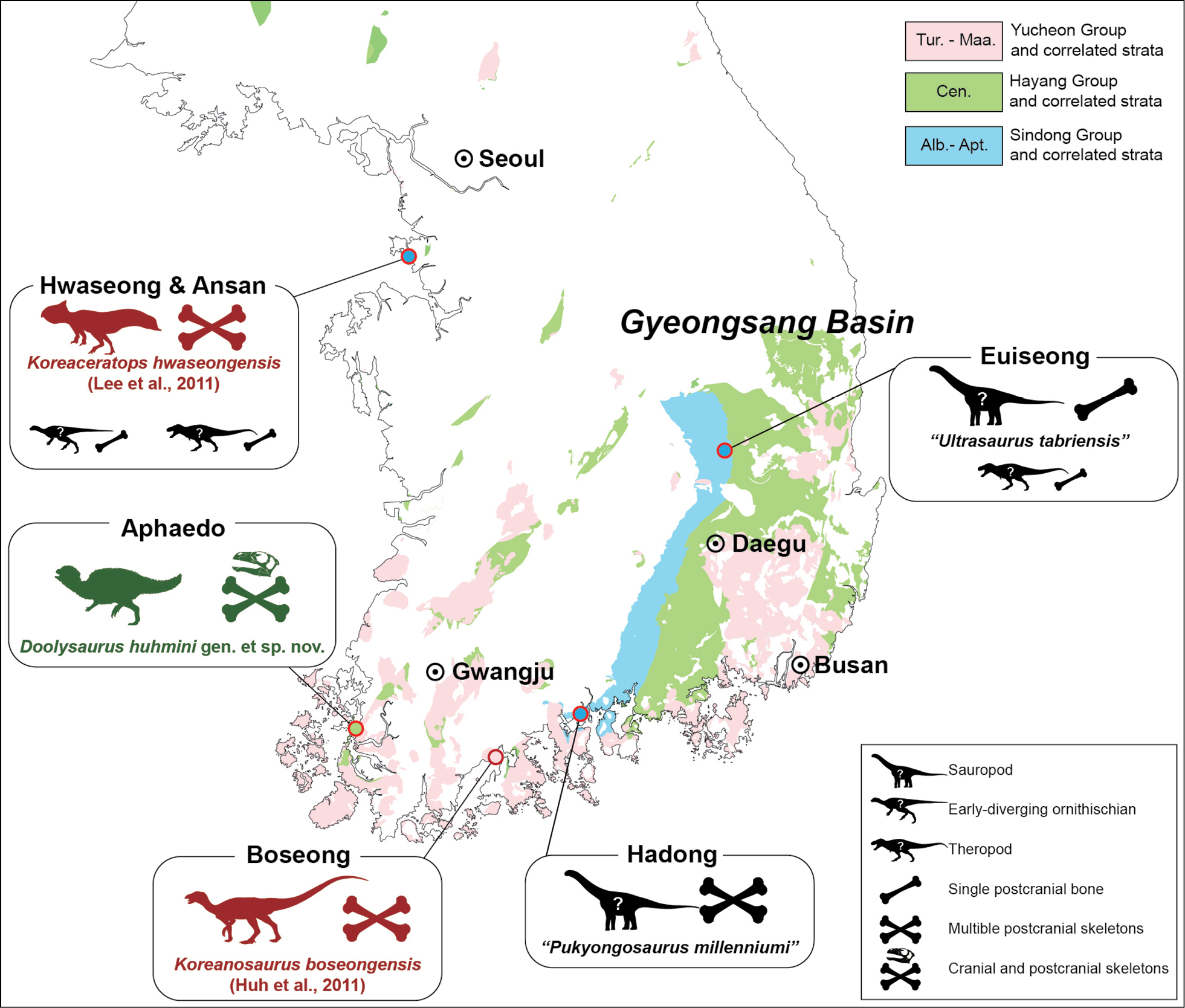
Map of dinosaur body fossils discovered in South Korea, with Doolysaurus in green, left

The Doolysaurus fossil material was discovered in 2023 by Hyemin Jo in outcrops of the Ilseongsan Formation on Aphae Island of Shinan, South Korea. The specimen is housed in the Korea Dinosaur Research Center of the Chonnam National University, where it is permanently accessioned as specimen KDRC-SA-V001. The specimen consists of an incomplete, yet three-dimensionally preserved, skeleton, including remains of the skull, vertebral column, forelimb, and hindlimb.

In 2026, Jongyun Jung and colleagues described Doolysaurus huhmini as a new genus and species of thescelosaurid dinosaur based on these fossil remains, establishing KDRC-SA-V001 as the holotype specimen. The generic name, Doolysaurus, combines a reference to "Dooly the Little Dinosaur", a Korean cartoon dinosaur character, with the Ancient Greek σαῦρος (sauros), meaning 'lizard'. The specific name, huhmini, honors paleontologist Min Huh, and his contributions to dinosaur research in Korea. Min Huh founded the Korean Dinosaur Research Center when he was a professor of the Chonnam National University, and now incumbent Administrator of the Korea Heritage Service.

== Description ==
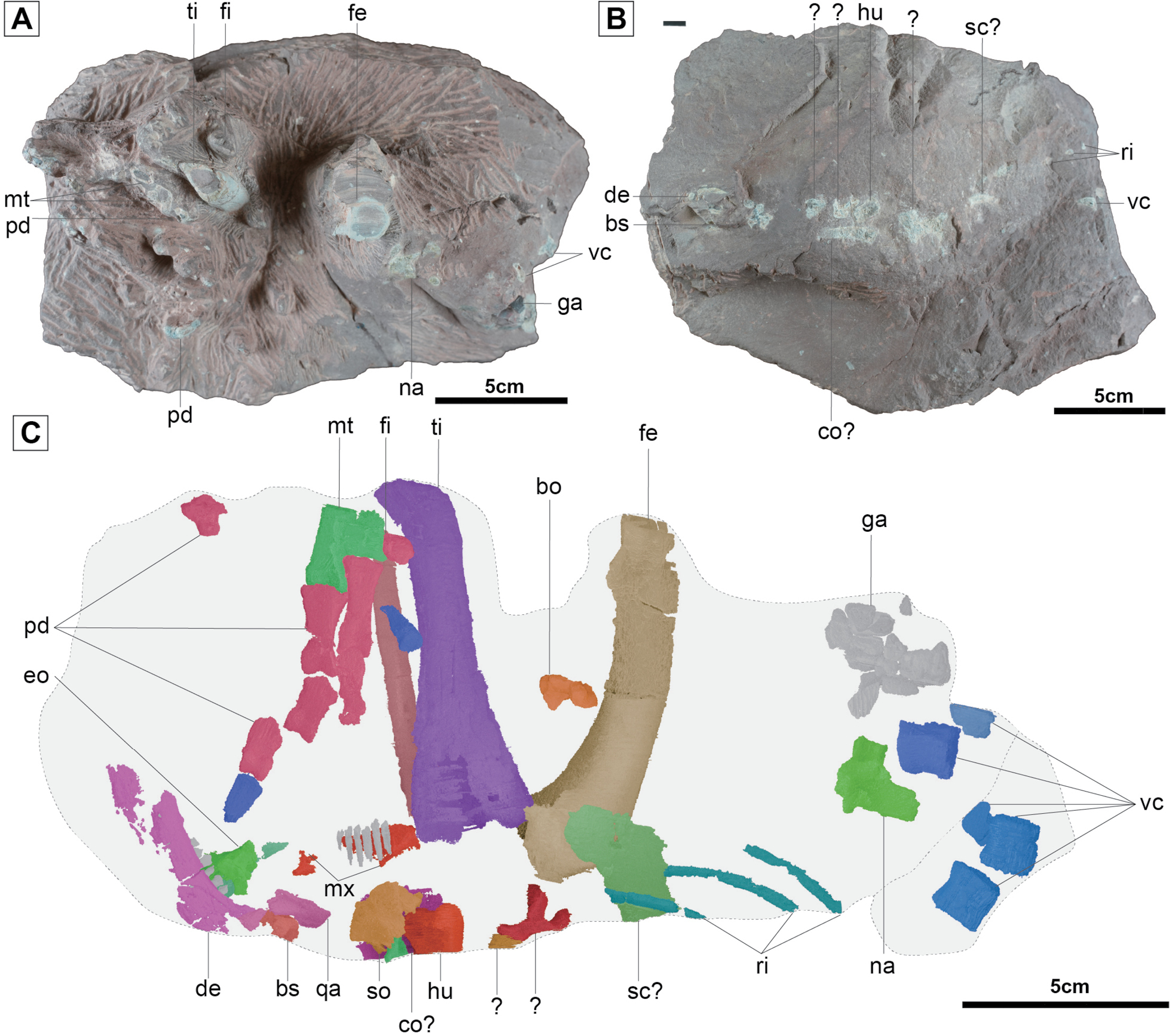
Holotype block (A, B) and CT rendering (C)

The holotype of Doolysaurus is estimated to have weighed 8.3 kg (18 lb) based on femoral circumference. It is thought to represent a juvenile individual under rapid growth at the time of death based on examining the cortical tissue of the femoral thin section, with no reduced vascularization towards the outer surface. The incomplete fusion and ossification of the cranial elements and the more bowed shape of the femur than that of other mature basal neornithischians also support this interpretation. Approximately 40–50 associated gastroliths, weighing a total of about 30.7 g (1.08 oz), were recovered with the specimen, and their subrounded shape suggesting that Doolysaurus may have had an omnivorous or opportunistic diet, with its gizzard being weaker than that of modern granivorous (seed-eating) birds.

== Classification ==
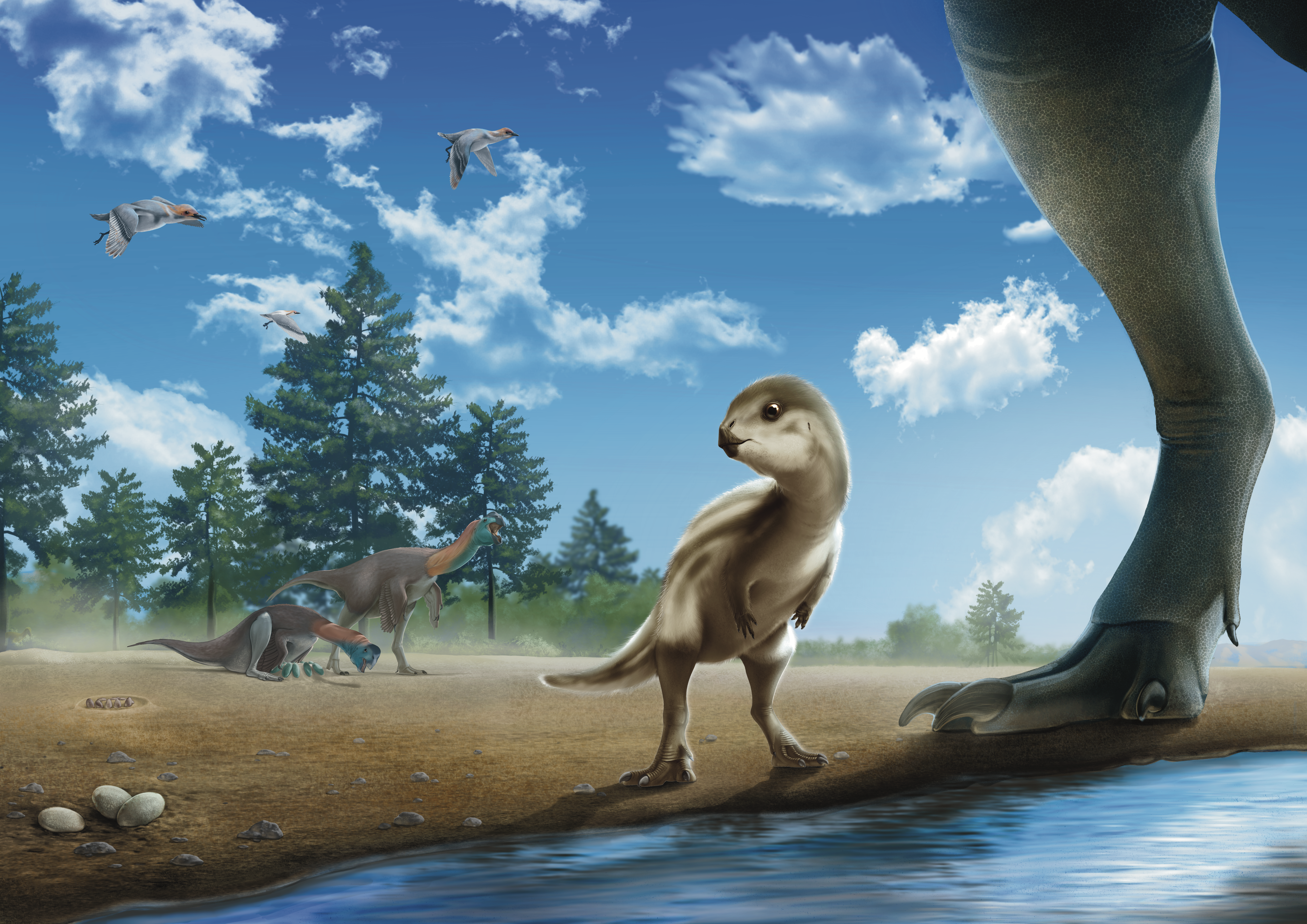
Reconstruction of Doolysaurus in its environment along other fauna

In their phylogenetic analyses, Jung et al. (2026) recovered Doolysaurus as a member of the family Thescelosauridae using the dataset of Fonseca et al. (2024). The strict consensus parsimony analysis recovered Doolysaurus in an unresolved position within the family, while the 50% majority-rule consensus parsimony analysis and the Bayesian analysis recovered it as a basal member of the subfamily Thescelosaurinae. The simplified results of the Bayesian analysis are displayed in the cladogram below:

- Thescelosauridae
  - Changmiania
  - - - Changchunsaurus
      - Jeholosaurus
    - Thescelosaurinae
      - Doolysaurus
      - - Fona
        - - Parksosaurus
          - - - CMN 8537
              - Thescelosaurus spp.
    - Orodrominae
      - Yueosaurus
      - Haya
      - Nevadadromeus
      - - Oryctodromeus
        - Zephyrosaurus
        - - - Albertadromeus
            - Koreanosaurus
        - - Orodromeus
          - RTMP 2008.45.2

When the sensitivity of the analysis based on the dataset of Fonseca et al. (2024) was tested with the dataset of Avrahami et al. (2024), Doolysaurus was also placed within Thescelosauridae in both the 50% majority-rule consensus parsimony analysis and the Bayesian analysis, the former of which recovered this taxon within Orodrominae and Koreanosaurus within Thescelosaurinae instead.

== Paleoenvironment ==
The Ilseongsan Formation is dated to the Albian–Cenomanian stages of the Early to early Late Cretaceous, and the paleoenvironment is interpreted as a floodplain with a crevasse splay. The fossil assemblage from the formation suggests a diverse ecosystem that included other groups of theropod dinosaurs, based on oofossils, including oviraptorosaurs, therizinosaurs, troodontids, and birds. The presence of gastroliths in Doolysaurus indicates that it may have foraged within this environment for both plant material and small food items, consistent with an omnivorous or opportunistic feeding strategy.
