= Shargaotis =

Shargaotis Temporal range: Middle Miocene, ~15–11.6 Ma

Scientific classification
- Kingdom: Animalia
- Phylum: Chordata
- Class: Aves
- Order: Otidiformes
- Family: Otididae
- Genus: †Shargaotis; Zelenkov, 2026
- Species: †S. ignipes

Binomial name
- †Shargaotis ignipes Zelenkov, 2026

Extinct bird genus

Shargaotis (lit. 'Sharga Otis') is an extinct genus of bird in the family Otididae (bustards), known the Middle Miocene of Mongolia. The genus contains a single species, Shargaotis ignipes, known from a fragment of a tibiotarsus. Shargaotis is most similar to the extant genera Otis and Chlamydotis, and is among the oldest known bustards in the fossil record.

== Discovery and naming ==
The Shargaotis fossil material was discovered at the 'Sharga locality', representing Miocene-dated outcrops in western Mongolia. It was collected as part of the Soviet / Russian–Mongolian Paleontological Expeditions, which were conducted in 1978, 1979, 1984, and 2001. The specimen is housed at the Paleontological Institute, part of the Russian Academy of Sciences, where it is permanently accessioned as specimen PIN, no. 4869/249. The specimen consists of the distalmost (toward the bottom) end of the left tibiotarsus, a lower leg bone.

In 2026, Russian palaeornithologist Nikita V. Zelenkov described Shargaotis ignipes as a new genus and species of extinct bustard based on these fossil remains, establishing PIN, no. 4869/249 as the holotype specimen. The generic name, Shargaotis, combines a reference to the type locality (Sharga) with Otis, the generic name of the closely related extant great bustard (Otis tarda). The specific name, ignipes, is derived from Latin roots meaning 'fiery-footed', and by extension, 'extremely fast'. This alludes to the Slavic name for bustards, which is derived from a Proto-Slavic word meaning 'fast-running bird'.

Three additional isolated bustard bone fragments are known from the Sharga locality, including PIN, no. 4869/250, a distal left tibiotarsus distinct from that of Shargaotis. This specimen is most similar to the extant bustard Lophotis. The second specimen, PIN, no. 4659/248, is the distal end of a carpometacarpus, likely belonging to an individual larger than the S. ignipes holotype. The third specimen, PIN, no. 4869/235, is the base phalanx forming the major wing finger. All three of these specimens were referred to Otididae gen. indet. (genus indeterminate) as they can not be referred to Shargaotis due to a lack of overlapping material with the holotype. However, the similarity of the latter two to Chlamydotis suggests they may be referrable to this taxon. Regardless, the existence of multiple bustard taxa in a single ecosystem would not be surprising, as this is observed in modern faunas.
