= Tenuicruris =

Tenuicruris Temporal range: Early Cretaceous, upper Albian
- Holotype specimen

Scientific classification
- Kingdom: Animalia
- Phylum: Chordata
- Class: Reptilia
- Clade: Dinosauria
- Clade: Saurischia
- Clade: Theropoda
- Clade: Avialae
- Clade: †Enantiornithes
- Genus: †Tenuicruris; White et al., 2026
- Species: †T. piscanexum

Binomial name
- †Tenuicruris piscanexum White et al., 2026

Extinct bird genus

Tenuicruris (teh-new-ee-KROO-ris; lit. 'slender leg') is an extinct genus of enantiornithean bird known from the Early Cretaceous (Albian age) Toolebuc Formation of Australia. The genus contains a single species, Tenuicruris piscanexum, known from a single isolated leg bone. It is the second Mesozoic bird named from Australia.

== Discovery and naming ==
Type locality (KKF1451 [●])

The Tenuicruris fossil material was discovered in outcrops of the Toolebuc Formation about 12 kilometres (7.5 mi) northwest of Richmond in Queensland, Australia. This site, called 'Dig Site 1', is a public fossicking area. The specimen is housed in the Kronosaurus Korner Museum, where it is permanently accessioned as specimen KK F1451. It consists of a nearly complete left tibiotarsus.

In 2026, Matt A. White and colleagues described Tenuicruris piscanexum as a new genus and species of enantiornithean based on these fossil remains, designating KK F1451 as the holotype specimen. The generic name, Tenuicruris, combines the Latin words tenuis, meaning 'slender', and cruris, meaning 'leg'. The specific name, piscanexum, is a combination of the Latin piscis, meaning 'fish', and nexum, meaning 'binding', alluding to the discovery of the holotype within the so-called 'fish mash' marker layer identified in Richmond fosskicking sites in. Prior to its description, the only fossil bird named from the Mesozoic of Australia was Nanantius, which is also known from an isolated tibiotarsus from the Toolebuc Formation.

== Description and classification ==
Life restoration

The T. piscanexum holotype tibiotarsus is 6.54 centimetres (2.57 in) long. In the coeval Nanantius, this bone is about half the size, at 3.14 cm (1.24 in). When scaled to the same length, this bone is notably more slender in Tenuicruris. Tenuicruris appears to be distinguishable from all other enantiornitheans by two autapomorphies (unique derived features): a deep fossa (depression) on the lateral (outer) surface of the tibiotarsus proximal to the distal condyle, and distal condyles that are flared when seen from behind.

White and colleagues (2026) included Tenuicruris in a phylogenetic matrix, but the substantial lack of scorable data for both Australian genera resulted in a large, unresolved polytomy of most included enantiornitheans. As Pengornithidae remained well-resolved at the base of Enantiornithes, White et al. regarded Tenuricruris as an indeterminate, non-pengornithid enantiornithean. They also noted various similarities, such as the presence of a prominent craniolateral cnemial crest, between Tenuicruris and Monoenantiornis and Qiliania, two Chinese taxa.

== See also ==
- Nanantius – a contemporary enantiorithean
