= Nanantius =

Nanantius Temporal range: Early Cretaceous, ~112–100 Ma
- Holotype tibiotarsus in multiple views

Scientific classification
- Kingdom: Animalia
- Phylum: Chordata
- Class: Reptilia
- Clade: Dinosauria
- Clade: Saurischia
- Clade: Theropoda
- Clade: Avialae
- Clade: †Enantiornithes
- Genus: †Nanantius; Molnar, 1986
- Species: †N. eos

Binomial name
- †Nanantius eos Molnar, 1986

Extinct genus of birds

Nanantius is a genus of extinct enantiornithean avialan ("bird" in the broad sense of the word) known from the Early Cretaceous (Albian, c. 100–112 mya) of Australia. Until the description of the contemporary Tenuicruris in 2026, Nanantius was the only named bird genus from the Cretaceous of Australia.

== Specimens and species ==
The only valid species of Nanantius is Nantantius eos, which was first described in 1986. A supposed second species, Nanantius valifanovi, has turned out to be a synonym of Gobipteryx minuta. N. eos was initially only known from an incomplete but elongated tibiotarsus and a cervical (neck) vertebra hailing from the Toolebuc Formation stratum. This holotype tibiotarsus (QM F12992) was found at Warra Station near Boulia, in Queensland.

In 1997, additional fossils from Canary Station in the same area of Australia were also placed into the genus Nanantius. One of these was a cervical (neck) vertebra, QM F12991, which was assigned to Nanantius eos. The other bone was a partial left tibiotarsus (QM F31813) which was assigned to Nanantius but not placed within Nanantius eos due to possessing a few anatomical differences.

In 2009, an unpublished dissertation written by Jingmai O'Connor reported that the holotype tibiotarsus and referred vertebra of N. eos have been lost. As it stands, Nanantius eos is one of the most fragmentary named species of enantiornithean.

== Description ==
Nanantius eos has been classified as an enanthiornithean, a Cretaceous group of primitive birds that did not survive the Cretaceous–Paleogene mass extinction. However, it is now known that the characters of the tibiotarsus are not sufficiently diagnostic to place a bird into the Enantiornithes. For example, the more modern genus Apsaravis also possessed an "enantiornithean" tibiotarsus. Thus, although an enantiornithine affinity of Nanantius is likely - these birds were the dominant avian group in the Early Cretaceous, and the tibiotarsus is very similar to the doubtlessly enantiornithine Gobipteryx -, this placement is not certain until more diagnostic material, such as the characteristic tarsometatarsi, have been found. In Hartman et 2019 supplementary it is noted that the construction of the tibiotarsus is more typical of enantiornitheans than ornithurine birds Nanantius is tentatively recorded as part of a clade closely related to Vorona, Grabauornis and Yungavolucris.

N. eos was a small species, about the size of a blackbird; it probably looked like a miniature gull with clawed wings and a neck and head more similar to that of a feathered theropod dinosaur. It presumably fed on marine invertebrates and small fish on the coast of what was then the Eromanga Sea, a shallow subtropical arm of the Tethys Seaway. The theory that Nanantius were seabirds is evidenced by the fact that another tibiotarsus referable to this genus, and quite possibly to N. eos itself, was found in the gut of an ichthyosaur with specimen number QM F16811.

== See also ==
- Tenuicruris – a contemporary enantiorithean
