= Mosaicoolithus =

Mosaicoolithus Temporal range: Albian-Cenomanian ~110–94 Ma

Egg fossil classification
- Oofamily: incertae sedis
- Oogenus: †Mosaicoolithus; Wang et al., 2011

Oospecies
- †M. zhangtoucaoensis Fang et al. 2000 (type)

Mosaicoolithus is an oogenus of fossil egg from the Cenomanian Chichengshan Formation (Tiantai Group) and Albian to Cenomanian Laijia Formation (Qujiang Group) of Tiantai County, Zhejiang Province in China. Its classification is uncertain. The eggs are spherical, and 8.8 cm in diameter. It is distinctive for having irregular pore canals, sometimes filled by secondary shell units. Originally, it was classified as two separate oospecies of Spheroolithus: S. zhangtoucaoensis and S. jincunensis. However, these oospecies were synonymized and placed into a new oogenus by Wang et al. (2011).
