= Ilseongsan Formation =

Geologic formation in South Korea

- Stratigraphic range: mid-Cretaceous (Albian–Cenomanian), ~113–97 Ma
- Type: Geological formation
- Underlies: Dalido Formation
- Overlies: Injiri Formation

Lithology
- Primary: Sandstone, mudstone, conglomerate

Location
- Coordinates: 34.8°N 126.4°E
- Approximate paleocoordinates: 34.2°N 122.8°E
- Region: South Jeolla Province
- Country: South Korea

Type section
- Named for: Ilseongsan, Haenam
- Named by: Lee and Lee, 1976
- Ilseongsan Formation (South Korea)

The Ilseongsan Formation (Korean: 일성산층; Hanja: 日星山層) is a mid-Cretaceous (Albian to lower Cenomanian) geologic formation in South Korea. Fossil records, including the ornithischian dinosaur Doolysaurus and diverse types of theropod eggs, have been reported.

== Geology ==
The Ilseongsan Formation is distributed from Haenam to Mokpo, and conformably overlies the Injiri Formation and is conformably overlain by the Dalido Formation. The lithology of the Ilseongsan Formation is mainly distinguished by the alternation of purple-grey sandstone and light-grey sandstone, intercalated with tuff or tuffaceous sandstones.

The depositional age of the Ilseongsan Formation was initially proposed as lower Campanian (83 to 77 Ma) of the Upper Cretaceous based on K-Ar dating of volcanic pebbles from conglomerate units of this formation and samples from an overlying tuff, but Kim et al. (2014) re-dated the tuff, now named the Maewoli Tuff which unconformably overlies the Dalido Formation, to 97.55 ± 0.62 Ma{ by using U-PB SHRIMP zircon analysis. It indicates that the underlying Dalido Formation, as well as the Injiri and Ilseongsan Formations, are older. Based on ostracods from the Dalido Formation, Choi et al. (2023) estimated the Dalido and Ilseongsan Formations from the Albian to the Cenomanian (~113 to 94 Ma). But, with the older age estimated of the Maewolli Tuff, the range of the Ilseongsan Formation is considered as Albian to early Cenomanian (~113 to 97 Ma) in age.

== Fossil content ==
Color key: Taxon / Reclassified taxon / Taxon falsely reported as present / Dubious taxon or junior synonym / Ichnotaxon / Ootaxon / Morphotaxon	Notes; Uncertain or tentative taxa are in small text; ~~crossed out~~ taxa are discredited.

=== Dinosaurs ===
==== Ornithischians ====
Ornithischians of the Ilseongsan Formation
Genus	Species	Location	Stratigraphic position	Material	Notes	Images
Doolysaurus	D. huhmini	Aphaedo	Albian to Cenomanian	Associated partial skeleton including cranial and postcranial material, in addition to gastroliths	A thescelosaurid ornithischian	

=== Oofossils ===
Oofossils of the Ilseongsan Formation
Genus	Species	Location	Stratigraphic position	Material	Notes	Images
Macroelongatoolithus	M. carlylei	Aphaedo	Albian to Cenomanian	Complete egg clutch	Likely laid by a giant oviraptorosaur	
Onggwanoolithus	O. aphaedoensis	Aphaedo	Albian to Cenomanian	Several eggs	Likely laid by ornithurine bird	
Dendroolithidae	indeterminate	Aphaedo	Albian to Cenomanian	Eggshells	Likely laid by therizinosaur	
Prismatoolithidae	Indeterminate	Aphaedo	Albian to Cenomanian	Eggshells	Likely laid by troodontid	
Elongatoolithidae	Indeterminate	Aphaedo	Albian to Cenomanian	Eggshells	Eggshell much thinner than Macroelongatoolithus from the same formation. Likely laid by oviraptorosaur.	

== See also ==
- List of stratigraphic units with dinosaur body fossils
