= Meterchen =

Meterchen Temporal range: Early Miocene

Scientific classification
- Kingdom: Animalia
- Phylum: Chordata
- Class: Aves
- Order: Anseriformes
- Family: Anatidae
- Genus: †Meterchen
- Species: †M. luti

Binomial name
- †Meterchen luti Tennyson et al., 2026

Extinct genus of duck

Meterchen is an extinct monotypic genus of anserine anatid that lived during the Burdigalian stage of the Miocene epoch.

== Etymology ==
The generic name Meterchen means 'mother goose' in Ancient Greek, and the specific epithet luti means 'of the mud' in Latin. The binomen therefore references the Mother Goose nursery rhyme where a mother goose rises up out of the mud.
