= Corvus venustus =

Corvus venustus Temporal range: 1.8–1.6 Ma

Scientific classification
- Kingdom: Animalia
- Phylum: Chordata
- Class: Aves
- Order: Passeriformes
- Family: Corvidae
- Genus: Corvus
- Species: †C. venustus

Binomial name
- †Corvus venustus Zelenkov, 2026

Extinct species of raven

Corvus venustus is an extinct species of raven of the genus Corvus from the Early Pleistocene (c. 1.8-1.6 Mya) of the Taurida Cave deposits of the central Crimean peninsula. It was described by Zelenkov (2026). Morphological analysis places it most similar to the modern thick-billed raven (C. crassirostris). C. venustus represents the first record of the group containing the African large-billed ravens, which includes the thick-billed raven (C. crassirostris) and the white-necked raven (C. albicollis) from the region, indicating a wider distribution of this clade of ravens during the Early Pleistocene.
