= 2017 in archosaur paleontology =

The year 2017 in archosaur paleontology was eventful. Archosaurs include the only living dinosaur group — birds — and the reptile crocodilians, plus all extinct dinosaurs, extinct crocodilian relatives, and pterosaurs. Archosaur palaeontology is the scientific study of those animals, especially as they existed before the Holocene Epoch began about 11,700 years ago. The year 2017 in paleontology included various significant developments regarding archosaurs.

This article records new taxa of fossil archosaurs of every kind that have been described during the year 2017, as well as other significant discoveries and events related to paleontology of archosaurs that occurred in the year 2017.

== General research ==
- A study on the evolution of forelimb anatomy, musculature and joint ranges of motion from early archosaurs to sauropodomorph dinosaurs based on data from Mussaurus patagonicus and extant freshwater crocodile is published by Otero et al. (2017).

== Pseudosuchians ==
=== Research ===
- A study on the evolutionary history and ecological correlates of bone ornamentation in extant and extinct pseudosuchians is published by Clarac et al. (2017).
- A redescription of the anatomy of the postcranial skeleton of Gracilisuchus stipanicicorum and a study on the phylogenetic relationships of the species is published by Lecuona, Desojo & Pol (2017).
- Description of partial ribs from the Late Triassic Vinita Formation (formerly Turkey Branch Formation; Virginia, United States), referred to Euscolosuchus olseni, is published by Scheyer & Sues (2017).
- A study on the phylogenetic relationships of Luperosuchus fractus is published by Nesbitt & Desojo (2017).
- A study on the bone histology and growth of Batrachotomus kupferzellensis is published by Klein, Foth & Schoch (2017).
- Crocodylomorph eggs and eggshells are described from the Late Jurassic Lourinhã Formation (Portugal) by Russo et al. (2017), who name new ootaxa Suchoolithus portucalensis and Krokolithes dinophilus.
- Tracks of a crocodyliform representing the ichnofamily Batrachopodidae are described from the Early Cretaceous (late Aptian) Calonda Formation (Angola) by Mateus et al. (2017), who name a new ichnotaxon Angolaichnus adamanticus.
- A description of a braincase assigned to Macelognathus vagans recovered from the Fruita Paleontological Area (Colorado, United States) and a study on the phylogenetic relationships of the species is published by Leardi, Pol & Clark (2017).
- A study on the changes in morphological diversity of the skulls of extinct and extant crocodyliforms through time is published by Wilberg (2017).
- A study on the impact of sea level variations and sea surface temperatures on the evolution of marine crocodylomorphs published by Martin et al. (2014) is re-evaluated by Jouve et al. (2017) on the basis of an updated dataset.
- Razanandrongobe sakalavae from the Middle Jurassic of Madagascar is interpreted as a member of Notosuchia by Dal Sasso et al. (2017).
- A description of the anatomy of the postcranial skeleton of Campinasuchus dinizi based on five specimens is published by Cotts et al. (2017).
- A study on the anatomy of the pectoral girdle and forelimb bones of Montealtosuchus arrudacamposi, as well as its implications for the locomotion habits of the animal, is published by Tavares et al. (2017).
- Postcranial remains of a goniopholidid, interpreted as remains of the second fossil specimen referable to Dakotasuchus kingi, are described from the Late Cretaceous (Cenomanian) Cedar Mountain Formation (Utah, United States) by Frederickson et al. (2017).
- Virtual cranial endocast of Pelagosaurus typus is reconstructed by Pierce, Williams & Benson (2017).
- A study on the mode of reproduction of metriorhynchids is published by Herrera et al. (2017).
- New fossils of a member of the dyrosaurid genus Guarinisuchus are described from the Paleocene Maria Farinha Formation (Brazil) by Sena et al. (2017).
- A study on the bone histology in the femora of two specimens attributed to Iberosuchus macrodon and its implications for the growth rate and resting metabolic rate in the species is published by Cubo, Köhler & de Buffrenil (2017).
- A specimen of a neosuchian crocodylomorph (probably a member of the genus Susisuchus) with extensively preserved epidermis and limb musculature is described from the Lower Cretaceous (Aptian) Crato Formation (Brazil) by Field & Martill (2017).
- An isolated mandible of a neosuchian possibly belonging or related to the family Hylaeochampsidae is described from the Middle Jurassic (Bathonian) Duntulm Formation (Isle of Skye, Scotland, United Kingdom) by Yi et al. (2017).
- Revision of the fragmentary eusuchian fossils from the Late Cretaceous of Western Europe, previously attributed to members of the species Allodaposuchus precedens, is published by Narváez et al. (2017).
- A study of the bone histology of a humerus of a eusuchian crocodyliform (possibly a member of the genus Acynodon) from the Late Cretaceous (Campanian) Laño quarry (northern Spain) and its implications for the skeletal growth pattern of the animal is published by Company & Pereda-Suberbiola (2017).
- A study comparing skull shape and inferring dietary preferences of crocodylians known from the Eocene Geiseltal-Fossillagerstätte (Germany), representing genera Diplocynodon, Asiatosuchus, Boverisuchus and Allognathosuchus, is published by Hastings & Hellmund (2017).
- A study on the anatomy of the braincase of Gryposuchus neogaeus is published by Bona, Carabajal & Gasparini (2017).
- A revision of the fossil material attributed to the Miocene caiman species Melanosuchus fisheri is published by Bona et al. (2017).
- New fossils of Baru wickeni and Baru darrowi are described from the Oligocene and Miocene of Australia by Yates (2017).
- A study on the evolution of locomotion of mekosuchines based on pectoral and pelvic girdles of mekosuchines recovered from the Eocene to Miocene sites in Australia is published by Stein et al. (2017).
- A review of the taxonomic diversity of the crocodiles from the early Pliocene of Kanapoi (Kenya) is published online by Brochu (2017).

=== New taxa ===
Name	Novelty	Status	Authors	Age	Unit	Location	Notes	Images
Cassissuchus	Gen. et sp. nov	Valid	Buscalioni	Early Cretaceous (Barremian)	Calizas de La Huérgina Formation	Spain	A member of the family Gobiosuchidae. The type species is C. sanziuami.	
Coahomasuchus chathamensis	Sp. nov	Valid	Heckert, Fraser & Schneider	Late Triassic	Pekin Formation	United States (North Carolina)	An aetosaur.	
Deltasuchus	Gen. et sp. nov	Valid	Adams, Noto & Drumheller	Late Cretaceous (Cenomanian)	Woodbine Formation	United States (Texas)	A neosuchian crocodylomorph related to Paluxysuchus newmani. The type species is D. motherali.	
Ieldraan	Gen. et sp. nov	Valid	Foffa et al.	Middle Jurassic (Callovian)	Oxford Clay Formation	United Kingdom	A member of the family Metriorhynchidae. Genus includes new species I. melkshamensis.	
Knoetschkesuchus	Gen. et sp. et comb. nov	Valid	Schwarz, Raddatz & Wings	Late Jurassic (Kimmeridgian)	Camadas de Guimarota; Süntel Formation	Germany; Portugal	A member of Atoposauridae. The type species is K. langenbergensis; genus also includes "Theriosuchus" guimarotae Schwarz & Salisbury (2005).	
Lemmysuchus	Gen. et comb. nov	Valid	Johnson et al.	Middle Jurassic (Callovian)	Oxford Clay	France; United Kingdom	A member of the family Teleosauridae; a new genus for "Steneosaurus" obtusidens Andrews (1909).	
Maomingosuchus	Gen. et comb. nov	Valid	Shan et al.	Eocene	Youganwo Formation	China	A new genus for "Tomistoma" petrolica Yeh (1958).	
Mourasuchus pattersoni	Sp. nov	Valid	Cidade et al.	Late Miocene	Urumaco Formation	Venezuela	A caiman.	
Turcosuchus	Gen. et sp. nov	Valid	Jouve et al.	Early Cretaceous (Barremian)	İncigez Formation	Turkey	A member of Crocodyliformes belonging to the family Hylaeochampsidae. The type species is T. okani.	

== Non-avian dinosaurs ==
=== Research ===
- Studies on the phylogenetic relationships of the dinosaurs are published by Baron, Norman & Barrett (2017) and Parry, Baron & Vinther (2017), recovering sister-group relationship between Ornithischia and Theropoda; the study of Baron, Norman & Barrett (2017) is subsequently reexamined by Langer et al. (2017).
- An investigation into common approaches used to identify sexual dimorphism in the fossil record is published by Mallon (2017), who argues that the available evidence precludes the detection of sexual dimorphism in non-avian dinosaurs.
- A study on the possible reasons why sexual dimorphism is rarely detected in non-avian dinosaurs, indicated by body-size data from the American alligator and the greater rhea, is published by Hone & Mallon (2017).
- A study on the impact of large herbivorous dinosaurs on global nutrient availability in the Cretaceous as indicated by remnant plant material (coal deposits) is published by Doughty (2017).
- A study on changes in morphological and biomechanical diversity of the mandibles of herbivorous dinosaurs through time, as well as its implications for the relationship between jaw shape, function, and ecological evolutionary drivers in the evolution of herbivorous dinosaurs, is published by MacLaren et al. (2017).
- A study on the anatomical diversity of the jugal bone in dinosaurs and its evolution is published by Sullivan & Xu (2017).
- A study on a diverse dinosaur ichnofauna from the Lower Cretaceous Broome Sandstone (Australia), including descriptions of six new ichnospecies, is published by Salisbury et al. (2017).
- Theropod tracks and potential heterodontosaurid tracks are described from the Lower Jurassic Elliot Formation (Lesotho) by Abrahams et al. (2017).
- Dinosaur footprints are reported from the Cretaceous Stanley Pool Formation (Gabon) by M'Voubou, Moussavou & Ligna (2017).
- Dinosaur trackways are reported from the Cretaceous (probably Cenomanian-Turonian) Mamfe Basin (Cameroon) by Martin et al. (2017).
- A re-evaluation of the purported Triassic dinosaur fossils from Poland discovered prior to the description of Silesaurus opolensis is published by Skawiński et al. (2017), who interpret Velocipes guerichi as a theropod dinosaur.
- A study evaluating whether reported set of unique collagen peptides of Tyrannosaurus rex and Brachylophosaurus canadensis could reflect cross-sample contamination from the modern reference material used is published by Buckley et al. (2017).
- A study on the relationship between step width and speed (stride length) in Late Triassic theropod trackways, its implications for non-avian theropod locomotion and for how it compared to bird and human locomotion is published by Bishop et al. (2017).
- A description and a study on the phylogenetic affinities of the theropod fossils recovered from the Early Cretaceous (Berriasian–Valanginian) Bajada Colorada Formation (Argentina) is published by Canale et al. (2017).
- Tracks of a giant theropod dinosaur are described from the Late Jurassic (Kimmeridgian) Reuchenette Formation (Switzerland) by Marty et al. (2017), who name a new ichnotaxon Jurabrontes curtedulensis.
- Tracks of a large theropod dinosaur are described from the Late Jurassic (Kimmeridgian) Reuchenette Formation (Switzerland) by Razzolini et al. (2017), who name a new ichnotaxon Megalosauripus transjuranicus.
- Tracks produced by large theropod dinosaurs (estimated body length >8–9 meters) are described from the Lower Jurassic upper Elliot Formation (Lesotho) by Sciscio et al. (2017), who name a new ichnotaxon Kayentapus ambrokholohali.
- Description of large dinosaur tracks (previously interpreted as ornithopod tracks) from the Cretaceous (Campanian) Cerro del Pueblo Formation (Coahuila, Mexico) is published by Rivera-Sylva et al. (2017), who reinterpret the tracks as produced by tetanuran (possibly tyrannosaurid) theropods, and consider the tracks to be likely evidence of a gregarious behaviour of the trackmakers.
- A study on the diversity and phylogenetic relationships of the Late Jurassic theropod dinosaurs known from the isolated teeth recovered from the Lusitanian Basin (Portugal) is published by Malafaia et al. (2017).
- A study on the relations between the tooth size, shape and position on the skull and mandible and the bite force of theropod dinosaurs is published by Monfroy (2017).
- Small bird-like theropod tracks assigned to the ichnogenus Trisauropodiscus are described from the Middle Jurassic (Bajocian-Bathonian) Imilchil Formation (Morocco) by Gierliński et al. (2017), who interpret Trisauropodiscus as an ichnotaxon distinct from Anomoepus and as a possible predecessor of Carmelopodus and ornithomimipodid morphotypes.
- A fragmentary theropod egg is described from the Lower Cretaceous Ilek Formation (Kemerovo Oblast, Russia) by Skutschas et al. (2017), who name a new ootaxon Prismatoolithus ilekensis.
- A study on the ontogenetic changes in the skeleton of Limusaurus inextricabilis as indicated by the anatomy of the skeletons of 19 specimens representing six ontogenetic stages is published by Wang et al. (2017).
- New description of the morphology of Pycnonemosaurus nevesi and a study of the phylogenetic relationships of the species is published by Delcourt (2017).
- Detailed maps of the musculature of the forelimbs of Majungasaurus crenatissimus are created by Burch (2017).
- A review of taxonomy and revised definitions of members of the family Spinosauridae, as well as a study on their ecology and behaviour is published by Hone & Holtz (2017).
- A partial spinosaurid tooth is described from the Early Cretaceous (Berriasian–Valanginian) Feliz Deserto Formation (Brazil) by Sales et al. (2017), representing the oldest known occurrence of a spinosaurid from South America so far.
- A reappraisal of spinosaurid skull materials from Brazil is published by Sales & Schultz (2017), who interpret the holotype specimens of Irritator challengeri and Angaturama limai as fossils of different individuals.
- Description of a series of tail vertebrae of Allosaurus fragilis, preserving sulci interpreted as origin attachment sites of the caudofemoralis longus muscle, is published by Cau & Serventi (2017).
- A study on the skull morphology of Neovenator salerii, indicating presence of a complex network of large, anastomosing canals in the premaxilla and maxilla (interpreted as part of the neurovascular system), is published by Barker et al. (2017).
- A description of the braincase anatomy of Murusraptor barrosaensis is published by Paulina-Carabajal & Currie (2017).
- A study on the integumentary structures of Sinosauropteryx, rejecting their interpretation as degraded collagen fibres, is published by Smithwick et al. (2017).
- Smithwick et al. (2017) reconstruct the color patterns of Sinosauropteryx, presenting evidence of presence of countershading and a stripe across the eye in this theropod.
- Partial metatarsus of a non-tyrannosaurid tyrannosauroid theropod distinct from Appalachiosaurus montgomeriensis and Dryptosaurus aquilunguis is described from the Upper Cretaceous (Campanian) Merchantville Formation (Delaware, United States) by Brownstein (2017) and Dalman, Jasinski & Lucas (2017).
- A description of the preserved fossil integument of tyrannosaurid theropods, confirming presence of scaly skin, is published by Bell et al. (2017).
- A study on the lateral grooves in the dentaries of albertosaurine tyrannosaurids is published by Rothschild & Naples (2017), who interpret the grooves as indicating that albertosaurines had a sensory organ analogous to the lateral line of fish, which might have helped in determining the direction of the wind (and thus determining the origin of a detected smells).
- A study on the feeding behaviour of Tyrannosaurus rex and the factors that enabled members of this species to pulverize bones before eating them is published by Gignac & Erickson (2017).
- A study on the running abilities of Tyrannosaurus rex is published by Sellers et al. (2017).
- A description of Early Cretaceous ornithomimosaur fossils recovered from the Arundel Clay (Maryland, United States) is published by Brownstein (2017), who also reinterprets Nedcolbertia justinhofmanni as a basal member of Ornithomimosauria; the author's interpretation of the fossils as indicative of the presence of two ornithomimosaur taxa in the Arundel is subsequently criticized by McFeeters, Ryan & Cullen (2018).
- Fossils of an ornithomimosaur considered to be a member of the genus Qiupalong of uncertain specific assignment are described from the Late Cretaceous (Campanian) Belly River Group strata in Dinosaur Provincial Park (Alberta, Canada) by McFeeters et al. (2017), representing the first North American occurrence of a member of this genus.
- Alvarezsaurid fossils are described from the Upper Cretaceous (Turonian) Bissekty Formation (Uzbekistan) by Averianov & Sues (2017), representing the oldest record of the family in the Northern Hemisphere reported so far.
- A study on the feeding behavior and niche differentiation in therizinosaurs as indicated by the morphology of their mandibles is published by Lautenschlager (2017).
- Putative therizinosaur tracks are described from the Late Cretaceous of Morocco by Masrour, Lkebir & Pérez-Lorente (2017).
- A study on the histology of the teeth of Suzhousaurus megatherioides and Falcarius utahensis, as well as on its implications for the evolution of therizinosaur teeth, is published by Button et al. (2017).
- A specimen of the tick species Cornupalpatum burmanicum entangled in a pennaceous feather of an early bird or non-avian pennaraptoran theropod is described from the Cretaceous amber from Myanmar by Peñalver et al. (2017).
- Wang et al. (2017) identify the truncation of tooth development during postnatal ontogeny in a caenagnathid oviraptorosaur and the Early Cretaceous bird Sapeornis, and interpret it as indicative of links between dental reduction and beak evolution in theropod dinosaurs.
- A study on the incubation temperature of oviraptorosaur eggs recovered from the Upper Cretaceous Nanxiong Formation (China) is published by Amiot et al. (2017).
- A study on the skull morphology of Avimimus portentosus based on a new specimen is published by Tsuihiji et al. (2017).
- A description of the anatomy of the mandible of Gigantoraptor erlianensis is published by Ma et al. (2017).
- Wiemann et al. (2017) report the discovery of eggshell pigments in the eggs of Late Cretaceous oviraptorid ootaxon Macroolithus yaotunensis, which belonged to Heyuannia huangi.
- An osteological description of the skull of the holotype specimen of Buitreraptor gonzalezorum is published by Gianechini, Makovicky & Apesteguía (2017).
- Description of the anatomy of the skeleton of Neuquenraptor argentinus is published by Brissón Egli et al. (2017).
- Wang et al. (2017) reconstruct the body outline of Anchiornis huxleyi based on the data on soft tissues revealed by laser-stimulated fluorescence imaging.
- Description of four new specimens of Anchiornis huxleyi and a study on the phylogenetic relationships of the species is published by Pei et al. (2017).
- A study on the evolution of the sauropodomorph feeding apparatus is published by Button, Barrett & Rayfield (2017).
- A study on the bone microstructure of sauropodomorph dinosaurs and on its implications for the growth patterns of basal sauropodomorphs is published by Cerda et al. (2017).
- A study on the shape differences among sauropodomorph humeri and femora and their implications for the posture and limb mobility of titanosauriform sauropods is published by Ullmann, Bonnan & Lacovara (2017).
- Sauropodomorph (including possible sauropod) tracks are described from the Upper Triassic Fleming Fjord Formation (Greenland) by Lallensack et al. (2017).
- A revision of the biostratigraphy and morphological and taxonomic diversity of the sauropodomorph fauna from the Elliot Formation (South Africa) is published by Mcphee et al. (2017), who interpret Antetonitrus ingenipes as an Early Jurassic taxon (rather than Triassic one as originally assumed).
- An isolated sauropodomorph tooth with a combination of features present in non-sauropod sauropodomorphs and sauropods is described from the Jurassic Cañadón Asfalto Formation (Argentina) by Becerra, Gomez & Pol (2017).
- Reconstruction of the braincase of Saturnalia tupiniquim, based on a specimen preserving skull elements (including the bones that form the braincase), is presented by Bronzati et al. (2017).
- Protein remains preserved in skeletal elements of an Early Jurassic sauropodomorph dinosaur Lufengosaurus are described by Lee et al. (2017).
- A sauropod tooth is described from the Santonian Csehbánya Formation (Hungary) by Ősi, Csiki-Sava & Prondvai (2017), representing the first known sauropod body fossil from the Santonian of Europe.
- Plant remains found in the Late Cretaceous (Maastrichtian) Lameta sediments and associated sauropod coprolites from the Nand-Dongargaon basin (Maharashtra, India) are described by Sonkusare, Samant & Mohabey (2017), providing information on the diet of sauropod dinosaurs.
- A study on the maximum vertical reach of sauropod necks is published by Paul (2017).
- A study on the condyle convexity and range of motion of the joints situated between the vertebrae of the sauropod dinosaurs as indicated by comparison with extant alligators is published by Fronimos & Wilson (2017).
- A study evaluating the utility of secondary osteons in inferring the ontogenetic stages of sauropod specimens is published by Mitchell, Sander & Stein (2017).
- Skin impression preserved in a sauropod footprint from the Cretaceous (Albian) Haman Formation (South Korea) is described by Paik et al. (2017).
- New sauropod fossil material is described from the Lower Jurassic Nam Phong Formation (Thailand) by Laojumpon et al. (2017).
- A study on the complexity pattern of the neurocentral sutures in the vertebrae of Spinophorosaurus nigerensis and its implications for the stress distribution in the vertebrae of this sauropod is published by Fronimos & Wilson (2017).
- A study on the bifurcated spines in the neck vertebrae of diplodocid sauropods, their implications for the reconstruction of soft tissues associated with bifurcated spines and on the neck posture of diplodocid sauropods, is published by Woodruff (2017).
- A study on the morphological and histological features of the skeleton that can be used to determine maturity in diplodocid sauropods is published by Woodruff, Fowler & Horner (2017).
- Five partial vertebrae of a subadult specimen of Barosaurus are described from the Late Jurassic (Kimmeridgian) Morrison Formation (the Carnegie Quarry of Dinosaur National Monument; Utah, United States) by Hanik, Lamanna & Whitlock (2017).
- A study on the postcranial skeletal pneumaticity in rebbachisaurid sauropods, based primarily on the vertebrae of Katepensaurus goicoecheai, is published by Ibiricu et al. (2017), who report a form of pneumaticity that has not previously been observed in sauropods.
- A revision of the sauropod fossil material from the Lower Cretaceous (Barremian) Arcillas de Morella Formation (Spain), indicating presence of at least three sauropod taxa, is published by Mocho et al. (2017).
- A study on the anatomy of the teeth of a specimen of Camarasaurus recovered from the Howe-Stephens Quarry (Bighorn Basin, Wyoming, United States) is published by Wiersma & Sander (2017).
- Partial skeleton of Camarasaurus is described from the Little Snowy Mountains (Montana, United States) by Woodruff & Foster (2017), representing the northernmost occurrence of a sauropod in the Morrison Formation reported so far.
- New information on the anatomy of the lectotype specimen of Lusotitan atalaiensis and a study on the phylogenetic relationships of the species is published by Mocho, Royo-Torres & Ortega (2017).
- Description of new fossils referrable to the type individual of Austrosaurus mckillopi and reassessment of the fossil material attributed to members of this species is published by Poropat et al. (2017).
- A study on the histology of the bony structures found with the holotype specimen of Agustinia ligabuei is published by Bellardini & Cerda (2017), who argue that these structures are not osteoderms and that there is no evidence of the presence of dermal armor in Agustinia.
- Tail vertebrae of a titanosaur sauropod affected by osteomyelitis is described from the Late Cretaceous (Campanian) Anacleto Formation (Argentina) by de García et al. (2017).
- Bone abnormalities (interpreted as pathologies) present in the skeleton of the type specimen of Bonitasaura salgadoi are described by Gonzalez, Gallina & Cerda (2017).
- A study on the internal anatomy of the titanosaur osteoderms recovered from the Late Cretaceous site of Lo Hueco (Spain) and the function of titanosaur dermal armor is published by Vidal et al. (2017).
- A description of new fossil material of Alamosaurus sanjuanensis (an articulated series of cervical vertebrae from Big Bend National Park, Texas) and a study of phylogenetic relationships of this species is published by Tykoski & Fiorillo (2017).
- A study on the osteology and positional assignment of the dorsal vertebrae of Dreadnoughtus schrani is published by Voegele, Lamanna & Lacovara (2017).
- A study on pathologic titanosaurian eggs from several Upper Cretaceous basins in southwestern Europe is published by Sellés, Vila & Galobart (2017), who interpret the abundance of abnormal eggs as probably caused by a dinosaur faunal replacement at the end of early Maastrichtian (circa 71-70 million years ago).
- A redescription of the postcranial material of Lesothosaurus diagnosticus is published by Baron, Norman & Barrett (2017), who argue that Stormbergia dangershoeki is most likely a junior synonym of L. diagnosticus.
- A mandible recovered from the Lower Jurassic upper Elliot Formation (South Africa), assigned to Lesothosaurus diagnosticus, is digitally reconstructed in 3D by Sciscio et al. (2017).
- A study on the phylogenetic relationships of the stegosaurians is published by Raven & Maidment (2017).
- A study on the purported stegosaur fossils from the Middle Jurassic (Aalenian-Bajocian) Inferior Oolite Group (United Kingdom) is published by Galton (2017).
- A study on the purported stegosaurian dermal plate from the Upper Cretaceous (Maastrichtian) Kallamedu Formation (India) is published by Galton & Ayyasami (2017).
- A well-preserved stegosaurian sacrum with paired ilia, referred to the species Wuerhosaurus ordosensis and providing new information on the anatomy of the pelvic girdle of the taxon, is described from the Lower Cretaceous Luohandong Formation (China), is described by Hou & Ji (2017), who interpret the finding as confirming that Wuerhosaurus ordosensis and Wuerhosaurus homheni are different species.
- Moment arms of muscles of Stegosaurus stenops are calculated by Brassey, Maidment & Barrett (2017).
- A study on the anatomical features related to feeding and the mechanisms of food processing in ankylosaurian dinosaurs is published by Ősi et al. (2017).
- Description of a new specimen of Crichtonpelta benxiensis (nearly completely preserved skull) from the Cretaceous (late Albian–Turonian) Sunjiawan Formation (China) and a study on the phylogenetic relationships of the species is published by Yang et al. (2017).
- A study on the skeletal anatomy of Ankylosaurus magniventris, reinterpreting previously established aspects of the anatomy of members of the species, is published by Arbour & Mallon (2017).
- A study on the length of the incubation period in Hypacrosaurus stebingeri and Protoceratops andrewsi is published by Erickson et al. (2017).
- A study on the ornithischian teeth known from the Upper Cretaceous Csehbánya Formation (Hungary) is published by Virág & Ősi (2017), attributing some of the teeth to the genus Mochlodon and some to the genus Ajkaceratops (the first teeth that can provisionally be referred to the latter genus).
- A naturally occurring brain endocast of an iguanodontian ornithopod (possibly Barilium or Hypselospinus), preserving mineralized brain soft tissues, is described from the Early Cretaceous (Valanginian) Tunbridge Wells Sand Formation (United Kingdom) by Brasier et al. (2017).
- A study on the formation of tooth enamel in Lanzhousaurus magnidens is published by Suarez et al. (2017).
- A study on the individual variation in the morphology of the postcranial skeleton of Iguanodon bernissartensis is published by Verdú et al. (2017), who consider Delapparentia turolensis to be impossible to distinguish from Iguanodon species based on the available material.
- Description of the osteology of the skeleton of a specimen of Ouranosaurus nigeriensis exhibited at the Natural History Museum of Venice is published by Bertozzo, Dalla Vecchia & Fabbri (2017).
- A description of a new specimen of Eolambia caroljonesa and a study on the phylogenetic relationships of the species is published by McDonald et al. (2017).
- A redescription of the skull anatomy of Edmontosaurus regalis and a study on the phylogenetic relationships of hadrosaurids is published by Xing, Mallon & Currie (2017).
- A study on the taphonomy of the Standing Rock Hadrosaur Site, a vast Edmontosaurus annectens bone bed from the Upper Cretaceous (Maastrichtian) Hell Creek Formation (South Dakota, United States) is published by Ullmann et al. (2017).
- Redescription of a specimen of Gryposaurus notabilis from the Upper Cretaceous Dinosaur Park Formation (Alberta, Canada) housed at the Milan Natural History Museum and a paleopathological analysis of the specimen is published by Bertozzo et al. (2017).
- Schroeter et al. (2017) reevaluate collagen I peptides recovered from a specimen of Brachylophosaurus canadensis in 2009 and recover additional eight peptide sequences of collagen I from the same specimen.
- An isolated dentary and postcranial skeleton from Dinosaur Provincial Park (Alberta, Canada) is interpreted as likely representing the same skeleton as the holotype skull of Corythosaurus excavatus by Bramble et al. (2017).
- A study on the histology of two hadrosaurid dentary dental batteries from the Upper Cretaceous of Dinosaur Provincial Park (Alberta, Canada) and its implications for inferring the tooth movement within the hadrosaurid dental battery is published by Bramble et al. (2017).
- A study on the fossilized feces (coprolites) recovered from the Cretaceous Kaiparowits Formation (Utah, United States), produced by large herbivorous dinosaurs (most likely hadrosaurs), is published by Chin, Feldmann & Tashman (2017), who report evidence indicating that the dinosaurs that produced the coprolites consumed crustaceans and rotted wood.
- A study on the morphological diversity of the snouts and frills of the ceratopsians, as well as on the skull and jaw shape changes in the evolution of the group is published by Maiorino et al. (2017).
- New specimen of Liaoceratops yanzigouensis is described from the Lujiatun Bed of the Lower Cretaceous Yixian Formation (China) by Yang et al. (2017), who describe the postcranial skeleton of L. yanzigouensis for the first time.
- An isolated ceratopsid tooth is described from the Late Cretaceous (late Maastrichtian) Owl Creek Formation (Mississippi, United States) by Farke & Phillips (2017), representing the first reported occurrence of a ceratopsid from eastern North America.
- A study on correlating the microstructure and nanostructure from femoral bones of Koreanosaurus through electron microscopy is published by Kim et al. (2017).
- A study on the microstructure and chemistry of a fossil rib of Koreanosaurus boseongenesis, its hosting mudstone, and the boundary in-between, intending to establish the factors that contributed to diagenesis and the preservation of fossil bone, is published by Kim et al. (2017).
- A study on Dinosaur Park troodonts concludes that Troodon is a nomen dubium, revives Stenonychosaurus and names a new genus, Latenivenatrix.
- Chilesaurus diegosuarezi, considered to be a theropod dinosaur by the authors of its description, is reinterpreted as a basal ornithischian by Baron & Barrett (2017).
- A study on the forelimb posture of four articulated specimens of Chilesaurus diegosuarezi from the Late Jurassic Toqui Formation (Chile) is published by Chimento et al. (2017).
- Closely associated theropod and probable hadrosaur eggs are described from the Upper Cretaceous (Maastrichtian) St. Mary River Formation (Montana, United States) by Jackson & Varricchio (2017), who name a new theropod ootaxon Tetonoolithus nelsoni.

=== New taxa ===
Name	Novelty	Status	Authors	Age	Unit	Location	Notes	Images
Aepyornithomimus	Gen. et sp. nov		Tsogtbaatar et al.	Late Cretaceous (Campanian)	Djadochta Formation	Mongolia	An ornithomimid theropod. The type species is A. tugrikinensis.	
Afromimus	Gen. et sp. nov	Valid	Sereno	Early Cretaceous (Aptian-Albian)	Elrhaz Formation	Niger	A theropod dinosaur of uncertain phylogenetic placement. Originally classified as an ornithomimosaur, but subsequently argued to be an abelisauroid closely related to Masiakasaurus. The type species is A. tenerensis.	
Albertavenator	Gen. et sp. nov	Valid	Evans et al.	Late Cretaceous (Maastrichtian)	Horseshoe Canyon Formation	Canada (Alberta)	A troodontid paravian theropod. The type species is A. curriei.	
Almas	Gen. et sp. nov	Valid	Pei et al.	Late Cretaceous	Djadochta Formation	Mongolia	A troodontid theropod. Genus includes new species A. ukhaa.	
Avimimus nemegtensis	Sp. nov	Valid	Funston et al.	Late Cretaceous	Nemegt Formation	Mongolia	An oviraptorosaurian. Announced in 2017; the final version of the article naming it was published in 2018.	
Beibeilong	Gen. et sp. nov	Valid	Pu et al.	Late Cretaceous (Cenomanian—Turonian)	Gaogou Formation	China	A caenagnathid oviraptorosaur theropod. The type species is B. sinensis.	
Bonapartesaurus	Gen. et sp. nov	Valid	Cruzado-Caballero & Powell	Late Cretaceous (late Campanian–early Maastrichtian)	Allen Formation	Argentina	A hadrosaurid ornithopod belonging to the subfamily Saurolophinae and the tribe Austrokritosauria. The type species is B. rionegrensis.	
Borealopelta	Gen. et sp. nov	Valid	Brown et al.	Early Cretaceous (Aptian)	Clearwater Formation	Canada (Alberta)	A nodosaurid thyreophoran. The type species is B. markmitchelli.	
Burianosaurus	Gen. et sp. nov	Valid	Madzia, Boyd & Mazuch	Late Cretaceous (Cenomanian)	Peruc-Korycany Formation	Czech Republic	A basal ornithopod. The type species is B. augustai.	
Chenanisaurus	Gen. et sp. nov	Valid	Longrich et al.	Late Cretaceous (late Maastrichtian)	Ouled Abdoun Basin	Morocco	An abelisaurid theropod. The type species is C. barbaricus.	
Choconsaurus	Gen. et sp. nov	Valid	Simón, Salgado & Calvo	Late Cretaceous (Cenomanian)	Huincul Formation	Argentina	A titanosaur sauropod. The type species is C. baileywillisi. Announced in 2017; the final version of the article naming it was published in 2018.	
Corythoraptor	Gen. et sp. nov		Lü et al.	Late Cretaceous (Campanian-Maastrichtian)	Nanxiong Formation	China	An oviraptorid theropod. The type species is C. jacobsi.	
Daliansaurus	Gen. et sp. nov	Valid	Shen et al.	Early Cretaceous	Yixian Formation	China	A troodontid theropod. The type species is D. liaoningensis.	
Daspletosaurus horneri	Sp. nov		Carr et al.	Late Cretaceous	Two Medicine Formation	United States (Montana)	A tyrannosaurid theropod	
Europatitan	Gen. et sp. nov	Valid	Torcida Fernández-Baldor et al.	Early Cretaceous (late Barremian–early Aptian)	Castrillo de la Reina Formation	Spain	A sauropod belonging to the group Somphospondyli. The type species is E. eastwoodi.	
Galeamopus pabsti	Sp. nov	Valid	Tschopp & Mateus	Late Jurassic	Morrison Formation	United States (Colorado; Wyoming)	A diplodocid sauropod.	
Halszkaraptor	Gen. et sp. nov	Valid	Cau et al.	Late Cretaceous (Campanian)	Djadochta Formation	Mongolia	A dromaeosaurid theropod. The type species is H. escuilliei.	
Isaberrysaura	Gen. et sp. nov		Salgado et al.	Middle Jurassic (Bajocian)	Los Molles Formation	Argentina	A probable stegosaur, originally identified as an early ornithischian of uncertain phylogenetic placement. The type species is I. mollensis.	
Jianianhualong	Gen. et sp. nov	Valid	Xu et al.	Early Cretaceous	Yixian Formation	China	A troodontid theropod. The type species is J. tengi.	
Laiyangosaurus	Gen. et sp. nov	Valid	Zhang et al.	Late Cretaceous	Jingangkou Formation	China	A hadrosaurid ornithopod belonging to the subfamily Saurolophinae and the tribe Edmontosaurini. The type species is L. youngi. Announced in 2017; the final version of the article naming it was published in 2019.	
Latenivenatrix	Gen. et sp. nov	Valid	Van der Reest & Currie	Late Cretaceous (Campanian)	Dinosaur Park Formation	Canada (Alberta)	A troodontid theropod. The type species is L. mcmasterae.	
Liaoningvenator	Gen. et sp. nov	Valid	Shen et al.	Early Cretaceous (Hauterivian)	Yixian Formation	China	A troodontid theropod. The type species is L. curriei.	
Lucianovenator	Gen. et sp. nov	Valid	Martínez & Apaldetti	Late Triassic (late Norian—Rhaetian)	Quebrada del Barro Formation	Argentina	A coelophysid theropod. The type species is L. bonoi.	
Matheronodon	Gen. et sp. nov	Valid	Godefroit et al.	Late Cretaceous (late Campanian)		France	A rhabdodontid ornithopod. The type species is M. provincialis.	
Mierasaurus	Gen. et sp. nov		Royo-Torres et al.	Early Cretaceous (late Berriasian-early Aptian)	Cedar Mountain Formation	United States (Utah)	A turiasaur sauropod. The type species is M. bobyoungi.	
Moabosaurus	Gen. et sp. nov	Valid	Britt et al.	Early Cretaceous (Aptian)		United States (Utah)	A turiasaur sauropod. The type species is M. utahensis.	
Ostromia	Gen. et comb. nov		Foth & Rauhut	Late Jurassic (early Tithonian)	Painten Formation	Germany	A paravian theropod, possibly a relative of Anchiornis. The type species is "Pterodactylus" crassipes von Meyer (1857).	
Pandoravenator	Gen. et sp. nov	Valid	Rauhut & Pol	Late Jurassic	Cañadón Calcáreo Formation	Argentina	A basal tetanuran theropod of uncertain phylogenetic placement. The type species is P. fernandezorum.	
Patagotitan	Gen. et sp. nov	Valid	Carballido et al.	Early Cretaceous (Albian)	Cerro Barcino Formation	Argentina	A titanosaur sauropod belonging to the group Lognkosauria. The type species is P. mayorum.	
Powellvenator	Gen. et sp. nov	Valid	Ezcurra	Late Triassic (Norian)	Los Colorados Formation	Argentina	A coelophysoid theropod. The type species is P. podocitus.	
Serikornis	Gen. et sp. nov	Valid	Lefèvre et al.	Late Jurassic (Oxfordian)	Tiaojishan Formation	China	A paravian theropod. The type species is S. sungei.	
Shingopana	Gen. et sp. nov	Valid	Gorscak et al.	Cretaceous (late Campanian–early Maastrichtian)	Galula Formation	Tanzania	A titanosaur sauropod. The type species is S. songwensis.	
Shuangbaisaurus	Gen. et sp. nov	Valid	Wang et al.	Early Jurassic	Fengjiahe Formation	China	A basal theropod. The type species is S. anlongbaoensis.	
Soriatitan	Gen. et sp. nov	Valid	Royo-Torres et al.	Early Cretaceous (late Hauterivian–early Barremian)	Golmayo Formation	Spain	A brachiosaurid sauropod. The type species is S. golmayensis.	
Tarchia teresae	Sp. nov	Valid	Penkalski & Tumanova	Late Cretaceous		Mongolia	A member of Ankylosauridae.	
Teihivenator	Gen. et comb. nov	Disputed	Yun	Late Cretaceous (late Campanian-early Maastrichtian)	Navesink Formation	United States (New Jersey)	A tyrannosauroid theropod; a new genus for "Laelaps" macropus Cope (1868). Considered to be a nomen dubium by Brownstein (2017), who interpreted the fossil material of this taxon as a mixture of ornithomimosaur and tyrannosauroid hindlimb elements.	
Tengrisaurus	Gen. et sp. nov	Valid	Averianov & Skutschas	Early Cretaceous (Barremian-Aptian)	Murtoi Formation	Russia	A lithostrotian titanosaur sauropod. The type species is T. starkovi.	
Triunfosaurus	Gen. et sp. nov	Valid	Carvalho et al.	Early Cretaceous (Berriasian-early Hauterivian)	Rio Piranhas Formation	Brazil	A sauropod dinosaur. Originally interpreted as a basal titanosaur, subsequently considered to be a member of Somphospondyli of uncertain phylogenetic placement by Poropat et al. (2017). The type species is T. leonardii.	
Vouivria	Gen. et sp. nov	Valid	Mannion, Allain & Moine	Late Jurassic (Oxfordian)	Calcaires de Clerval Formation	France	A brachiosaurid sauropod. The type species is V. damparisensis.	
Xingxiulong	Gen. et sp. nov		Wang, You & Wang	Early Jurassic	Lufeng Formation	China	A basal member of Sauropodiformes. The type species is X. chengi.	
Yehuecauhceratops	Gen. et sp. nov	Valid	Rivera-Sylva et al.	Late Cretaceous	Aguja Formation	Mexico	A centrosaurine ceratopsian. The type species is Y. mudei.	
Zhongjianosaurus	Gen. et sp. nov	Valid	Xu & Qin	Early Cretaceous	Possibly Yixian Formation	China	A dromaeosaurid theropod. The type species is Z. yangi.	
Zhuchengtitan	Gen. et sp. nov	Valid	Mo et al.	Late Cretaceous	Wangshi Group	China	A titanosaur sauropod. The type species is Z. zangjiazhuangensis.	
Zuoyunlong	Gen. et sp. nov	Valid	Wang et al.	Late Cretaceous (Cenomanian)	Zhumapu Formation	China	A basal member of Hadrosauroidea. The type species is Z. huangi.	
Zuul	Gen. et sp. nov	Valid	Arbour & Evans	Late Cretaceous (Campanian)	Judith River Formation	United States (Montana)	A member of Ankylosauridae belonging to the subfamily Ankylosaurinae. The type species is Z. crurivastator.	

== Birds ==
=== Research ===
- A study on the method allowing estimation of wing loading and aspect ratio in Mesozoic birds and on flight modes that were possible for Mesozoic birds is published by Serrano et al. (2017).
- A study on whether sternal keel length and ilium length were correlated in bird evolution, based on data from extant birds and Mesozoic birds, is published by Zhao, Liu and Li (2017).
- A study on the impact of varying oxygen concentrations, global temperatures and air densities on the flight performance of extinct birds and on major diversification events which took place during the evolution of birds is published by Serrano et al. (2017).
- A study on the pectoral girdle morphology of Mesozoic birds and its implications for the evolution of the avian flight musculature (specifically the supracoracoideus muscle) is published by Mayr (2017).
- A study on the morphological characteristics and evolution of the pygostyle and tail feathers in Early Cretaceous birds and closely related non-avian theropods is published by Wang & O'Connor (2017).
- A study on the postnatal skeletal development of limb bones in four species of extant aquatic birds (the streaked shearwater, the Japanese cormorant, the black-tailed gull and the rhinoceros auklet) and its implications for the assessment of ontogenetic stage of fossil and skeletal bird specimens is published by Watanabe (2017).
- A study estimating values of body weight, wing span and wing area of the trackmakers of the Cretaceous ichnotaxa Archaeornithipus meijidei, Hwangsanipes choughi and Yacoraitichnus avis is published by Tanaka (2017).
- The presence of the atlas rib in Archaeopteryx is reported for the first time by Tsuihiji (2017).
- A tooth attributed to an archaeopterygid bird is described from the Early Cretaceous of France by Louchart & Pouech (2017).
- A well-preserved skull of a juvenile specimen of Sapeornis chaoyangensis is described by Wang et al. (2017), preserving what the authors consider to be the complete dentition.
- A study on the flight capabilities of Sapeornis chaoyangensis is published by Serrano & Chiappe (2017).
- A study on the relationship between the oxygen isotope composition of bird bone phosphate and that of the drinking water of birds, as well as on implications of applying the discovered equation to Confuciusornis and to the Miocene and Pliocene penguins from Peru, is published by Amiot et al. (2017).
- A specimen of Confuciusornis sanctus with tendon- and cartilage-like tissues preserved around its ankle joint (with microstructure evident at the cellular level) is described by Jiang et al. (2017).
- A specimen of Eoconfuciusornis preserving soft-tissue traces of the ovary and wing is described by Zheng et al. (2017); the conclusions of this study are subsequently contested by Mayr et al. (2020), who interpret putative ovarian follicles of this specimen and other birds from the Jehol Biota as more likely to be ingested food items.
- A study on the taxonomic and morphological diversity of Early Cretaceous enantiornithines is published by Zelenkov (2017), who argues that members of the family Pengornithidae might be more closely related to Ornithuromorpha than to enantiornithines.
- A complete description of the skeletal anatomy of Chiappeavis magnapremaxillo, suggesting that rectricial bulbs were present in basal members of the enantiornithines, is published by O'Connor et al. (2017).
- A specimen of the enantiornithine Pterygornis dapingfangensis with a completely fused carpometacarpus and pelvis is described by Wang, Li & Zhou (2017), who also study the evolution of the manus and pelvis fusions in nonavian theropods, enantiornithines and ornithuromorphs.
- A bohaiornithid enantiornithine specimen with exceptionally preserved feathers, providing information on the colouration of the bird, is described from the Early Cretaceous Jiufotang Formation (China) by Peteya et al. (2017).
- Nearly half of a hatchling of an enantiornithine with preserved soft tissue is described from the Cretaceous Burmese amber by Xing et al. (2017).
- Description of the fossilized outer cones, rods, oil droplets and pigment epithelium preserved in an eye of an enantiornithine specimen from the Lower Cretaceous of China, and a study on their implications for inferring enantiornithine vision, is published by Tanaka et al. (2017).
- A new specimen of the Early Cretaceous species Archaeorhynchus spathula is described by Wang and Zhou (2017).
- An isolated tibiotarsus of a bird morphologically similar to Ichthyornis is described from the Late Cretaceous (Cenomanian) of Russia by Zelenkov, Averianov & Popov (2017).
- Description of new remains of hesperornithids from several Cretaceous (Campanian) localities of the Lower Volga Region (European Russia) and a revision of the systematics of Eurasian hesperornithiforms is published by Zelenkov, Panteleyev & Yarkov (2017).
- Delphine Angst et al. find Gargantuavis philoinos in Spain, in Laño.
- A study on the species richness, taxonomic diversity and presumed ecological characteristics of the Eocene avifauna of the Messel fossil site is published by Mayr (2017).
- Revision of bird fauna from the Miocene locality of Rudabànya (Hungary) is published by Zelenkov (2017).
- Worthy et al. (2017) provide an overview of the recent advances in avian palaeobiology in New Zealand.
- A review of the Neogene birds of continental Asia is provided by Zelenkov (2017).
- Passerine and anatid fossils are described from the Miocene Tsurevsky Formation (Krasnodar Krai, Russia) by Zelenkov (2017), representing the earliest known Miocene birds from European Russia reported so far.
- A study on the isolated contour feather from the Eocene Fur Formation (Denmark), indicating presence of melanosomes similar in size and morphology to those of extant parrots, is published by Gren et al. (2017).
- A study on the nuclear genome fragments recovered from extinct elephant birds and a reconstruction of the phylogenomic timetree for the group Palaeognathae is published by Yonezawa et al. (2017).
- Ancient DNA, including mitochondrial DNA and nuclear DNA, is recovered from elephant bird eggshell by Grealy et al. (2017).
- Results of palaeontological surveys of King and Flinders Islands (Australia) undertaken in 2014 and 2015, searching for remains of the King Island emu, are presented by Hume et al. (2017).
- A revision of ratite museum fossil specimens from Argentina, indicating presence of non-rheid ratites in South America during Paleogene and Miocene, is published by Agnolin (2017).
- A study on ancient DNA recovered from late Pleistocene ratite eggshell samples from India is published by Jain et al. (2017), providing the first molecular evidence for the presence of ostriches in India.
- A study on the phylogenetic relationships of fossil birds, focusing on resolving the relationships of giant flightless members of Galloanseres, is published by Worthy et al. (2017).
- A study on the phylogenetic relationships of Vegavis iaai, Polarornis gregorii and Australornis lovei is published by Agnolín et al. (2017), who name a new anseriform family Vegaviidae.
- New skeletal elements (limb bones) of Garganornis ballmanni are described from the Miocene of Italy by Pavia et al. (2017).
- A tarsometatarsus of a member of the anseriform genus Paranyroca is described from the late Oligocene/early Miocene of the Saint-Gérand-le-Puy area (France) by Mayr & Smith (2017), representing the first known record of the genus from the Old World.
- A study establishing criteria for assessing presence or absence of flight ability in fossil anatids, as well as assessing flight abilities of fossil anatids based on the constructed rules, is published by Watanabe (2017).
- Rawlence et al. (2017) interpret extinct New Zealand swan as a member of a distinct swan lineage divergent from modern black swan, based on ancient DNA and osteological data.
- The first Cenozoic avian body fossil from the Korean Peninsula (partial tibiotarsus of a member of the clade Galloanserae more closely related to galliforms than to anseriforms) is described from the Miocene Bukpyeong Formation (South Korea) by Park & Park (2017).
- Two parallel trackways produced by a guineafowl or a member of the family Phasianidae, rendered visible by the layer of biofilm, are described from the Pleistocene Waenhuiskrans Formation (South Africa) by Helm et al. (2017), representing the longest identified fossil avian trackways in the region.
- A revision of non-passeriform birds belonging to the group Neoaves known from the Miocene locality of Polgárdi (Hungary) is published by Zelenkov (2017).
- A study on the bone histology of the dodo (Raphus cucullatus) and its implications for the life history of members of this species is published by Angst et al. (2017).
- A study estimating the mass of the dodo is published by van Heteren et al. (2017).
- A study on the genetic diversity of the passenger pigeons based on the analysis of mitochondrial and nuclear genomes of members of the species is published by Murray et al. (2017).
- A study on lipid residues recovered from the uropygial gland of an early Eocene bird (possibly a messelirrisorid or a close relative of the family) from the Messel pit (Germany) is published by O'Reilly et al. (2017).
- A study on the diet and trophic position of the South Island adzebill (Aptornis defossor) as indicated by bone stable isotope data is published by Wood et al. (2017).
- Partial tibiotarsus of a member of Cariamae belonging or related to the family Ameghinornithidae is described from the Eocene strata in Inner Mongolia (China) correlative to the Irdin Manha Formation by Stidham & Wang (2017).
- A study on the morphological adaptations linked to substrate preference and locomotory mode in the hindlimbs of phorusrhacids is published by Degrange (2017).
- Limb elements of a single specimen of a middle-sized terror bird are described from the Miocene of northwestern Argentina by Vezzosi & Noriega (2017), who interpret this specimen as a member of the genus Mesembriornis belonging or related to the species M. milneedwardsi.
- Restudy of the holotype specimen of the putative Miocene seriema Noriegavis santacrucensis is published by Noriega & Mayr (2017), who reinterpret this specimen as a member of the falconid genus Thegornis of uncertain specific assignment.
- Fossils of at least eight species of Pleistocene passerines are described from the Liang Bua cave on the island of Flores (Indonesia) by Meijer et al. (2017).
- A study on the paleoecology of the late Pleistocene populations of the eastern bluebird (Sialia sialis) and the Hispaniolan crossbill (Loxia megaplaga) from the Bahamian island of Abaco is published by Steadman & Franklin (2017).
- Darter fossils are described from the late Pliocene Tatrot Formation (India) by Stidham et al. (2017).
- Incomplete skull of a bald ibis related to the southern bald ibis is described from the Bolt's Farm Cave System (Cradle of Humankind, Pliocene of South Africa) by Pavia et al. (2017).
- Leg bones of a penguin comparable in size to Anthropornis nordenskjoeldi are described from the mid-Paleocene Waipara Greensand (New Zealand) by Mayr, De Pietri & Scofield (2017).
- An incomplete left tarsometatarsus of a penguin from the Late Eocene La Meseta Formation of Seymour Island, Antarctica is described by Jadwiszczak & Mörs, (2017). they report on a recently collected large-sized tarsometatarsus from this formation that represents a new morphotype. They are convinced that the morphotype corresponds to a new species, but the material is too scarce for a taxonomic act.
- A new skull of a medium-sized penguin is described from the late Eocene Submeseta Formation of Seymour Island, Antarctica by Haidr & Acosta Hospitaleche (2017), who also study the differences in proportions between skull and postcranial skeletons of Eocene and modern penguins.
- Description of new penguin fossils from different levels of the Eocene La Meseta and Submeseta formations, including the most complete beak of a penguin from Antarctica, and a study on the dietary habits of these penguins as indicated by the morphology of the mandibles and maxillary remains, is published by Haidr & Acosta Hospitaleche (2017).
- A study on the locomotion of Brontornis and the phorusrhacids Paraphysornis and Kelenken, identifying them as adapted for slow walking rather than fast running locomotion, and evaluating possible ecology of these taxa, is published by Angst & Chinsamy (2017).
- A study on the fossil bird remains from the Pliocene locality of Kanapoi (Kenya), indicating presence of many aquatic birds, is published online by Field (2017).
- Description of Holocene bird remains from the archaeological site at Tula Village (Tutuila, American Samoa) is published by Tennyson, Rieth & Cochrane (2017).

=== New taxa ===
Name	Novelty	Status	Authors	Age	Unit	Location	Notes	Images
Aprosdokitos	Gen. et sp. nov	Valid	Hospitaleche, Reguero & Santillana	Eocene	La Meseta Formation Submeseta III	Antarctica (Seymour Island)	A penguin. The type species is A. mikrotero.	
Awengkere	Gen. et sp. nov	Valid	Worthy & Yates	Late Miocene	Waite Formation	Australia	A member of the family Anatidae. The type species is A. magnanatis.	
Bubo ibericus	Sp. nov	Valid	Meijer et al.	Early Pleistocene		Spain	A horned owl.	
Chupkaornis	Gen. et sp. nov	Valid	Tanaka et al.	Late Cretaceous (Coniacian to Santonian)	Kashima Formation	Japan	A member of Hesperornithiformes. The type species is C. keraorum.	
Colaptes naroskyi	Sp. nov	Valid	Agnolin et Jofré	Early-Late Pleistocene - Early-Mid Pleistocene	Jáuregui Member	Argentina Uruguay	A member of the Picidae.	
Crexica	Gen. et sp. nov	Valid	Zelenkov, Panteleyev & De Pietri	Late Miocene		Russia	A rail. Genus includes new species C. crexica.	
Cruralispennia	Gen. et sp. nov	Valid	Wang et al.	Early Cretaceous (130.7 Myr ago)	Huajiying Formation	China	A member of Enantiornithes. The type species is C. multidonta.	
Deliaphaps	Gen. et sp. nov	Valid	De Pietri et al.	Early Miocene	Bannockburn Formation	New Zealand	A member of the family Columbidae, likely related to the Nicobar pigeon, the tooth-billed pigeon, the western crowned pigeon, the dodo and the Rodrigues solitaire. The type species is D. zealandiensis.	
Diomedavus	Gen. et sp. nov	Valid	Mayr & Goedert	Late Oligocene	Lincoln Creek Formation	United States (Washington)	A stem-albatross. Genus includes new species D. knapptonensis.	
Eocliffia	Gen. et sp. nov	Valid	Mourer-Chauviré, Pickford & Senut	Eocene (Bartonian)	Eocliff Limestone	Namibia	A member of Charadriiformes of uncertain phylogenetic placement, related to buttonquails. The type species is E. primaeva.	
Garrdimalga	Gen. et sp. nov	Valid	Shute, Prideaux & Worthy	Pleistocene		Australia	A megapode. The type species is G. mcnamarai.	
Junornis	Gen. et sp. nov	Valid	Liu et al.	Early Cretaceous	Yixian Formation	China	A member of Enantiornithes. The type species is J. houi.	
Kumimanu	Gen. et sp. nov	Valid	Mayr et al.	Paleocene (late Teurian)	Moeraki Formation	New Zealand	An early penguin. The type species is K. biceae.	
Latagallina	Gen. et comb. et sp. nov	Valid	Shute, Prideaux & Worthy	Early to Late Pleistocene		Australia	A megapode. The type species is "Progura" naracoortensis van Tets (1974); genus also includes new species L. olsoni.	
Leucocarbo septentrionalis	Sp. nov	Valid	Rawlence et al.	Holocene		New Zealand	A blue-eyed shag.	
Maaqwi	Gen. et sp. nov	Valid	McLachlan, Kaiser & Longrich	Late Cretaceous (Campanian)	Northumberland Formation	Canada (British Columbia)	Probably a member of Vegaviidae. The type species is M. cascadensis.	
Macranhinga ameghinoi	Sp. nov	Valid	Diederle & Agnolin	Miocene (Colloncuran)		Argentina	A darter.	
Microenantiornis	Gen. et sp. nov	Valid	Wei & Li	Early Cretaceous	Jiufotang Formation	China	A member of Enantiornithes. The type species is M. vulgaris.	
Miocariama	Gen. et sp. nov	Valid	Noriega & Mayr	Early Miocene	Santa Cruz Formation	Argentina	A seriema. The type species is M. patagonica.	
Miohypotaenidia	Gen. et sp. nov	Valid	Zelenkov, Panteleyev & De Pietri	Late Miocene		Russia	A rail. Genus includes new species M. tanaisensis.	
Opisthodactylus kirchneri	Sp. nov	Valid	Noriega et al.	Late Miocene	Andalhuala Formation	Argentina	A member of the family Rheidae.	
Pampagyps	Gen. et sp. nov	Valid	Agnolin et al.	Lujanian		Argentina	A New World vulture. The type species is P. imperator.	
Piscivorenantiornis	Gen. et sp. nov	Valid	Wang & Zhou	Early Cretaceous	Jiufotang Formation	China	A member of Enantiornithes. The type species is P. inusitatus.	
Progura campestris	Sp. nov	Valid	Shute, Prideaux & Worthy	Pleistocene		Australia	A megapode.	
Pyrrhula crassa	Sp. nov	Valid	Rando et al.	Holocene		Azores	A bullfinch.	
Sylvosimadaravis	Gen. et comb. nov	Valid	Zelenkov	Late Miocene		Hungary	Type species is "Certhia" janossyi Kessler et Hír, 2012 and it is placed in the superfamily Sylvioidea.	
Tsidiiyazhi	Gen. et sp. nov	Valid	Ksepka, Stidham & Williamson	Early Paleocene	Nacimiento Formation	United States (New Mexico)	A stem-mousebird belonging to the family Sandcoleidae. The type species is T. abini.	
Vanolimicola	Gen. et sp. nov	Valid	Mayr	Early Eocene	Messel pit	Germany	A bird of uncertain phylogenetic placement with a shorebird-like beak. The type species is V. longihallucis.	

== Pterosaurs ==
=== Research ===
- A study on the body size evolution in pterosaurs, especially on whether Bergmann's rule can be shown to apply to pterosaurs, is published by Villalobos et al. (2017).
- A study on the occurrence of competition and ecological separation between pterosaurs and birds as indicated by analyses of functionally equivalent morphological characters of lower jaw, fore- and hindlimbs is published by Chan (2017).
- A study on the differences between soft-tissue structure and attachments articulating skeletal joints of Rhamphorhynchus and Pterodactylus as indicated by known skeletons of members of both taxa is published by Beardmore, Lawlor & Hone (2017).
- Pterosaur manus tracks are described from the Late Cretaceous of Morocco by Masrour et al. (2017).
- A study on the systematic relationships of Parapsicephalus purdoni is published by O'Sullivan & Martill (2017).
- A study on the differences in the anatomy of the skull crests in wukongopterid pterosaur specimens and its implications for the function of these crests is published by Cheng et al. (2017).
- New specimen of Kunpengopterus sinensis, providing new information on the anatomy of members of the species, is described from the Upper Jurassic Tiaojishan Formation (China) by Cheng et al. (2017).
- An accumulation of hundreds of eggs (some of which contain embryonic remains) of Hamipterus tianshanensis is reported from the Lower Cretaceous of China by Wang et al. (2017), who interpret the finding as evidence of colonial nesting and potential nesting site fidelity in pterosaurs, and argue that the hatchlings might have been flightless and not as precocial as previously thought.
- Isolated teeth belonging to indeterminate members of the clade Anhangueria are described from the Early Cretaceous (Albian) Griman Creek Formation (Australia) by Brougham, Smith & Bell (2017).
- A study on the morphological diversity of the skulls of anhanguerids from the Lower Cretaceous Romualdo Formation (Brazil) and its implications for the taxonomy of members of the genus Anhanguera is published by Pinheiro & Rodrigues (2017).
- A redescription of the holotype specimen of Dawndraco kanzai is published by Martin-Silverstone et al. (2017), who consider this species to be a junior synonym of Pteranodon sternbergi.
- A redescription of the holotype specimen of Jidapterus edentus and a study on the taxonomic validity, phylogenetic relationships and paleoecology of the species is published by Wu, Zhou & Andres (2017).
- Funston, Martin-Silverstone & Currie (2017) describe a fossil specimen from the Upper Cretaceous (Campanian) Dinosaur Park Formation (Canada), interpreted as a partial pterosaur pelvis (tentatively referred to Azhdarchidae), which if confirmed would represent the first described pelvic material from a North American azhdarchid; however, this specimen is subsequently reinterpreted as a broken tyrannosaurid squamosal.
- A description of a neck vertebra of a probable member of the genus Hatzegopteryx recovered from the Late Cretaceous (Maastrichtian) Sebeş Formation (Romania) and a study on the implications of the vertebra's anatomy for the neck length and ecology of Hatzegopteryx is published by Naish & Witton (2017).
- Fragments of neck vertebra of a gigantic pterosaur are described from the Upper Cretaceous Nemegt Formation (Mongolia) by Tsuihiji et al. (2017).
- Leal et al. (2017) describe a chaoyangopterid pterosaur based on remains found in the Crato Formation (Brazil), providing further support for the presence of these types of pterosaurs in the Early Cretaceous of Brazil. The phylogenetic position of Lacusovagus is also reviewed in this study.

=== New taxa ===
Name	Novelty	Status	Authors	Age	Unit	Location	Notes	Images
Altmuehlopterus	Gen. et comb. nov	Valid	Vidovic & Martill	Late Jurassic	Mörnsheim Limestone Formation	Germany	A pterodactyloid pterosaur; a new genus for "Germanodactylus" rhamphastinus (Wagner, 1851).	
Argentinadraco	Gen. et sp. nov	Valid	Kellner & Calvo	Late Cretaceous (Turonian-Coniacian)	Portezuelo Formation	Argentina	A member of Azhdarchoidea, possibly an azhdarchid. The type species is A. barrealensis.	
Douzhanopterus	Gen. et sp. nov	Valid	Wang et al.	Late Jurassic	Tiaojishan Formation	China	A non-pterodactyloid monofenestratan. The type species is D. zhengi.	
Liaodactylus	Gen. et sp. nov	Valid	Zhou et al.	Late Jurassic (Oxfordian)	Tiaojishan Formation	China	A member of Ctenochasmatidae. The type species is L. primus.	
Serradraco	Gen. et comb. nov	Valid	Rigal, Martill & Sweetman	Early Cretaceous (late Valanginian or early Hauterivian)	Upper Tunbridge Wells Sand Formation	United Kingdom	A pterodactyloid pterosaur; a new genus for "Pterodactylus" sagittirostris Owen (1874). Announced in 2017; the final version of the article naming it was published in 2018.	
Vesperopterylus	Gen. et sp. nov	Valid	Lü et al.	Early Cretaceous	Jiufotang Formation	China	A member of the family Anurognathidae. Genus includes new species V. lamadongensis. Announced in 2017; the final version of the article naming it was published in 2018.	
Xericeps	Gen. et sp. nov	Valid	Martill et al.	Cretaceous (Albian or early Cenomanian)	Kem Kem Beds	Morocco	A member of Azhdarchoidea. The type species is X. curvirostris. Announced in 2017; the final version of the article naming it was published in 2018.	

== Other archosaurs ==
=== Research ===
- A study on the morphological differences between the femora of Dromomeron romeri and Tawa hallae is published by Müller (2017), who rejects the hypothesis that the two species are synonymous.

=== New taxa ===
Name	Novelty	Status	Authors	Age	Unit	Location	Notes	Images
Teleocrater	Gen. et sp. nov	Valid	Nesbitt et al.	Middle Triassic	Manda Beds	Tanzania	An early member of Avemetatarsalia belonging to the newly named group Aphanosauria. The type species is T. rhadinus.	
