= Bird ichnology =

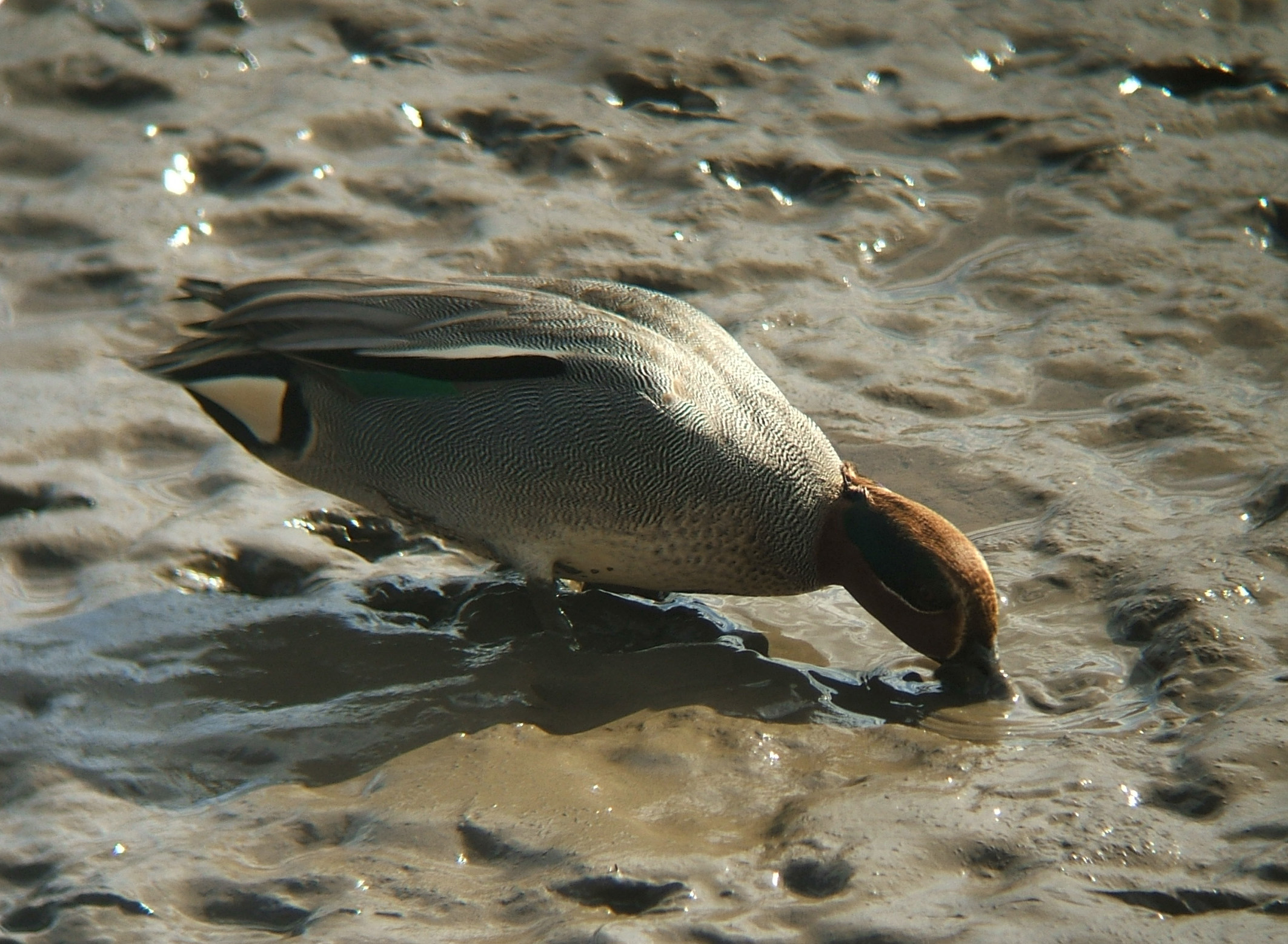
Male common teal producing feeding traces on a River Tyne mudflat.

Bird ichnology is the study of avian life traces in ornithology and paleontology. Such life traces can include footprints, nests, feces and coproliths. Scientists gain insight about the behavior and diversity of birds by studying such evidence.

Ichnofossils (or ichnites) are especially important for clarifying the evolution and prehistoric diversity of taxa. These cannot usually be associated with a particular genus, let alone species of bird, as hardly ever they are associated with fossil bones. But it is possible to group them into ichnotaxa based on their morphology (form). In practice, the details of shape that reveal the birds' behavior or biologic affinity are generally given more weight in ichnologic classification.

== Bird ichnofossils ==
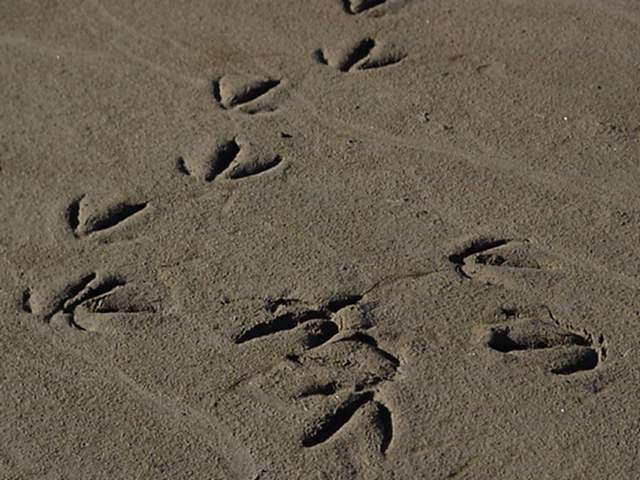
Bird footprints typically have a wider angle between the toes. These goose tracks show that webs do not necessarily leave an impression.

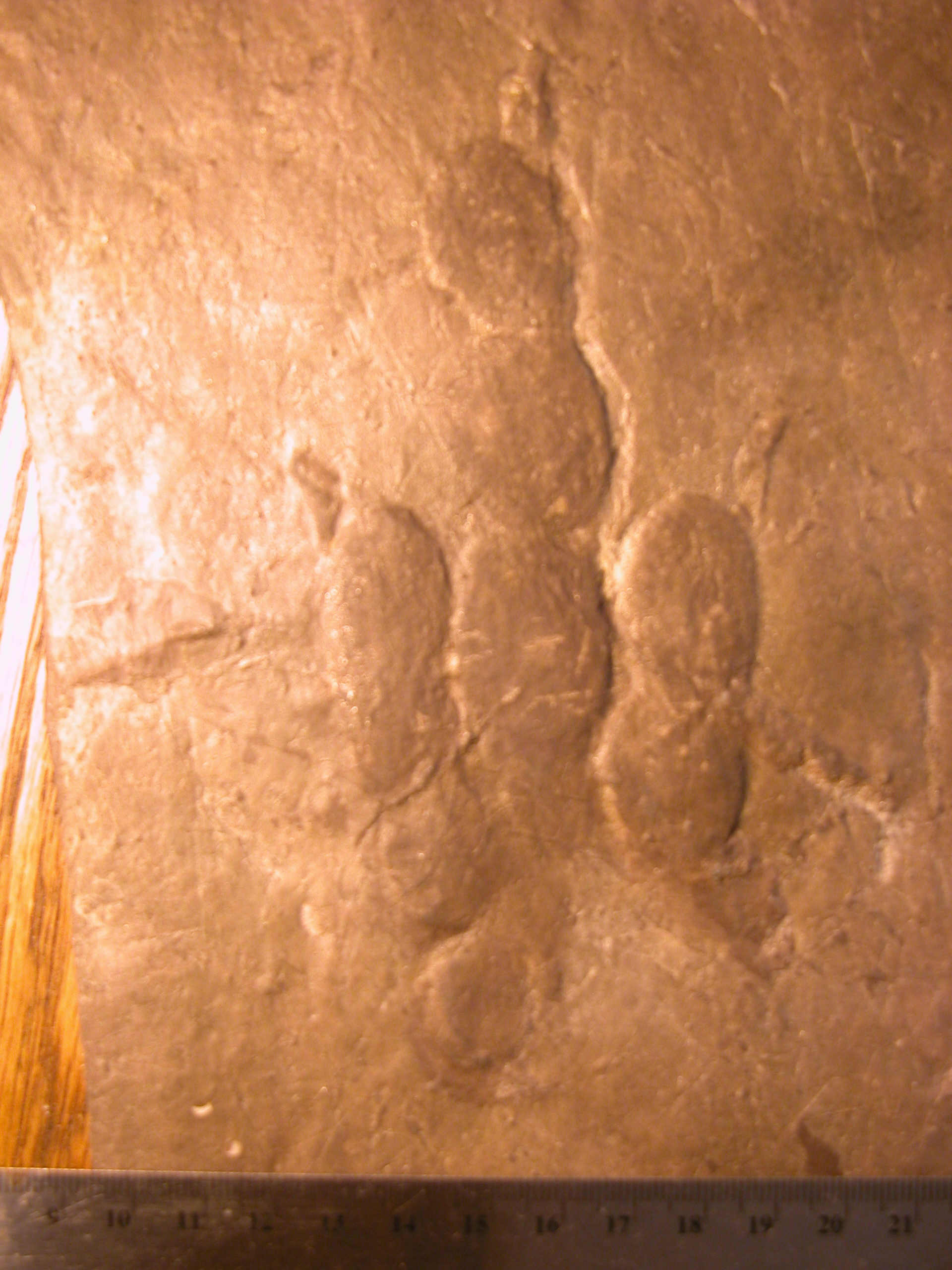
Grallator are the footprints of a Coelophysis-like theropod, initially mistaken for those of a ratite bird.

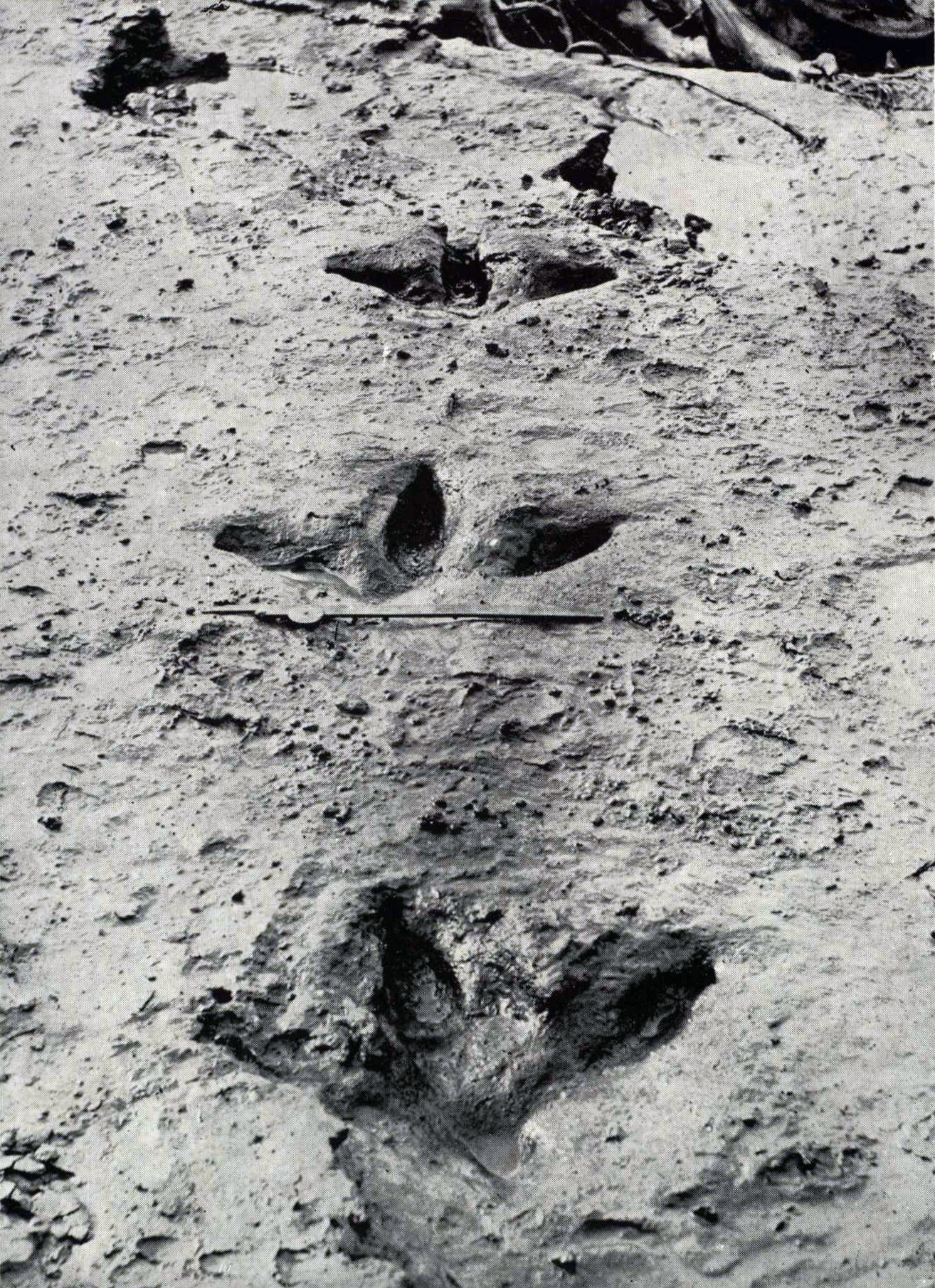
Footprints of a large moa found in 1911

These fossil traces of birds are sometimes hard to interpret correctly, especially when they are from the Mesozoic when the birds' dinosaurian relatives were still in existence. Nests at least of Neornithes are usually quite easy to identify as such due to the unique structures of their eggshells; there is some uncertainty as regards the origin of certain Mesozoic eggshells, which makes nests of this age problematic.

Mesozoic fossil footprints are hardest to attribute. "Proto-bird" and related theropod feet were very much alike; non-avian theropod tracks such as the ichnogenus Grallator were initially attributed to ratites because in the early 19th century when these were described, the knowledge about dinosaurian diversity was marginal compared to today, whereas ratites were well known. Also, under the creationist dogma, scientists would believe that e.g. rheas had been around for all eternity. In the Jurassic and Early Cretaceous, juvenile non-avian theropods left very birdlike footprints. Towards the end of the Cretaceous, the tracks of aquatic birds are usually recognizable due to the presence of webbing between the toes; indeed, most avian ichnotaxa fall into this group. However, giant flightless birds also existed by that time, as evidenced by Gargantuavis; if the Gastornithidae were indeed close to Anseriformes, their lineage must also have been distinct by then. Such footprints may resemble those of non-avian theropod or even ornithopod dinosaurs. Among the former, the Ornithomimiformes (= "Arctometatarsalia" sensu stricto) were convergent to ratites in many respects, including the feet, and it is impossible to tell if some large bird-like footprints from the Late Cretaceous are from an ornithomimiform or a giant bird, without associated bone material.

== Footprints ==
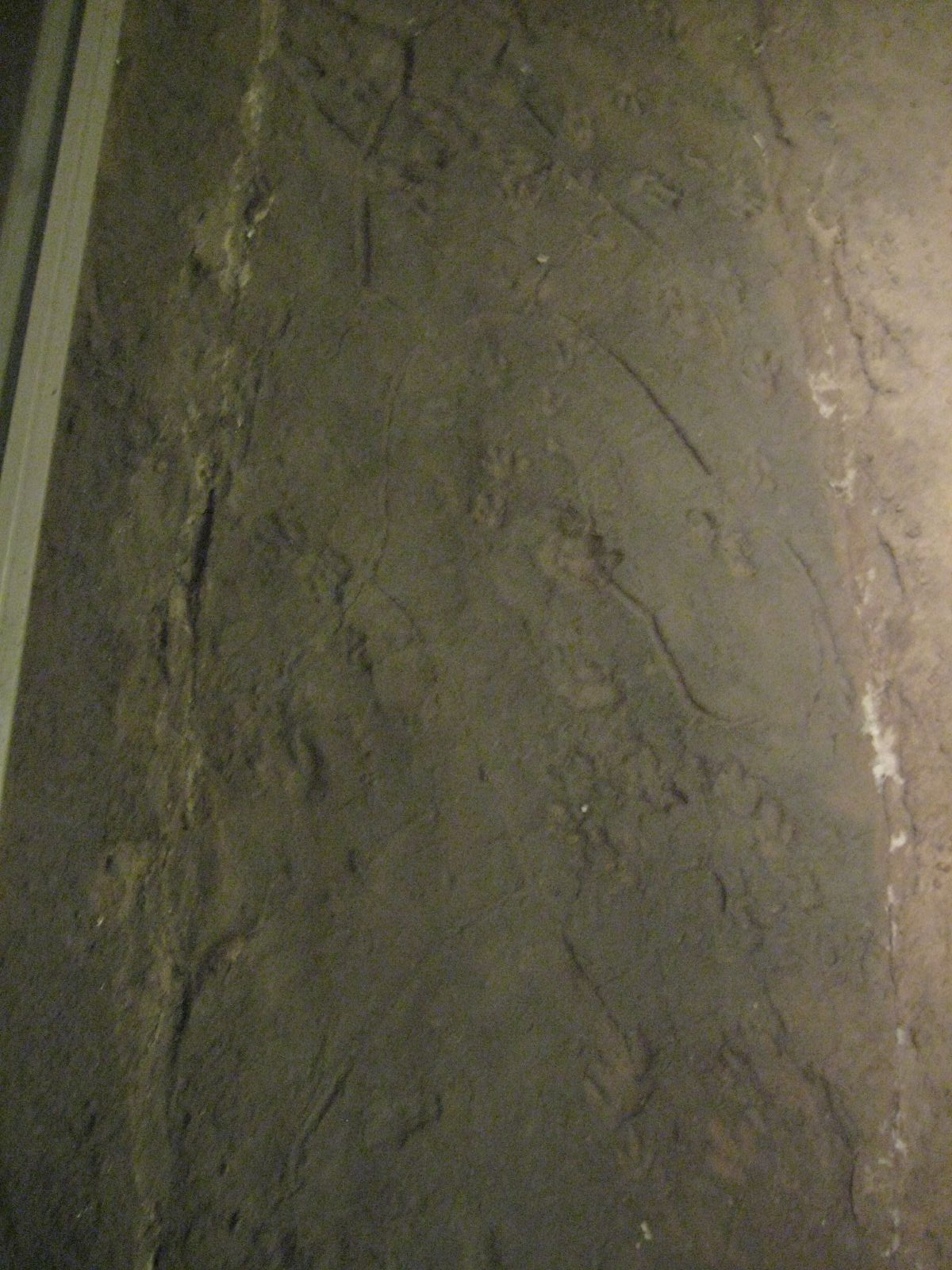
48-million-year-old bird and mammal footprints from the Early Eocene Green River Formation

There exist documented tracks that appear avian since the Late Triassic, by some 55 million years predating the first proper evidence that very birdlike theropods were present. The Late Triassic and early-mid Jurassic tracks have been assigned to the ichnogenera Trisauropodiscus and Aquatilavipes. Few scientists would go as far though to consider these traces evidence that birds evolved much earlier than generally believed, and perhaps not from theropod dinosaurs as per today's mainstream opinion. In fact, it seems that the initial dating of these very ancient bird-like tracks was in error, and they seem to date from a much later time when modern birds were already known from bone fossils.

Footprints of at least Neornithes can be distinguished by several features:

- if a hallux is present, it is directed straight backwards or nearly so.
- the second to fourth (front) toes have a wide angle between them (generally 90–180° or so)
- due to Neornithes having a completely fused tarsometatarsus (the "lower leg", actually the ankle and midfoot bones) they have no heel pads (except large terrestrial birds)

It is notable that Heterodontosauridae are known from the localities and times when the first avian-looking footprints started to appear. These small ornithopod dinosaurs were entirely unbirdlike, except for their ornithischian pelvis and a tarsometatarsus strongly convergent to that of Enantiornithes. Though some details remain unresolved, it is far more plausible that Trisauropodiscus etc. were made by a Heterodontosaurus-like animal rather than some sort of bird.

- †Trisauropodiscus (Early Jurassic? of Stormberg, South Africa)

Avian? Non-avian theropod (juvenile Grallator)? Heterodontosaurid?

- †Archaeornithipus (Late Jurassic/Early Cretaceous of Soria, Spain)

No hallux; Avian?

- †Aquatilavipes (Early Cretaceous of Canada, E Asia ?and South Dakota, USA -? Anacleto Late Cretaceous of Sierra Barrosa, Argentina)

5–6 × 4–5 cm (h/v). Toes long, narrow, small webs; no or very small hallux; T2-T4 100–140°; toe pads; step 20 cm. Avian: Patagopteryx? shorebird?

- †Fuscinapedis (Woodbine Early Cretaceous of Denton County, Texas)

35 × 35 cm (h/v). Toes long, wide; no hallux; T2-T4 110°; toe pads; step 208cm. Avian: giant flightless bird?

- †Goseongornipes (Jindong Early? Cretaceous of Goseong County, South Korea) – Geongsangornipes is lapsus

4-4.5 × 3-3.5 cm (h/v w/o hallux). Toes long, thin, T3-T4 small webs, T2 shorter; hallux backwards and high; T1-T4 220°; T2-T4 140–150°. Avian: shorebird

- †Jindongornipes (Jindong Early? Cretaceous of Goseong County, South Korea)

6.5–7.5 × 5–6 cm (h/v w/o hallux). Toes long, thin, unwebbed, T2 shorter; hallux backwards, high; T1-T4 225°; T2-T4 95–160°; toe pads. Avian: shorebird

- †Koreanaornis (Early Cretaceous of Korea)

2.5–3.5 × 2.5-3 cm (h/v w/o hallux). Toes long, thin, unwebbed; hallux backwards, high, very small; T1-T4 180; T2-T4 90–135°; toe pads. Avian: shorebird

- †Ichnogen. indet. (Jindong Early? Cretaceous of Goseong County, South Korea)

2.3 × 3.5 cm (h/v). Toes narrow, unwebbed, T2+T4 shorter; no hallux; T2-T4 75–80°. Avian? perching bird?

- †Magnoavipes (Early/Middle Cretaceous of Texas, ?and Israel -? Late Cretaceous of Korea)

25 × 20 cm (h/v). Toes long, very thin; no hallux; T2-T4 109–118°; step 200-217cm. Avian?

- †Pullornipes (Early Cretaceous of China)

3.3–5.1 × 3.3–4.7 cm (h/v w/o hallux). Toes long, narrow, unwebbed; hallux small, high, backwards and inwards; T1-T4 270–320°, T2-T4 88–141°; step c.15 cm. Avian: shorebird?

- †Shandongornipes (Tianjialou Early Cretaceous of Junan County, China)

6 × 9 cm (h/v). Toes long, thin, unwebbed; hallux backwards, some zygodactyl; T1-T4 220°; T2-T4 135°; toe pads. Avian: cursorial bird

- †Uhangrichnus (Haman Early – Uhrangi Late Cretaceous of SW Korea)

c.4 × 3.7 cm (h/v). Toes long, narrow, fully webbed; no hallux; T2-4 c.100°. Avian: waterbird

- †Barrosopus (Anacleto Late Cretaceous of Sierra Barrosa, Argentina)

3.5 × 3 cm (h/v). Toes narrow, unwebbed, T2 separated (higher); no hallux; T2-T4 100–120°; step 20 cm. Avian?

- †Sarjeantopodus (Lance Late Cretaceous of Niobrara County, USA)

c.9 × 9 cm (h/v). Toes long, thin; hallux backwards; T1-T4 c.215°; T2-T4 c.150°; Toes webbed, no distinct toe pads. Avian: shorebird

- †Saurexallopus (Late Cretaceous of WC USA)

30 × 25–30 cm (h/v). Toes long, thin; hallux sideways; T1-T4 130–170°; T2-T4 90°; deep heel; toe pads. Avian?

- †Yacoraitichnus (Late Cretaceous of Quebrada del Tapón, Argentina) – Yacoriteichnus is lapsus

No hallux. Avian: enantiornithine? neornithine (galliform)?

- †"Patagonichnornis" (Cretaceous of Ingeniero Jacobacci, Argentina) – nomen nudum

Avian: shorebird?

- †Iranipeda (Pliocene of Iran) – may be same as Gruipeda
- †Presbyorniformipes (Green River Early Eocene of Utah, USA)

Web impressions present; Avian: presbyornithine?

- †Charadriipeda (Late Eocene of France, Spain and USA – Miocene or Romania) – including Ludicharadripodiscus

Web impressions may be present; Avian: anseriform? charadriiform?

- †Leptoptilostipus (Liedena Sandstone Late Eocene of S Pyrenees, Spain)

c.10 × 9 cm (h/v). Toes long, thin, may be partially webbed; hallux small, backwards; T1-T4 190°; T2-T4 130°. Avian: large stork-like wading bird or basal waterfowl.

- †Ornithoformipes (Puget Group Late Eocene of Kummer, USA)

c.27 × 32 cm (h/v). Toes long, wide; no hallux; T2-T4 65°; deep heel; toe pads. May be from Gastornis; validity disputed.

- †Reyesichnus (Middle Miocene of Salar del Hombre Muerto, Argentina)

Avian: shorebird?

- †Avipeda (Copper Canyon Late Miocene of California, USA)

Web impressions sometimes present; Avian: waterbirds (Anseriformes, Charadriiformes, Ciconiiformes, Rallidae?)

- †Roepichnus (Caños Late Miocene of Almería, Spain)

Web impressions present; Avian

- †Anatipeda (Miocene of Romania)

Web impressions present; Avian: anseriform?

- †Gruipeda

Ichnofamily Ignotornidae

- †Ignotornis (Haman Early Cretaceous of Korea – Dakota Sandstone Late Cretaceous of Colorado, USA, ?and Argentina)

6 × 5 cm (h/v w/o hallux). Toes long, narrow, unwebbed or partial small webs, T2 smaller; hallux backwards and high; T1-T4 220°, T2-T4 130–145°; toe pads; step 33 cm. Avian: Neuquenornis? shorebird?

- †Hwangsanipes (Uhangri Late Cretaceous of South Korea)

x. 7 × 6 cm (h/v w/o hallux). Toes long, narrow, T2+3 partially, T3+4 fully webbed; hallux large; 1–4 c.225°; T2-4 c.110°. Avian: shorebird

== Egg fossils (ootaxa) ==
Fossil eggshells are not actually ichnofossils. As they preserve direct evidence of an organism's physiology, their shape, size and the structure of the eggshell give more robust clues to their origin than do footprints. Typically, fossil eggs can be quite unequivocally assigned to a specific group of organisms, e.g. chelonians, squamates, dinosaurs, crocodiles, pterosaurs or (modern) birds.

Still, egg fossils rarely are identifiable even to family, let alone to species. Thus, they are assigned to ootaxa, which are much like ichnotaxa but form a distinct group (Veterovata) in parataxonomy. For the time being however, ootaxa assigned to prehistoric birds at least tentatively are listed here:

- † Oolithus (Late Jurassic of England) – avian?
- † Dispersituberoolithus (Oldman Late Cretaceous of S Alberta, Canada) – neornithine?
- † Gobioolithus (Late Cretaceous) – paleognath?
- † Subtiliolithus (Late Cretaceous of Mongolia)
- † Tristraguloolithus (Oldman Late Cretaceous of S Alberta, Canada) – galliform (cracid)?
- † Ornitholithus (Late Paleocene of Spain – Early Eocene of France) – presumably from Gastornis
- † Incognitoolithus (Eocene of North America) – ratite?
- † Type A ("aepyornithoid") eggs (Tsondab Early Miocene of Namibia – Pliocene of Asia) – ratite?
- † Namornis (Middle Miocene of Namibia – Late Miocene of Kenya) – ratite?
- † Diamantornis (Middle Miocene of Namibia – Late Miocene of UAE and Kenya) – ratite?
- † Mediolithus (Eocene of Germany)
- † Psammornis – may be from Eremopezus or Struthio
- Extant genera with named oospecies
  - Struthio – includes Struthiolithus

== See also ==
- Fossil birds
- Feathered dinosaurs
- Origin of birds
- Veterovata
