= Mycomorphoolithus =

Mycomorphoolithus Temporal range: Berriasian-Cenomanian

Egg fossil classification
- Basic shell type: †Crocodiloid
- Oogenus: †Mycomorphoolithus; Moreno-Azanza et al., 2015

Oospecies
- †M. kohringi Moreno-Azanza et al., 2015 (type)

Mycomorphoolithus (meaning "fungus-shaped stone egg") is an oogenus of fossil eggs found in Spain, England, and Utah. They possibly represent eggshells of non-eusuchian crocodylomorphs, and are similar to, but not part of, the Krokolithidae.

== Distribution ==
M. kohringi is known from three formations in the Maestrazgo Basin in Spain: the El Castellar Formation, the Mirambel Formation, and the Blesa Formation, plus La Huergina and El Collado Formations in Spain, all of which are Barremian age. Also, eggshell fragments referred to Mycomorphoolithus sp. are known from the Purbeck Group in England, which is dated to the Berriasian. Fossils referrable to Mycomorphoolithus kohringi were also discovered at the Cedar Mountain Formation in Utah, which date to the Cenomanian; much more recently than the other known specimens.

== History ==
Mycomorphoolithus were first discovered (though not yet named) in 1990 by German paleontologist Rolph Köhring, who believed them to be the eggs of batagurine turtles. In 2015, the oogenus and oospecies Mycomorphoolithus kohringi was named by Moreno-Azanza et al. in honor of Köhring, based on the discovery of several fossil eggshell fragments in the Maestrazgo Basin of Spain.

From their discovery in 1990 until the description of the oospecies in 2015, paleontologists have conjectured many possible identities for the parent of Mycomorphoolithus eggs. Köhring originally conjectured that they were the eggs of batagurine turtles, but later he believed them to be dinosaurian. Eggshell fragments discovered in England were described by Ensom in 2002, which are now referred to Mycomorphoolithus sp., were classified in the dinosauroid-spherulitic morphotype, and tentatively assigned to Faveoloolithidae (probably the eggs of sauropods). However, the 2015 description by Moreno-Azanza et al. shows that they are neither turtle nor dinosaur eggs, and suggests they were laid by a non-eusuchian crocodylomorph.

The first discovery of Mycomorphoolithus outside of Europe was reported in 2025, namely two eggshell fragments collected in Utah between 2012 and 2022 and housed in the North Carolina Museum of Natural Sciences. While much younger than the other known Mycomorphoolithus specimens, and having a thicker shell, they are otherwise like the other known specimens and therefore not representative of a new oospecies.

== Description ==
Mycomorphoolithus is most notable for the mushroom-like shape of its eggshell units: They are very thin at the base, but suddenly increase dramatically in width about halfway through the eggshell. The eggshell of the European specimens is on average 524 micrometers thick, while the North American specimens are thicker, averaging 675 micrometers. The pores have highly variable shape and size, and are densely distributed across the eggshell, ranging from 4 to 10 pores per square millimeter.

Similar to krokolithids, and unlike dinosaur eggs, Mycomorphoolithus's eggshell units are isolated, have a blocky extinction pattern, and lack organic cores. It furthermore shares a single layered eggshell with Bauruoolithus, an oogenus of South American krokolithid. However, Krokolithes and modern crocodylians have multi-layered eggshells and a different ultrastructure from Mycomorphoolithus.

== Classification ==
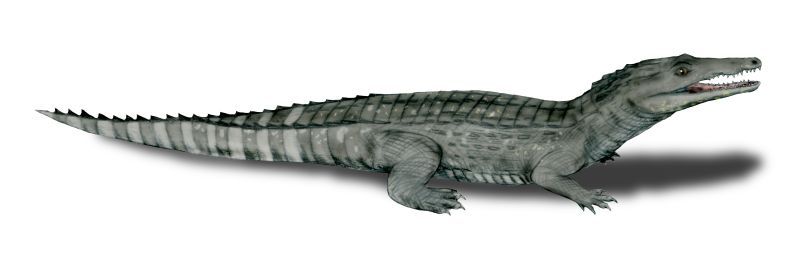
Bernissartia, a non-eusuchian crocodylomorph that could be the parent of Mycomorphoolithus eggs.

Due to their unique microstructure, classifying Mycomorphoolithus has been difficult. It has many similarities to the oofamily Krokolithidae, but the differences are significant enough to warrant its exclusion from that oofamily, as a closely related ootaxon. Because of its resemblance to krokolithids and to modern crocodylian eggs, as well as the presence of non-eusuchian crocodilomorphs at the same sites as Mycomorphoolithus, it is conjectured to be the fossil eggs laid by a non-eusuchian crocodylomorph. This still leaves many possible candidates; crocodylomorphs found in the same localities as Mycomorphoolithus represent Bernissartiidae, Atoposauridae, Goniopholididae, Pholidosauridae, and others.
