= Triunfosaurus =

Triunfosaurus Temporal range: Berriasian-Valanginian ~145.5–130 Ma

Scientific classification
- Kingdom: Animalia
- Phylum: Chordata
- Class: Reptilia
- Clade: Dinosauria
- Clade: Saurischia
- Clade: †Sauropodomorpha
- Clade: †Sauropoda
- Clade: †Macronaria
- Genus: †Triunfosaurus; Carvalho et al., 2017
- Species: †T. leonardii

Binomial name
- †Triunfosaurus leonardii Carvalho et al., 2017

Extinct genus of dinosaurs

Triunfosaurus (meaning "Triunfo Basin reptile") is a genus of somphospondylan sauropod dinosaur from the Early Cretaceous of Brazil. It contains a single species, T. leonardii, described by Carvalho et al. in 2017. As a genus, Triunfosaurus can be distinguished from all other titanosaurs by the unique proportions of its ischium. It was initially described as a basal titanosaur, making it the earliest basal titanosaur known; however, subsequent research questioned the identification of the taxon as a titanosaur, instead reassigning it to the Somphospondyli.

== Description ==
Triunfosaurus can be distinguished from other titanosaurs by two autapomorphies, or unique traits that distinguish it from other titanosaurs. Namely, the part of the ischium touching the pubis is half the height of the entire ischium, and the shaft of the ischium makes an angle of less than 70° with the acetabular portion, which contributes to the hip socket. It also presents a unique combination of vertebral characters not seen otherwise among titanosaurs, which are described below.

The vertebrae from near the front of the tail have short and robust processes, or prezygapophyses, on their front edges; these processes are also slightly angled upwards from the horizontal. At the top of the vertebrae, the neural spines are small and bear processes along their midlines that are expanded near the top. On the side of the vertebrae, the transverse processes are placed near the back of the bones, and are also slightly angled upward. The back half of the sides of the centra are strongly concave, while the depressions on the sides of the vertebrae known as pleurocoels are rather small. The internal textures of the centra are not sponge-like, or camellate.

In the haemal arches from the bottoms of vertebrae near the front of the tail, the holes that they form with the centra - the haemal canals - are narrow, and the arches themselves are relatively straight. The bottom ends of the arches are rounded and expanded, and the arches connect to the centra with simple facet joints at the tops of the bones. Near the middle of the tail, the haemal canals are smaller in height but proportionally wider, and the haemal arches overall become very flattened, including the bottom ends. The arches also are slightly concave, and the joints with the centra are situated closer to the back end. At the base of the arch on the back side, two small crests form a ridge-like structure.

== Discovery and naming ==
The holotype of Triunfosaurus, UFRJ-DG 498, was found in a sandstone layer of the Rio Piranhas Formation to the west of Paraíba State, Brazil. It consists of a partial skeleton including a series of three middle tail vertebrae (subsequently considered to be vertebrae from the front of the tail), three isolated chevrons, three isolated neural spines, and a right ischium. The fossils are part of the collection of the Universidade Federal do Rio de Janeiro. Based on correlation using pollen and co-occurrence of similar trackways, the Rio Piranhas Formation has been considered as a contemporary of the Sousa Formation, which extends from the Berriasian to the Valanginian, and possibly into the Hauterivian (correlating to the Rio da Serra and early Aratu faunal stages). Study of pollen found in the Rio Piranhas itself supports a Berriasian-Valanginian age, although the presence of Hauterivian deposits cannot be ruled out.

The type and only species Triunfosaurus leonardii was named and described in 2017 by Ismar de Souza Carvalho, Leonardo Salgado, Rafael Matos Lindoso, Hermínio Ismael de Araújo-Júnior, Francisco Cézar Costa Nogueira and José Agnelo Soares. The generic name refers to the Triunfo Basin in Paraíba, while the specific name honours the paleontologist Giuseppe Leonardi.

== Classification ==
=== Initial titanosaurian identification ===
In 2017, Triunfosaurus was placed in the clade Titanosauria as defined by Wilson and Upchurch in 2003, which is supported by the articulations of its haemal arches having two distinct surfaces as in other titanosaurs. Initially, Triunfosaurus was found to be in a rather basal polytomy along with Mendozasaurus; this basal position is supported by the tail vertebrae having flattened back ends, instead of being convex in the procoelous configuration of derived lithostrotian titanosaurs. Additionally, the short shaft of the ischium - and indeed the proportions of the bone in general - are quite similar to that of the similarly basal Andesaurus. However, the straight vertical neural spines warrant a more derived position than either Andesaurus or Mendozasaurus, while the relative shortness of the haemal canal relative to the rest of the haemal arch distinguishes Triunfosaurus from Andesaurus and other titanosaurs. The topology recovered, based on the dataset of Carballido & Sander, is reproduced below.

- Titanosauria
  - Andesaurus delgadoi
  - - Mendozasaurus neguyelap
    - - Malawisaurus dixleyi
      - Epachthosaurus sciuttoi
      - Argentinosaurus huinculensis
      - Malarguesaurus florenciae
      - Triunfosaurus leonardii
      - - - Nemegtosaurus mongoliensis
          - - Rapetosaurus krausei
            - - Tapuiasaurus macedoi
              - Isisaurus colberti
        - - Trigonosaurus pricei
          - - Alamosaurus sanjuanensis
            - - Opisthocoelicaudia skarzynskii
              - Saltasauridae
                - Saltasaurus loricatus
                - Neuquensaurus australis

This topology is poorly supported, since forcing Triunfosaurus to nest outside of the Titanosauria would require only two additional evolutionary steps, and the support values obtained for the clades are also low. As the oldest basal titanosaurian found to date, Triunfosaurus was initially used to support the hypothesis that the wider group originated on the supercontinent Gondwana around the Hauterivian, more specifically within South America. Nevertheless, an alternate hypothesis involving dispersal out of Europe remains plausible.

=== Reassignment as an indeterminate somphospondylan ===
In a subsequent redescription of the somphospondylan Austrosaurus, Steven Poropat and colleagues raised a number of objections to the titanosaurian status of Triunfosaurus. Poropat et al. noted that the furrow separating the arch into two surfaces, used by Carvalho et al. to assign Triunfosaurus to the Titanosauria, is likewise present in the non-titanosaur somphospondylans Phuwiangosaurus and Tangvayosaurus. They remarked that the short haemal canal directly contradicts the Titanosauria as defined by Wilson in 2002, although this feature is somewhat variable.

Additionally, the assignment of the caudal vertebrae to the middle of the tail was also questioned by Poropat et al.. Features in these vertebrae that are unusual for middle caudal vertebrae include the prominent transverse processes bearing deep diapophyses (articulations with the ribs), the pronounced prezygodiapophyseal laminae connecting the prezygapophyses and transverse processes, the well-developed spinoprezygapophyseal laminae connecting the prezygapophyses and neural spines, the deep indentations on the outer margins of the bottom of the centra, and the postzygapophyseal facet joints extending backwards from the midpoint of the side of the centra. The size of the transverse processes suggests that the vertebrae actually originate from the front of the tail, making their association with the ischium questionable due to their overall small size. For these reasons, Poropat et al. reassigned Triunfosaurus to the Somphospondyli, being unable to confidently support its titanosaurian affinities due to its problematic nature.

== Paleoecology ==
Vertebrate fossils from the Triunfo Basin tend to be extremely fragmentary. From the Poço County locality, fragments of crocodylomorph bones have been found. The Triunfo Basin is better known for presence of ichnotaxa; more than 535 individual trackways produced by dinosaurs are known from the basin. Some of these footprints may have been made by Triunfosaurus. The environment probably consisted of alluvial fans and systems of rivers.

== See also ==
- 2017 in archosaur paleontology
