= Aviadactyla =

Trace fossil classification
- Ichnogenus: †Aviadactyla; Kordos, 1985

Trace fossil

Aviadactyla is a Mesozoic bird ichnogenus. It is similar to the ichnogenus Aquatilavipes, but in this ichnogenus the toeprints fuse further from the body and have a "stick-like" character.

== See also ==
- Avipeda
