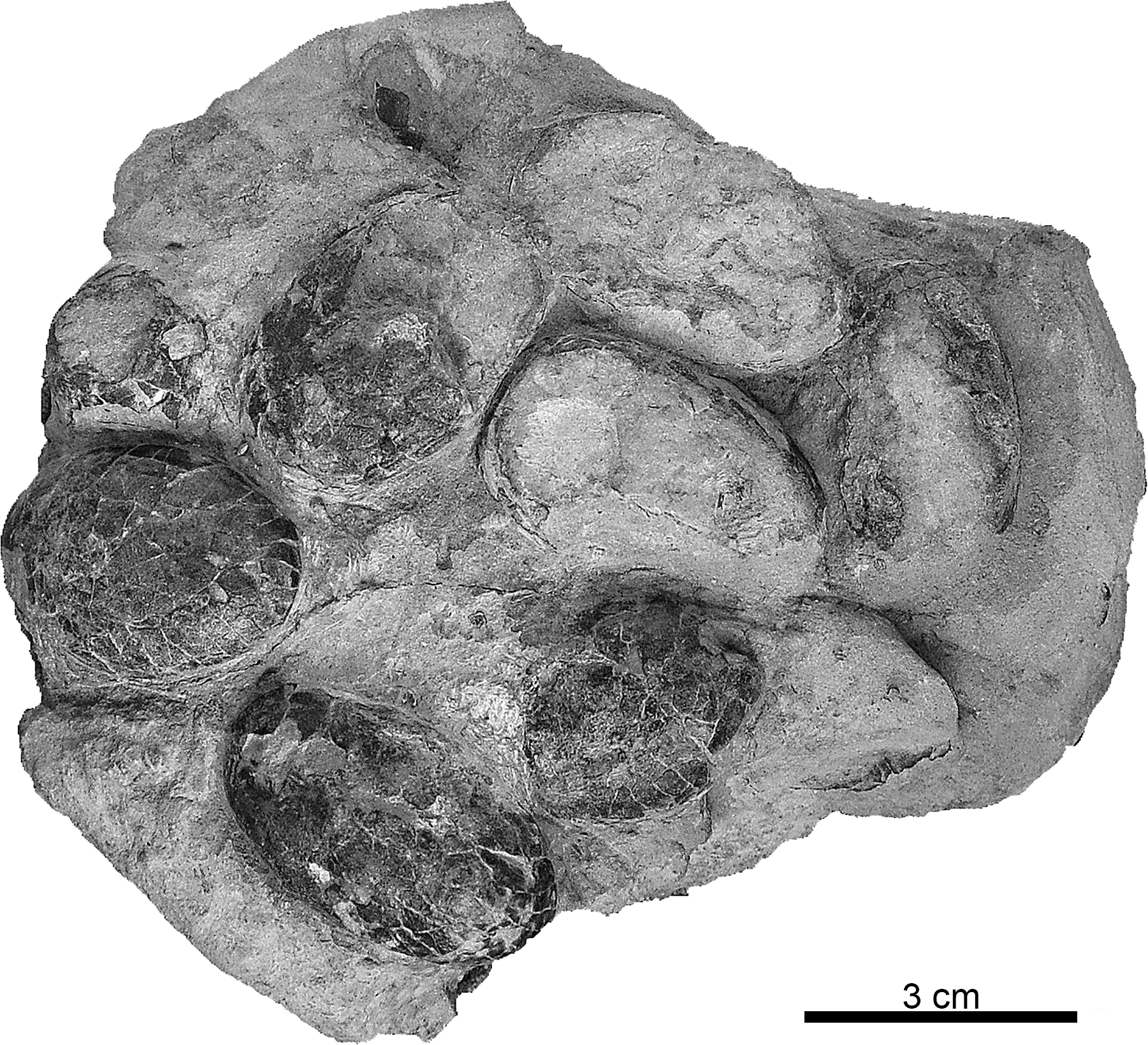
- Holotype clutch, containing 13 eggs

Egg fossil classification
- Basic shell type: †Crocodiloid
- Oofamily: †Krokolithidae
- Oogenus: †Suchoolithus; Russo et al., 2017

Oospecies
- †S. portucalensis Russo et al. 2017(type)

= Suchoolithus =

Suchoolithus Temporal range: Upper Tithonian

Suchoolithus is an oogenus (fossil egg genus) of crocodylomorph eggs from the late Jurassic of Portugal. They are notable for their small size, and for being among the oldest known crocodylomorph eggs.

== Description ==
Suchoolithus is known from a single, well-preserved egg clutch of 13 eggs. The eggs have a blunt, ellipsoid shape, and are quite small (measuring only 42 mm (1.7 in) long by 26 mm (1.0 in) across). All but two of the eggs are arranged horizontally in the clutch. The eggshell is only 163 μm thick, and is sculpted with tiny, irregular bumps on its outer surface. Like other crocodylian eggs, its shell is composed of thousands of tiny calcium carbonate crystal units; in S. portucalensis, these eggshell units are trapezoidal, tightly packed, and wider than they are tall. Russo et al. 2017 did not observe any pores openings on the eggshell's surface, though a possible pore canal was observed in one section of the shell.

== History ==
Fossil crocodylian eggs are generally rare, though they have been discovered worldwide (excepting Antarctica and Australia). In 2008, the Portuguese paleontologist Octávio Mateus discovered a fossilized egg clutch at the Lourinhã Formation of Portugal that would later become holotype of Suchoolithus. These eggs were first described in 2014 by Russo, Mateus, Balbino, and Marzola, who at the time tentatively referred them to Krokolithes, but noted their similarities to the Krokolithid Bauruoolithus. In 2016, João Russo, working with Octávio Mateus as his supervisor and Balbino as co-supervisor, completed his Master's Thesis at Faculdade de Ciências e Tecnologia da Universidade Nova de Lisboa, in which he named the oogenus and oospecies Suchoolithus portucalensis (meaning "crocodile egg stone from Portugal"). The next year, Russo, Mateus, Marzola, and Balbino published the description of Suchoolithus in PLOS One.

== Paleobiology and paleoecology ==
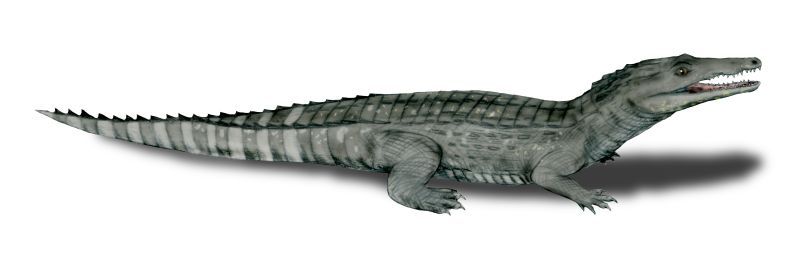
Bernissartia, a crocodylomorph from the Lourinhã Formation, and possibly the parent of Suchoolithus

Suchoolithus is known exclusively from the upper Tithonian of the Late Jurassic Lourinhã Formation of Portugal, making it (alongside Krokolithes dinophilus) the oldest known crocodylomorph egg. This formation, representing the deposits of river deltas and alluvial fans, has similar fauna and flora to the contemporaneous Morrison Formation in the United States and the Tendaguru Formation in Tanzania. Several types of crocodylomorphs are known from the late Jurassic of Portugal, but given the small size of the eggs, it is most likely that Suchoolithus were laid by one of the smaller species (perhaps less than 1 m (3.3 ft) long), such as Bernissartia, cf. Alligatorium, Lisboasaurus, Lusitanisuchus, or Theriosuchus.
