= Pandoravenator =

Pandoravenator Temporal range: Oxfordian-Tithonian, ~160–150 Ma

Scientific classification
- Kingdom: Animalia
- Phylum: Chordata
- Class: Reptilia
- Clade: Dinosauria
- Clade: Saurischia
- Clade: Theropoda
- Clade: Tetanurae
- Genus: †Pandoravenator; Rauhut & Pol, 2017

Type species
- †Pandoravenator fernandezorum Rauhut & Pol, 2017

Extinct genus of reptiles

Pandoravenator (meaning "Pandora hunter", after the type locality, "Caja de Pandora", i.e. Pandora's box) is a genus of theropod dinosaur from the Late Jurassic (Oxfordian to Tithonian) of central Patagonia (Chubut Province). Fossils in the form of a fragmentally preserved postcranial skeleton of this dinosaur were discovered and scientifically described in 2017 by paleontologists Oliver Rauhut and Diego Pol as the type species P. fernandezorum.

This dinosaur represents the first theropod discovered in the 160–150 million year old sediments of the Cañadón Calcáreo Formation, a Late Jurassic assemblage in Argentina, which has also produced remains from sauropods, neosauropods, ancient crocodiles and ancient fishes. The significance of Pandoravenator is associated with the evolution of a particular set of features that are characteristic of the averostran or tetanuran tarsus (ankle and foot). The interpretation put forward by Rauhut and Pol suggests that the unique developmental pattern seen in the astragalus of living birds arose at least at the base of Averostra, when the ceratosaur and tetanuran lineages diverged from one another, in the late Early Jurassic.

== See also ==
- 2017 in archosaur paleontology
