= Krokolithidae =

Krokolithidae Temporal range: Campanian

Egg fossil classification
- Basic shell type: †Crocodiloid
- Oofamily: †Krokolithidae; Kohring and Hirsch, 1996

Oogenera
- Krokolithes; Bauruoolithus; Suchoolithus

Oofamily of crocodylomorph

Krokolithidae is an oofamily of fossil crocodylomorph eggs. The oogenus Mycomorphoolithus is closely related to the family, but not included in it.
