= Avipeda =

Avipeda Temporal range: Albian–Early Eocene

Trace fossil classification
- Domain: Eukaryota
- Kingdom: Animalia
- Phylum: Chordata
- Class: Aves
- Ichnofamily: †Avipedidae
- Ichnogenus: †Avipeda (Vialov, 1965)

Trace fossil

Avipeda is a Mesozoic to Cenozoic bird track ichnogenus. The morphogenus is defined by having three forward facing toes without inter-digit webbing. Additionally the angles between the forward toes does not exceed 95°, while the digits are all of similar length. Avipeda is similar to the ichnogenus Aquatilavipes, but has shorter and thicker toe prints.

== See also ==
- Aviadactyla
