= Rio Piranhas Formation =

Geologic formation in Brazil

- Stratigraphic range: Berriasian-Hauterivian
- Type: Geological formation
- Unit of: Rio do Peixe Group
- Underlies: undefined
- Overlies: Sousa Formation

Lithology
- Primary: Sandstone

Location
- Coordinates: 6.7°S 38.5°W
- Approximate paleocoordinates: 4.4°S 5.6°W
- Region: Paraíba
- Country: Brazil
- Extent: Triunfo Subbasin, Rio do Peixe Basin
- Rio Piranhas Formation (Brazil)

The Rio Piranhas Formation is a Berriasian to Hauterivian geologic formation in Paraíba, Brazil. Fossil ornithopod tracks have been reported from the formation, in addition to fossils of the somphospondylan sauropod Triunfosaurus leonardii.

== Fossil content ==
Color key: Taxon / Reclassified taxon / Taxon falsely reported as present / Dubious taxon or junior synonym / Ichnotaxon / Ootaxon / Morphotaxon	Notes; Uncertain or tentative taxa are in small text; ~~crossed out~~ taxa are discredited.

=== Dinosaurs ===
==== Sauropods ====
Sauropods of the Rio Piranhas Formation
Genus	Species	Location	Stratigraphic position	Material	Notes	Images
Titanosauria Indet.	Indeterminate				Informally known as "Sousatitan"	
Triunfosaurus	T. leonardii	Triunfo Basin	Berriasian to Valanginian	Three Insolate Chevrons, Three Insolate Neural Spines & Right ischium	A somphospondylian sauropod	

== See also ==
- List of dinosaur-bearing rock formations
  - List of stratigraphic units with ornithischian tracks
    - Ornithopod tracks
