= Ludicharadripodiscus =

Trace fossil classification
- Domain: Eukaryota
- Kingdom: Animalia
- Phylum: Chordata
- Class: Aves
- Ichnofamily: †Avipedidae
- Ichnogenus: †Ludicharadripodiscus; Ellenberger 1980

Trace fossil

Ludicharadripodiscus is a Mesozoic bird ichnogenus. It is similar to the ichnogenus Aquatilavipes, but more frequently preserves impressions of the hallux.
