= Archaeornithipus =

Trace fossil classification
- Ichnogenus: †Archaeornithipus; Fuentes Vidarte, 1996

Trace fossil

Archaeornithipus was a genus of large bird ichnogenus discovered in Spain. The tracks date back to the Berriasian stage of the Cretaceous, making them among the oldest bird trace fossils in the world. However, a 2026 study found the type ichnospecies, based on penetrative tracks to be a nomem dubium.
