= Leucocarbo septentrionalis =

Leucocarbo septentrionalis Temporal range: Holocene

Scientific classification
- Kingdom: Animalia
- Phylum: Chordata
- Class: Aves
- Order: Suliformes
- Family: Phalacrocoracidae
- Genus: Leucocarbo
- Species: †L. septentrionalis

Binomial name
- †Leucocarbo septentrionalis Rawlence et al., 2017

Extinct species of bird

Leucocarbo septentrionalis, the Kohatu shag, is an extinct species of Leucocarbo that inhabited New Zealand during the Holocene epoch.
