= Limitations of animal running speed =

Factors determining maximum running speed in animals

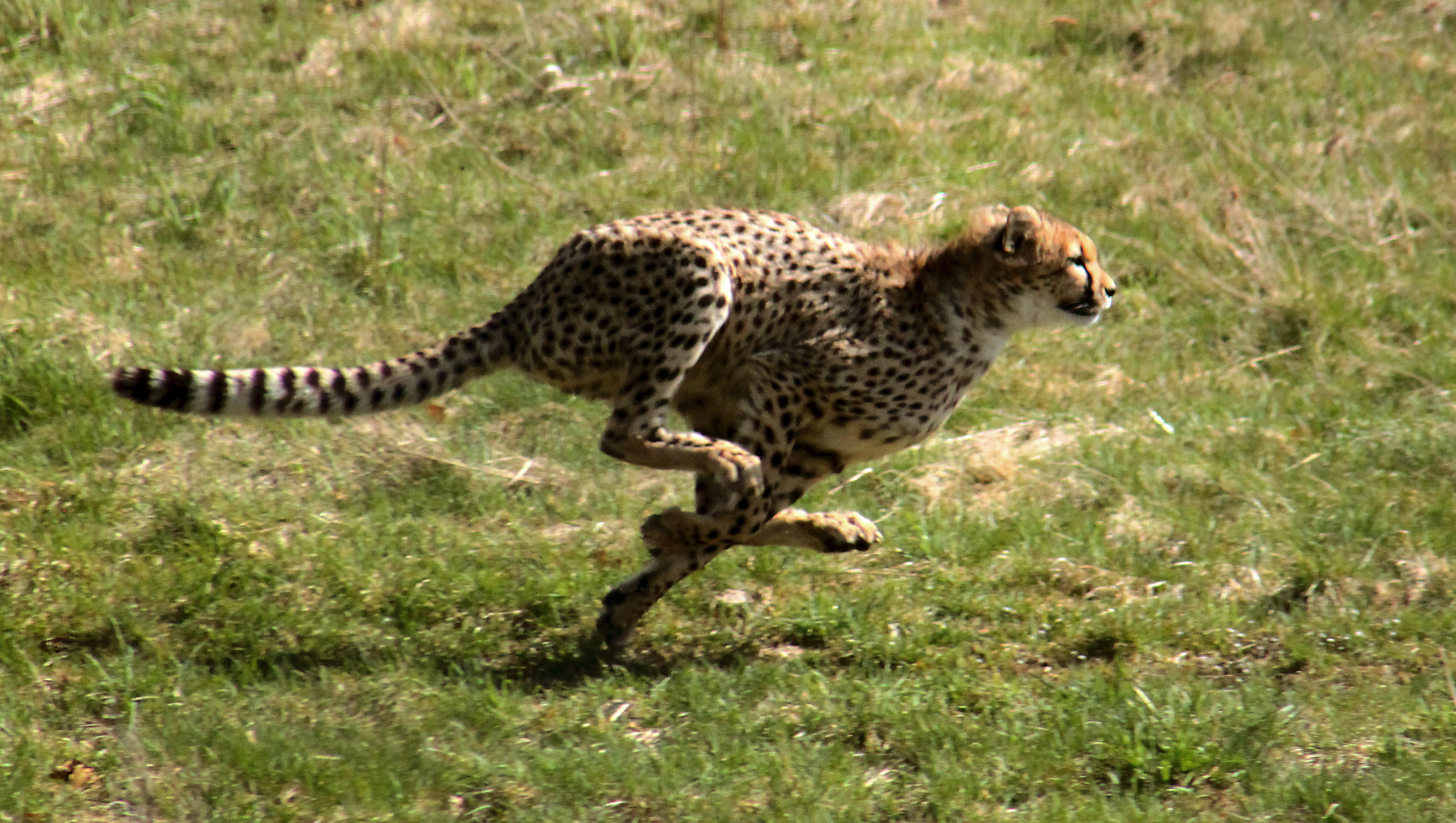
Cheetah chasing its prey. Captured at Ree Park - Ebeltoft Safari, Denmark. Photo by Malene Thyssen (http://commons.wikimedia.org/wiki/User:Malene)

Limitations of animal running speed provides an overview of how various factors determine the maximum running speed. Some terrestrial animals are built for achieving extremely high speeds, such as the cheetah, pronghorn, race horse and greyhound, while humans can train to achieve high sprint speeds. There is no single determinant of maximum running speed: however, certain factors stand out against others and have been investigated in both animals and humans. These factors include: Muscle moment arms, foot morphology, muscle architecture, and muscle fiber type. Each factor contributes to the ground reaction force (GRF) and foot contact time of which the changes to increase maximal speed are not well understood across all species.

== Ground reaction force and foot contact time ==
- GRF is a common variant which is studied in running gait. It has been shown in humans that as velocity increases, there is a linear increase in the vertical GRF. The GRF during running exceeds the body weight and therefore the extra force must be applied by the body. In a study by Weyand et al., it was shown that faster human runners achieved higher speeds by applying greater vertical GRF and not by increasing swing time. This may not be the case in cheetahs.
- Foot contact time, or stance time, is the time that the foot is in contact with the ground. There is evidence that shows that foot contact time is significantly decreased in humans as speed is increased.
- It has been shown that the fastest speeds are attained when the product of the foot contact time and vertical GRF are decreased to minimums which provides enough time for the swinging limb to get in position for the next step. Both the GRF and foot contact time are determined by variables such as muscle moment arm, foot morphology, muscle fascicle length, and muscle fiber type.

An example of torque in real life.

=== Muscle moment arm ===
A muscle's moment arm is defined as the perpendicular distance from the muscle's line of action to the joint's center of rotation. As a general rule, the larger the moment arm of a muscle, the greater torque it can produce with the same amount of force. At the same time, the muscle would cause a smaller change in joint angle for the same amount of length change. As an example, holding a wrench at the very end of the handle (point B) makes it easier to loosen a bolt, however, requires your hand to travel a greater distance compared to holding the wrench closer to the bolt (point A). Although both the cheetah and greyhound are similar in size, the cheetah can attain speeds nearly twice as fast as the greyhound. This can be explained partly by the finding that moment arms of muscles at the knee and ankle joint in the cheetah are proportionally larger than those of the greyhound. A similar comparison can be made between two similar species of lizards. It was found that geckoes more adapted for climbing have greater hip and shoulder retractor moment arms. Geckoes adapted for horizontal locomotion have greater knee and ankle extensor moment arms.

=== Foot morphology ===
A lever in balance

Foot morphology in this context mainly refers to the ratio of forefoot (in front of the ankle joint) to the hindfoot (behind the ankle joint). This ratio is an indication of the effective mechanical advantage (EMA) and can also be represented by a balancing seesaw. A study done on humans, comparing ankle-foot structure using MRI, showed that sprinters had a longer forefoot:hindfoot ratio compared to non-sprinters. This allows the foot to remain in contact with the ground for a longer amount of time while decreasing the moment arm. This decreases the rate of muscle shortening and increases the force generated by extensor muscles during the push off phase. These larger gear ratios during the push off phase have been shown to occur in accelerating humans as well as top animal sprinters. Larger moment arms of the cheetah may be achieved if the forefoot is also proportionally larger.

=== Muscle architecture and fiber type ===
Structure of a skeletal muscle

Both the architecture and type of muscle play a crucial role in determining foot contact time and production of GRF. In humans, it has been shown that sprinters have longer muscle fascicle lengths and smaller pennation angles than non-sprinters. This contributes by increasing the muscle's shortening velocity. Other studies have shown that particular muscle fiber types are favored in sprinters versus non-sprinters, as well as within different levels of sprinters. Faster individuals tend to have a greater percentage of Type II (fast-twitch) muscle fibers. Higher percentage of fast-twitch muscle fibers lead to increased force production capability, as well as increased speed of contractions leading to shorter contact times.

=== Other ===
Other factors also play a role:

- Muscle Strength
  - Larger muscles are able to generate higher amounts of force and are therefore able to produce larger GRF's
- Elastic Energy Storage
  - Cheetahs use flexion and extension of the spine to contribute significantly to speed by increasing foot contact time and swing time
- Limb muscle mass
  - Larger muscles in the limbs allow the body to accelerate faster and move at high speeds. The muscles of the legs in humans make up 9 % of their body mass. In comparison hindlimb muscles make up 16.3 % in hares, 17.5 % in impalas and 19.8 % in cheetahs, all mammals that reach high speeds.

== See also ==
- Footspeed
- Sprint (running)
