= Jindongornipes =

Trace fossil classification
- Domain: Eukaryota
- Kingdom: Animalia
- Phylum: Chordata
- Class: Aves
- Ichnofamily: †Jindongornipodidae
- Ichnogenus: †Jindongornipes; Lockley, Yang, Matsukawa, Fleming & Lim, 1992

Trace fossil

Jindongornipes was a Cretaceous bird ichnogenus. Similar fossil footprints have been discovered in the Dunvegan Formation of British Columbia. These were among the first known Cretaceous fossil bird tracks in western Canada.
