= Bauruoolithus =

Bauruoolithus Temporal range: late Campanian-early Maastrichtian ~72.1–68 Ma

Egg fossil classification
- Basic shell type: †Crocodiloid
- Oofamily: †Krokolithidae
- Oogenus: †Bauruoolithus; Oliveira et al., 2011

Oospecies
- †Bauruoolithus fragilis Oliveira et al., 2011 (type)

Trace fossil

Bauruoolithus is an oogenus of fossilized eggs belonging to an extinct crocodyliform from the Late Cretaceous (late Campanian-early Maastrichtian) of Brazil. Bauruoolithus eggs were most likely laid by the notosuchian crocodyliform Baurusuchus. Eggs of Bauruoolithus were described in 2011 from the Adamantina Formation. The type oospecies is B. fragilis.

== Description ==
Bauroolithus eggs are elongated, with a width measuring about half that of its height. The ends of the egg are blunt. At 0.15 to 0.25 millimeters in thickness, the shell is thin and somewhat wavy. The eggshell is divided into wedge-shaped shell units, which are pieces of calcareous aggregate. The surface of the shell is covered in small tear-shaped pores.

== Paleobiology ==
Bauroolithus eggs belong to the crocodyloid basic egg type. Overall, their morphology is similar to that of the eggs of living crocodylians. The eggs of living crocodylians undergo degradation over their incubation period so that hatchlings can easily break through the shells. Some fossils of Bauroolithus in Brazil are most likely from eggs that already hatched, but none show any signs of extensive degradation. This suggests that hatchlings broke through egg shells that were so thin that degradation was not necessary.
