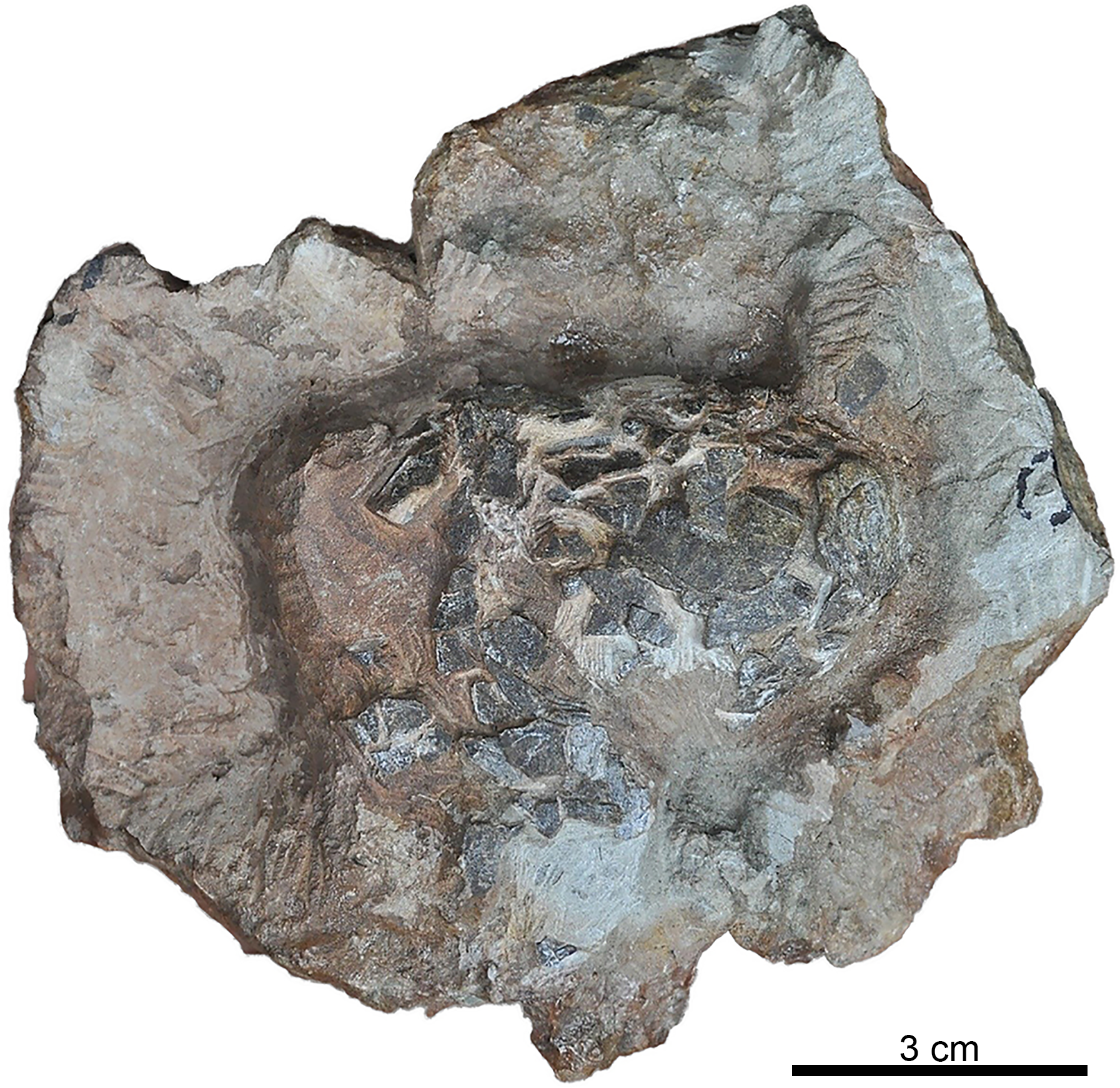
- Holotype of K. dinophilus

Egg fossil classification
- Basic shell type: †Crocodiloid
- Oofamily: †Krokolithidae
- Oogenus: †Krokolithes; Hirsch, 1985

= Krokolithes =

Krokolithes Temporal range: Tithonian-Oligocene ~150–23 Ma

Krokolithes is an oogenus of Crocodiloid eggs. These eggs were laid by an extinct species of Crocodylian. It contains three oospecies: K. dinophilus, K. wilsoni and K. helleri. 1 Fossils of the oogenus have been found in the Oligocene of France, the Oldman and Dinosaur Park Formations of Alberta, Canada, the Campanian Two Medicine Formation of Montana, the Barremian Cabezo Gordo Member of the Blesa Formation of Spain, and the Kimmeridgian of the Lourinhã Formation of Portugal.
