= Ichnotaxon =

Taxon based on the fossilized work of an organism

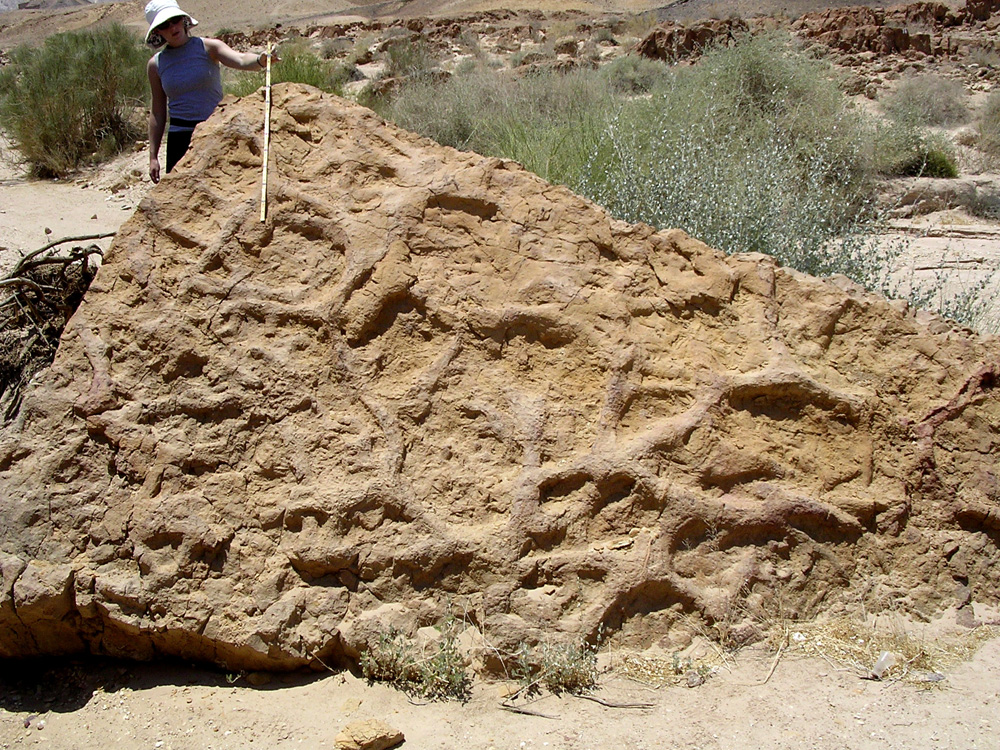
The ichnogenus Thalassinoides: burrow fossil produced by crustaceans from the Middle Jurassic, HaMakhtesh HaKatan, southern Israel

An ichnotaxon (plural ichnotaxa) is "a taxon based on the fossilized work of an organism", i.e. the non-human equivalent of an artifact. Ichnotaxon comes from the Ancient Greek ἴχνος (íchnos) meaning "track" and English taxon, itself derived from Ancient Greek τάξις (táxis) meaning "ordering".

Ichnotaxa are names used to identify and distinguish morphologically distinctive ichnofossils, more commonly known as trace fossils (fossil records of lifeforms' movement, rather than of the lifeforms themselves). They are assigned genus and species ranks by ichnologists, much like organisms in Linnaean taxonomy. These are known as ichnogenera and ichnospecies, respectively. "Ichnogenus" and "ichnospecies" are commonly abbreviated as "igen." and "isp.". The binomial names of ichnospecies and their genera are to be written in italics.

Most researchers classify trace fossils only as far as the ichnogenus rank, based upon trace fossils that resemble each other in morphology but have subtle differences. Some authors have constructed detailed hierarchies up to ichnosuperclass, recognizing such fine detail as to identify ichnosuperorder and ichnoinfraclass, but such attempts are controversial.

== Naming ==
Due to the chaotic nature of trace fossil classification, several ichnogenera hold names normally affiliated with animal body fossils or plant fossils. For example, many ichnogenera are named with the suffix -phycus due to misidentification as algae.

Edward Hitchcock was the first to use the now common -ichnus suffix in 1858, with Cochlichnus.

== History ==
Due to ichnofossils' history of being difficult to classify, there have been several attempts to enforce consistency in the naming of ichnotaxa.

The first edition of the International Code of Zoological Nomenclature, published in 1961, ruled that names of taxa published after 1930 should be 'accompanied by a statement that purports to give characters differentiating the taxon'. This had the effect that names for most ichnofossil taxa published after 1930 were unavailable under the code. This restriction was removed for ichnotaxa in the third edition of the code, published in 1985.

== See also ==
- Bird ichnology
- Trace fossil classification
- Glossary of scientific naming
