= Taxonomy of the vertebrates (Young, 1962) =

1962 classification system

The taxonomy of the vertebrates presented by John Zachary Young in The Life of Vertebrates (1962) is a system of classification with emphasis on this group of animals.

== Phylum Chordata ==
- Phylum Chordata [p. 24]
  - Subphylum 1. Hemichordata (e.g., Balanoglossus, Cephalodiscus, Rhabdopleura)
  - Subphylum 2. Cephalochordata (= Acrania) (e.g., Branchiostoma)
  - Subphylum 3. Tunicata (e.g., Ciona)
  - Subphylum 4. Vertebrata (= Craniata)
    - Superclass 1. Agnatha
      - Class 1. Cyclostomata
      - Class 2. †Cephalaspidomorphi (e.g., †Cephalaspis)
      - Class 3. †Pteraspidomorphi (e.g., †Pteraspis)
      - Class 4. †Anaspida (e.g., †Birkenia, †Jamoytius)
    - Superclass 2. Gnathostomata
      - Class 1. †Placodermi (e.g., †Acanthodes)
      - Class 2. Elasmobranchii
      - Class 3. Actinopterygii
      - Class 4. Crossopterygii
      - Class 5. Amphibia
      - Class 6. Reptilia
      - Class 7. Aves
      - Class 8. Mammalia

=== Subphylum Vertebrata (= Craniata) ===
==== Superclass Agnatha ====
- Subphylum Vertebrata (= Craniata)
  - Superclass 1. Agnatha [p. 81]
    - Class 1. Cyclostomata
      - Order 1. Petromyzontia (e.g., Petromyzon, Lampetra, Entosphenus, Geotria, Mordacia)
      - Order 2. Myxinoidea (e.g., Myxine, Bdellostoma)
    - Class 2. †Osteostraci (e.g., †Cephalaspis, †Tremataspis)
    - Class 3. †Anaspida (e.g., †Birkenia, †Jamoytius)
    - Class 4. †Heterostraci (e.g., †Astraspis, †Pteraspis, †Drepanaspis)
    - Class 5. †Coelolepida (e.g., †Thelodus, †Lanarkia)

==== Superclass Gnathostomata ====
===== Class Elasmobranchii =====
- Superclass 2. Gnathostomata
  - Class Elasmobranchii (= Chondrichthyes) [p. 175]
    - Subclass 1. Selachii
      - Order 1. †Cladoselachii (e.g., †Cladoselache, †Goodrichia)
      - Order 2. †Pleuracanthodii (e.g., †Pleuracanthus)
      - Order 3. Protoselachii (e.g., †Hybodiis, Heterodontus)
      - Order 4. Euselachii
        - Suborder 1. Pleurotremata
          - Division 1. Notidanoidea (e.g., Hexanchus, Chlamydoselache)
          - Division 2. Galeoidea (e.g., Scyliorhinus, Mustelus, Cetorhinus, Carcharodon)
          - Division 3. Squaloidea (e.g., Squalus, Squatina, Pristiophorus, Alopias)
        - Suborder 2. Hypotremata (e.g., Raja, Rhinobatis, Pristis, Torpedo, Trygon)
    - Subclass 2. Bradyodonti
      - Order 1. †Eubradyodonti (e.g., †Helodus)
      - Order 2. Holocephali (e.g., Chimaera)

===== Class Actinopterygii =====
- Class Actinopterygii [p. 228]
  - Superorder 1. Chondrostei
    - Order 1. Palaeoniscoidei (e.g., †Cheirolepis, †Palaeoniscus, †Amphicentrum, †Platysomus, †Dorypterus, †Cleithrolepis, †Tarrasius, Polypterus [bichir])
    - Order 2. Acipenseroidei (e.g., †Chondrosteus, Acipenser [sturgeon], Polyodon [paddle-fish])
    - Order 3. Subholostei (e.g., †Ptycholepis)
  - Superorder 2. Holostei (e.g., †Acentrophorus, †Lepidotes, †Dapedius, †Microdon, Amia [bowfin], Lepisosteus [gar-pike])
  - Superorder 3. Teleostei
    - Order 1. Isospondyli (e.g., †Leptolepis, †Portheus, Clupea [herring], Salmo [trout])
    - Order 2. Ostariophysi (e.g., Cyprinus [carp], Tinea [tench], Silurus [catfish])
    - Order 3. Apodes (e.g., Anguilla [eel], Conger [conger eel])
    - Order 4. Mesichthyes (e.g., Esox [pike], Belone, Exocoetus [flying fish], Gasterosteus [stickle-back], Syngnathus [pipe-fish], Hippocampus [seahorse])
    - Order 5. Acanthopterygii (e.g., †Hoplopteryx, Zens [John Dory], Perca [perch], Labrus [wrasse], Uranoscopus [star gazer], Blennius [blenny], Gadus [whiting], Pleuronectes [plaice], Solea [sole], Lophius [angler-fish])

===== Class Crossopterygii =====
- Class Crossopterygii [p. 268]
  - Order 1. Rhipidistia
    - Suborder 1. †Osteolepidoti (e.g., †Osteolepis, †Sauripterus, †Diplopterax, †Eusthenopteron)
    - Suborder 2. Coelacanthini (= Actinistia) (e.g., †Coelacanthus, †Undina, Latimeria)
  - Order 2. Dipnoi (e.g., †Dipterus, †Ceratodus, Neoceratodus, Protopterus, Lepidosiren)

===== Class Amphibia =====
- Class Amphibia [p. 296]
  - Subclass 1. †Stegocephalia
    - Order 1. †Labyrinthodontia
      - Suborder 1. †Ichthyostegalia (e.g., †Ichthyostega, †Elpistostege)
      - Suborder 2. †Embolomeri (e.g., †Eogyrinus, †Loxomma)
      - Suborder 3. †Rhachitomi (e.g., †Eryops, †Cacops)
      - Suborder 4. †Stereospondyli (e.g., †Capitosaurus, †Buettneria)
    - Order 2. †Phyllospondyli (e.g., †Branchiosaurus)
    - Order 3. †Lepospondyli (e.g., †Dolichosoma, †Diplocaulus, †Microbrachis)
    - Order 4. †Adelospondyli (e.g., †Lysorophus)
  - Subclass 2. Urodela (= Caudata) (e.g., Molge, Salamandra, Ambystoma, Necturus)
  - Subclass 3. Anura (= Salientia) (e.g., †Miobatrachus, †Protobatrachiis, Rana, Bufo, Hyla, Pipa)
  - Subclass 4. Apoda (= Gymnophiona = Caecilia) (e.g., Ichthyophis, Typhlonectes)

===== Class Reptilia =====
- Class Reptilia [p. 369]
  - Subclass 1. Anapsida
    - Order 1. †Cotylosauria (e.g., †Seymouria, †Captorhinus, †Diadectes)
    - Order 2. Chelonia (e.g., †Eunotosaurus, †Triassochelys, Chelys, Emys, Chelone, Testudo)
  - Subclass 2. †Synaptosauria
    - Order 1. †Protorosauria (e.g., †Araeoscelis, †Tanystropheus)
    - Order 2. †Sauropterygia (e.g., †Lariosaurus, †Pliosaurus, †Plesiosaurus, †Placodus)
  - Subclass 3. †Ichthyopterygia
    - Order 1. †Ichthyosauria (e.g., †Mixosaurus, †Ichthyosaurus)
  - Subclass 4. Lepidosauria
    - Order 1. †Eosuchia (e.g., †Youngina, †Prolacerta)
    - Order 2. Rhynchocephalia (e.g., †Homoesaurus, †Rhynchosaurus, Sphenodon [= Hatteria])
    - Order 3. Squamata
      - Suborder 1. Lacertilia (= Sauria)
        - Infraorder 1. Gekkota (e.g., Gecko)
        - Infraorder 2. Iguania (e.g., Iguana, Anolis, Phrynosoma, Draco, Lyriocephalus, Agama, Chamaeleo)
        - Infraorder 3. Scincomorpha (e.g., Lacerta, Scincus, Amphisbaena)
        - Infraorder 4. Anguimorpha (e.g., †Dolichosaurus, †Aigialosaurus, †Tylosaurus, Varanus, Lanthanotus, Anguis)
      - Suborder 2. Ophidia (= Serpentes) (e.g., †Palaeophis, Python, Natrix, Naja, Vipera)
  - Subclass 5. Archosauria
    - Order 1. †Pseudosuchia (= †Thecodontia) (e.g., †Euparkeria, †Saltoposuchus)
    - Order 2. †Phytosauria (e.g., †Phytosaurus, †Mystriosuchus)
    - Order 3. Crocodilia (e.g., †Protosuchus, Crocodilus, Alligator, Caiman, Gavialis)
    - Order 4. †Saurischia
      - Suborder 1. †Theropoda (e.g., †Compsognathus, †Ornitholestes, †Allosaurus, †Tyrannosaurus, †Struthiomimus)
      - Suborder 2. †Sauropoda (e.g., †Apatosaurus [= †Brontosaurus], †Diplodocus, †Yaleosaurus, †Plateosaurus, Brachiosaurus)
    - Order 5. †Ornithischia
      - Suborder 1. †Ornithopoda (e.g., †Camptosaurus, †Iguanodon, †Hadrosaurus)
      - Suborder 2. †Stegosauria (e.g., †Stegosaurus)
      - Suborder 3. †Ankylosauria (e.g., †Ankylosaurus, †Nodosaurus)
      - Suborder 4. †Ceratopsia (e.g., †Triceratops)
    - Order 6. †Pterosauria (e.g., †Rhamphorhynchus, †Pteranodon)
  - Subclass 6. †Synapsida [pp. 370, 533]
    - Order 1. †Pelycosauria (= †Theromorpha) (e.g., †Varanosaurus, †Edaphosaurus, †Dimetrodon)
    - Order 2. †Therapsida
      - Suborder 1. †Dicynodontia (e.g., †Galepus, †Moschops, †Dicynodon, †Kannemeyeria)
      - Suborder 2. †Theriodontia (e.g., †Cynognathus, †Scymnognathus, †Bauria, †Dromatherium, †Tritylodon, †Oligokyphus)
    - Order 3. †Mesosauria (= †Proganosauria) (e.g., †Mesosaurus)

===== Class Aves =====
- Class Aves [p. 509]
  - Subclass 1. †Archaeornithes (e.g., †Archaeopteryx)
  - Subclass 2. Neornithes
    - Superorder 1. †Odontognathae (e.g., †Hesperornis, †Ichthyornis)
    - Superorder 2. Palaeognathae [ratites] (e.g., Struthio, Rhea, Dromiceius, Casuarius, †Dinornis, †Aepyornis, Apteryx, Tinamus)
    - Superorder 3. Impennae [penguins] (e.g., Spheniscus, Aptenodytes)
    - Superorder 4. Neognathae
      - Order 1. Gaviiformes [loons] (e.g., Gavia [loon])
      - Order 2. Colymbiformes [grebes] (e.g., Colymbus [= Podiceps] [grebe])
      - Order 3. Procellariiformes [petrels] (e.g., Fulmarus [petrel], Puffinus [shearwater], Diomedea [albatross])
      - Order 4. Pelecaniformes (e.g., Phalacrocorax [cormorant], Pelecanus [pelican], Sida [gannet])
      - Order 5. Ciconiiformes (e.g., Ciconia [stork], Ardea [heron], Phoenicopterus [flamingo])
      - Order 6. Anseriformes [ducks] (e.g., Anas [duck], Cygnus [swan])
      - Order 7. Falconiformes [hawks] (e.g., Falco [kestrel], Aquila [eagle], Buteo [buzzard], Neophron [vulture], Milvus [kite])
      - Order 8. Galliformes [game birds] (e.g., Gallus [fowl], Phasianus [pheasant], Perdix [partridge], Lagopus [grouse], Meleagris [turkey], Numida [guinea fowl], Pavo [peacock], Opisthocomus [hoatzin])
      - Order 9. Gruiformes [rails] (e.g., Fulica [coot], Gallinula [moorhen], Crex [corn-crake], Grus [crane], †Phororhacos, †Diatryma)
      - Order 10. Charadriiformes [waders and gulls] (e.g., Numenius [curlew], Capella [snipe], Calidris [sandpiper], Vanellus [lapwing], Scolopax [woodcock], Larus [gull], Uria [guillemot], Plautus [little auk])
      - Order 11. Columbiformes [pigeons] (e.g., Columba [pigeon], †Raphus [dodo])
      - Order 12. Cuculiformes [cuckoos] (e.g., Cuculus [cuckoo])
      - Order 13. Psittaciformes [parrots]
      - Order 14. Strigiformes [owls] (e.g., Athene [little owl], Tyto [farm owl], Strix [tawny owl])
      - Order 15. Caprimulgiformes [nightjars] (e.g., Caprimulgus [nightjar])
      - Order 16. Micropodiformes (e.g., Apus [swift], Trochilus [humming-bird])
      - Order 17. Coraciiformes (e.g., Merops [bee-eater], Alcedo [kingfisher])
      - Order 18. Piciformes [woodpeckers] (e.g., Picus [woodpecker])
      - Order 19. Passeriformes [perching birds] (e.g., Corvus [rook], Sturnus [starling], Fringilla [finch], Passer [house-sparrow], Alauda [lark], Anthus [pipit], Motacilla [wagtail], Certhia [tree-creeper], Parus [tit], Lanius [shrike], Sylvia [warbler], Turdus [thrush], Erithacus [British robin], Luscinia [nightingale], Prunella [hedge-sparrow], Troglodytes [wren], Hirundo [swallow])

===== Class Mammalia =====
- Class Mammalia [p. 533]
  - Subclass 1. Eotheria
    - Order †Docodonta (e.g., †Morganucodon, †Docodon)
    - Order incertae sedis †Diarthrognathus
  - Subclass 2. Prototheria
    - Order Monotremata (e.g., Tachyglossus [= Echidna] [spiny anteater], Zaglossus [= Proechidna], Ornithorhynchus [platypus])
  - Subclass 3. †Allotheria
    - Order †Multituberculata (e.g., †Plagiaulax, †Ptilodus)
  - Subclass 4. Theria
    - Infraclass 1. †Pantotheria
      - Order 1. †Eupantotheria (e.g., †Amphitherium)
      - Order 2. †Symmetrodonta (e.g., †Spalacotherium)
    - Infraclass 2. Metatheria
      - Order Marsupialia
    - Infraclass 3. Eutheria (= Placentalia)
      - Order incertae sedis †Triconodonta (e.g., †Amphilestes, †Triconodon)

====== Infraclass Metatheria ======
- Infraclass 2. Metatheria [p. 563]
  - Order Marsupialia
    - Superfamily 1. Didelphoidea (e.g., †Eodelphis, Didelphis [opossum], Chironectes [water opossum])
    - Superfamily 2. †Borhyaenoidea (e.g., †Thylacosmilus, †Borhyaena)
    - Superfamily 3. Dasyuroidea (e.g., Dasyurus [native cat], Sarcophilus [Tasmanian devil], Thylacinus [Tasmanian wolf], Myrmecobius [banded ant-eater], Notoryctes [marsupial mole], Sminthopsis [pouched mouse])
    - Superfamily 4. Perameloidea (e.g., Perameles [bandicoot])
    - Superfamily 5. Caenolestoidea (e.g., †Palaeothentes [= †Epanorthus], Caenolestes [opossum-rat])
    - Superfamily 6. Phalangeroidea (e.g., Trichosurus [Australian opossum], Petaurus [flying opossum], Phascolarctos [koala bear], Vombatus [wombat], Macropus [kangaroo], Bettongia [rat kangaroo], †Diprotodon, †Thylacoleo)

====== Infraclass Eutheria ======
- Infraclass 3. Eutheria [p. 577]
  - Cohort 1. Unguiculata
    - Order 1. Insectivora [p. 581]
    - Order 2. Chiroptera [p. 585]
    - Order 3. Dermoptera
    - Order 4. †Taeniodonta
    - Order 5. †Tillodontia
    - Order 6. Edentata [p. 592]
    - Order 7. Pholidota
    - Order 8. Primates [p. 602]
  - Cohort 2. Glires [p. 653]
    - Order 1. Rodentia
    - Order 2. Lagomorpha
  - Cohort 3. Mutica [p. 666]
    - Order Cetacea
  - Cohort 4. Ferungulata
    - Superorder 1. Ferae [p. 679]
      - Order Carnivora
    - Superorder 2. Protungulata [p. 699]
      - Order 1. †Condylarthra
      - Order 2. †Notoungulata
      - Order 3. †Litopterna
      - Order 4. †Astrapotheria
      - Order 5. Tubulidentata
    - Superorder 3. Paenungulata [p. 706]
      - Order 1. Hyracoidea
      - Order 2. Proboscidea
      - Order 3. †Pantodonta
      - Order 4. †Dinocerata
      - Order 5. †Pyrotheria
      - Order 6. †Embrithopoda
      - Order 7. Sirenia
    - Superorder 4. Mesaxonia [p. 723]
      - Order Perissodactyla
    - Superorder 5. Paraxonia [p. 745]
      - Order Artiodactyla

====== Order Primates ======
- Order 8. Primates [p. 602]
  - Suborder 1. Prosimii
    - Infraorder 1. Lemuriformes
      - Family 1. †Plesiadapidae (e.g., †Plesiadapis)
      - Family 2. †Adapidae (e.g., †Notharctus, †Adapis)
      - Family 3. Lemuridae (e.g., †Megaladapis, Lemur [common lemur])
      - Family 4. Indridae (e.g., Indri [indris])
      - Family 5. Daubentoniidae (e.g., Daubentonia [= Cheiromys] [aye-aye])
    - Infraorder 2. Lorisiformes
      - Family. Lorisidae (e.g., Loris [slender loris], Galago [bush baby], Perodicticus [potto])
    - Infraorder 3. Tarsiiformes
      - Family 1. †Anaptomorphidae (e.g., †Necrolemur, †Pseudoloris)
      - Family 2. Tarsiidae (e.g., Tarsius [tarsier])
  - Suborder 2. Anthropoidea
    - Superfamily 1. Ceboidea [New World monkeys]
      - Family 1. Callithricidae (e.g., Callithrix [= Hapale] [marmoset])
      - Family 2. Cebidae (e.g., †Homunculus, Cebus [capuchin], Ateles [spider monkey], Alouatta [howler monkey])
    - Superfamily 2. Cercopithecoidea
      - Family 1. †Parapithecidae (e.g., †Parapithecus)
      - Family 2. Cercopithecidae [Old World monkeys] (e.g., †Mesopithecus, Macaca [rhesus monkey, macaque], Papio [baboon], Mandrillus [mandrill], Cercopithecus [guenon], Presbytis [langur], Colobus, [guereza])
    - Superfamily 3. Hominoidea
      - Family 1. Pongidae apes (e.g., †Propliopithecus, †Pliopithecus, †Dryopithecus, †Oreopithecus †Australopithecus, †Proconsul, Hylobates gibbon, Pongo orangutan, Pan chimpanzee, Gorilla gorilla)
      - Family 2. Hominidae human (e.g., †Pithecanthropus [= †Sinanthropus] [Java and Pekin man], Homo [human ("all living races")])
