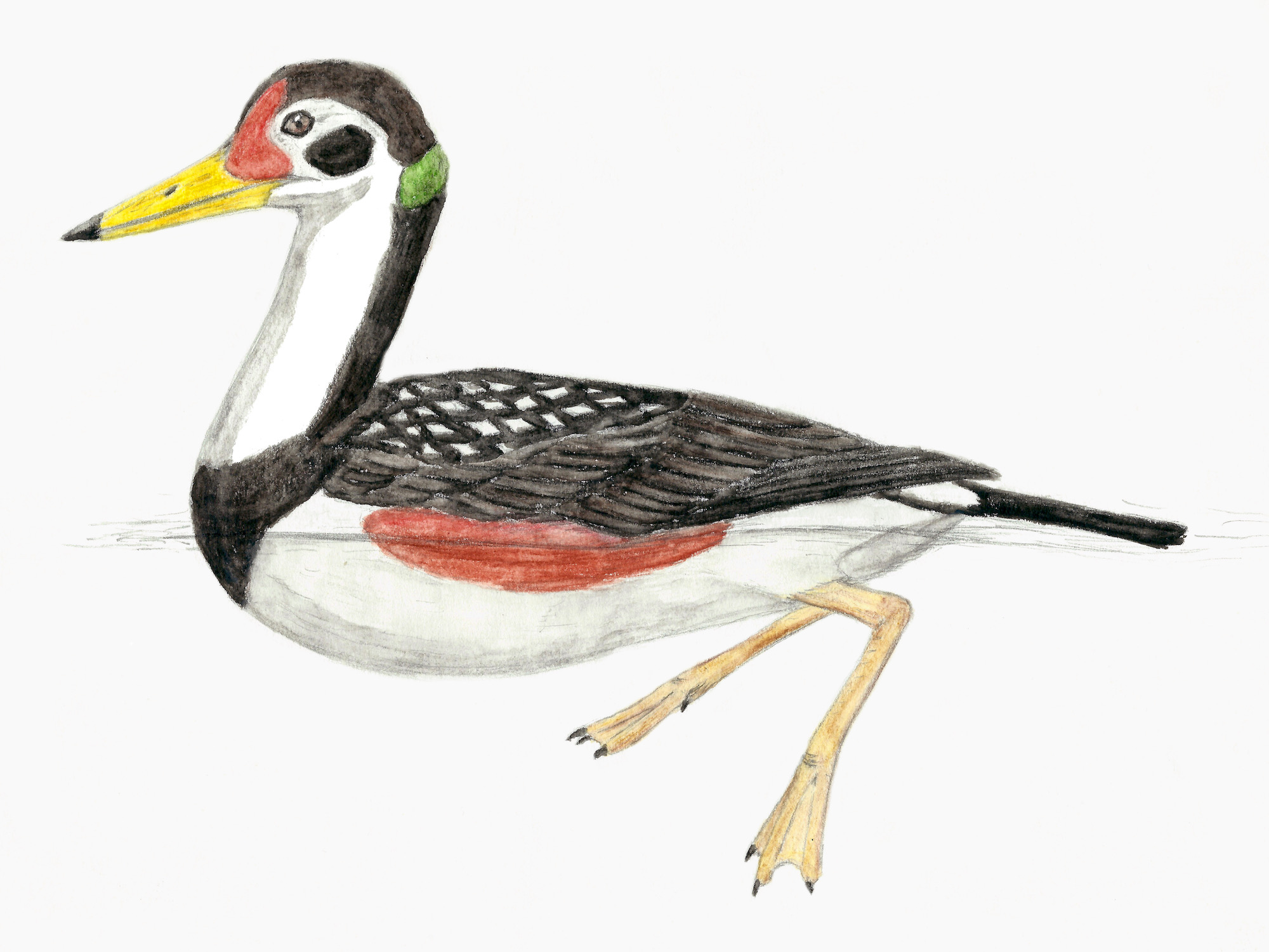
- Life restoration of Vegavis iaai

Scientific classification
- Kingdom: Animalia
- Phylum: Chordata
- Class: Aves
- Order: incertae sedis
- Family: †Vegaviidae; Agnolín et al., 2017

Genera
- †Vegavis; †Polarornis?; †Australornis?; †Neogaeornis?; †Maaqwi?

= Vegaviidae =

Vegaviidae Temporal range: Maastrichtian–Danian Uncertain Campanian and Paleogene records

Extinct family of birds

Vegaviidae is a proposed extinct family of neognathous, possibly anseriform birds which lived during the Late Cretaceous and possibly the Paleocene. The monophyly of the family has been questioned by subsequent studies, with the only definitive member Vegavis known from the Maastrichtian stage of Antarctica, though some fossil genera from other continents have been assigned to this clade.

== Taxonomic history ==
In 2017, Agnolín and colleagues performed a phylogenetic analysis of various extinct avian genera from the Late Cretaceous of Southern Hemisphere including Vegavis. They found support for those genera making up a family of birds showing specializations to diving, and proposed the family Vegaviidae which is classified as stem-Anseriformes. They also suggested that some fragmentary specimens from the Paleogene of New Zealand, Chile and Antarctica represent indeterminate vegaviids, providing evidence that some families of modern birds crossed the K–Pg boundary unaffected by the extinction event that occurred, with Gondwana having an important role for the evolution of modern birds.

Worthy et al. (2017) focused on the evolution and phylogenetic relationships of giant fowl and found weak support for Vegaviidae, included within their proposed order "Vegaviiformes", being the sister taxon to Gastornithiformes (the clade including Gastornithidae and the mihirungs). However, "Vegaviiformes" is a disused clade that has never been mentioned by other researchers except for the describers of Conflicto antarcticus. McLachlan et al. (2017) described a putative Campanian vegaviid Maaqwi from Canada and found an alternative position for vegaviids as stem-birds in the more inclusive clade Ornithurae.

However, subsequent studies have questioned the monophyly of this proposed family. In 2018, Gerald Mayr and colleagues reviewed vegaviid systematics and stated that while Vegavis and Polarornis are likely sister genera based on overall similarities in their femur and tibiotarsal bones, the inclusion of other taxa, particularly Australornis, is poorly supported. Furthermore, they argued that comparison of the plesiomorphic traits of the pterygoid and the mandible does not seem to firmly establish anseriform or galloanserine affinities for Vegaviidae, and commented that to try to classify all southern hemisphere birds into a single clade is premature as it may not illustrate the complex relationships and the convergent evolution birds have undergone. It is uncertain whether Neogaeornis belongs to the family since the specimen shows traits of other bird groups including those of grebes and loons, but if it were true, then both Neogaeornis and potentially the closely related Antarcticavis might represent vegaviids. Maaqwi, on the other hand, more likely belongs to the Procellariiformes.

The definitive vegaviid by definition, Vegavis, was recovered in various positions by other researchers as a crown group bird outside Galloanserae, a sister taxon of the Neornithes or at the base of Neognathae with an unresolved position. In contrast, Vegavis was recovered as a sister taxon of Anatidae or Anseriformes within Galloanserae based on phylogenetic analyses in 2024. In a 2025 study which described a nearly complete skull of Vegavis, Torres et al. supported its placement within crown group Anseriformes, sister to Conflicto and Anas, based on their revised phylogenetic analyses. However, they did not consider the family Vegaviidae to be valid and argued that the reported specimens of Polarornis are too poorly preserved to resolve its taxonomic affinities. In their 2025 description of Pujatopouli, Irazoqui and colleagues also did not classify Vegavis and Polarornis as sister taxa, recovering the former as a member of the Galloanserae and the latter as a member of the Aequornithes based on the Neornithes dataset. In 2026, Irazoqui et al. suggested that Vegavis can only be confidently placed as a neognath of uncertain affinities.
