= Nasidytes =

Nasidytes Temporal range: Early Eocene (Ypresian), 55–54.6 Ma

Scientific classification
- Kingdom: Animalia
- Phylum: Chordata
- Class: Aves
- Order: Gaviiformes
- Genus: †Nasidytes; Mayr & Kitchener, 2022

Type species
- †Nasidytes ypresianus Mayr & Kitchener, 2022

Extinct water bird

Nasidytes is an extinct genus of loon (Gaviiformes) that lived during the early Eocene in what is now Great Britain. It contains a single species, N. ypresianus. Nasidytes is the earliest unambiguously identified loon in the fossil record.

== Discovery and naming ==
The holotype of Nasidytes ypresianus, NMS.Z.2021.40.24, was collected in 1992 by Michael Daniels, in Walton-on-the-Naze, Essex, UK. It is from the Walton Member of the London Clay Formation. The holotype is a partial skeleton including the mandible and most major wing, pectoral girdle, and leg bones. NMS.Z.2021.40.25, a left carpometacarpus collected in 1996 by Daniels, has also been referred to N. ypresianus.

In 2022, Gerald Mayr and Andrew C Kitchener described Nasidytes ypresianus. The generic name is derived from the Latin nasus ("nose", in reference to the semantically related word "Naze" in the name of the type locality) and the Greek δύτες (dytes), meaning "diver". The specific name refers to the Ypresian age of the Eocene, when the holotype dates to.

== Description ==
The skeleton displays marked differences from modern loons, more closely resembling fellow fossil loons Colymbiculus and Colymboides. The mandible of Nasidytes is more like that of coots in its proportions than that of modern loons, indicating Nasidytes had a proportionally shorter and wider beak than its living relatives. The single preserved thoracic vertebra exhibits hollow spaces called pleurocoels, which are present in many neornithine stem group representatives but not in modern loons. The carpometacarpus is long, more than half the length of the humerus; a long carpometacarpus is a derived trait of gaviiforms. The pedal phalanges, particularly those of the second toe, are elongated, as in modern loons and many other water birds. One of the ungual phalanges is preserved and has a shape characteristic for many birds with webbed feet.

== Classification ==
Phylogenetic analysis found Nasidytes to be the most basal member of Gaviiformes.

- Gaviiformes
  - †Nasidytes ypresianus
  - - †Colymbiculus udovichenkoi
    - - †Colymboides minutus
      - - †"?Colymboides metzleri"
        - - †Petralca austriaca
          - crown group Gaviiformes

== Paleobiology ==
Because of its differently-shaped beak, Nasidytes probably wasn't a pursuit predator of fish like modern loons, which have long, narrow, dagger-like beaks. Instead, with its shorter, wider beak, Nasidytes likely fed mainly on marine invertebrates.

Though Nasidytes was aquatic, it was less adapted for sustained foot-propelled diving than modern loons. According to Mayr and Kitchener, "Nasidytes might have had a coot- or diving duck-like ecology, performing short, foot-propelled dives in search for food."

== Paleoenvironment ==
The sediments Nasidytes was found in represent a nearshore marine environment.

== See also ==
- List of bird species described in the 2020s
