= Neogaeornis =

Neogaeornis Temporal range: Maastrichtian ~70–67 Ma

Scientific classification
- Kingdom: Animalia
- Phylum: Chordata
- Class: Aves
- Order: incertae sedis
- Family: †Vegaviidae (?)
- Genus: †Neogaeornis; Lambrecht, 1929
- Species: †N. wetzeli

Binomial name
- †Neogaeornis wetzeli Lambrecht, 1929

Synonyms
- Neogaeornis welltsii (lapsus)

Extinct genus of birds

Neogaeornis is a controversial prehistoric genus of diving bird like dinosaur. Because they classified versus The single known species, Neogaeornis wetzeli, was described diving bird from fossils found in the Campanian to Maastrichtian Quiriquina Formation of Chile. It lived about 70-67 million years ago. It remains known from the single tarsometatarsus described in 1929 by Lambrecht, and today housed in the Paläontologisches Institut und Museum in Kiel, Germany.

== Taxonomy ==
It is controversial because of its uncertain placement. While clearly related to modern birds, N. wetzeli might not be a particularly close relative, but rather belong to the Baptornithidae, a member of the flightless and toothed Hesperornithes. If this is so, Neogaeornis is among the very youngest records of this lineage, and the first one from the Southern Hemisphere. However, the Hesperornithiformes are known to have been birds of the open epicontinental and shelf seas which avoided the outer oceans as surrounded South America at that time. And though apparently somewhat migratory, they are only known from temperate to warm subtropical climates, and it seems that towards the end of the Cretaceous their range shifted polewards.

Others consider it a close relative of certain modern birds, such as the Gaviiformes (loons/divers). Both theories are problematic, as neither group is known from the Southern Hemisphere. The even more controversial supposed loon ancestor Polarornis from Seymour Island, Antarctica presents a similar dilemma and Neogaeornis and there is little consensus about the age of Polarornis, and so all that can be said is that Polarornis and Neogaeornis were similarly sized birds with similar lifestyles.

Most recent phylogenetic studies seem to favour its position as a basal loon. Alongside Polarornis and some yet unnamed Antarctic specimens, it seems to suggest a Gondwanan origin for this group. In 2017 a phylogenetic study Agnolín and colleagues have found Neogaeornis to be stem-anseriforms along with Polarornis, Australornis and Vegavis in the family Vegaviidae. Gerald Mayr suggested that it is uncertain whether Neogaeornis belongs to the family since the specimen shows traits of other bird groups including those of podicipediform and gaviiform, but if it were true, then both Neogaeornis and possibly the closely related Antarcticavis might represent vegaviids.
