= Australornis =

Australornis Temporal range: Danian, Paleocene 61.5–60.6 Ma

Scientific classification
- Kingdom: Animalia
- Phylum: Chordata
- Class: Aves
- Order: incertae sedis
- Family: †Vegaviidae (?)
- Genus: †Australornis; Mayr & Scofield, 2014

Type species
- Australornis lovei Mayr & Scofield, 2014

Extinct genus of birds

Australornis (Latin: "southern bird") is a genus of extinct seabird like dinosaur discovered in New Zealand. It lived in the Paleocene epoch, 60.5 to 61.6 million years ago (Ma). The type species name originates from australis, Latin for "southern", and ornis, the Greek word for "bird", and lovei commemorates Leigh Love, an amateur paleontologist who discovered it.

Australornis is one of the oldest flying seabirds. It is also the first non-sphenisciform (penguins and allies) bird fossil discovered from New Zealand for that age. The fossil originates from an era just after the Cretaceous–Paleogene extinction event 66 million years ago. The features of the bird indicate that it does not belong to any of the extant bird families, but to a precursor group or clade which is extinct; hence it is a find of global significance with regard to the evolution of birds. Though the fossil evidence is incomplete to substantiate phylogeny, Australornis contributes to the emerging view that the diversification of Neoaves had already begun in the earliest Paleogene.

Australornis is also of zoogeographical significance, as New Zealand was much closer to Antarctica during the Late Cretaceous and Early Paleocene and it would have originated over deep waters of a warm sea off the coast of Zealandia, now a nearly submerged continent or microcontinent that sank after breaking away from Australia between 60 and 85 million years ago and on which New Zealand rests.

== Discovery ==
The fossil was discovered in 2009 by Leigh Love in the Paleocene Waipara Greensand of north Canterbury on the South Island of New Zealand.

The fossil was deposited in the Canterbury Museum, Christchurch, where it lay in museum shelves for a number of years, as earthquakes severely affected the working of the Museum staff. The fossil was described in 2014 by Dr Gerald Mayr, from the Senckenberg Research Institute and Natural History Museum in Frankfurt-am-Main, and Dr Paul Scofield of the Canterbury Museum, who published their findings in the Journal of the Royal Society of New Zealand.

== Description ==
Australornis grew roughly to about 70 to 85 centimetres (28 to 33 in) long, and has been likened to a pied shag in size. It is thought to have weighed between 1.5 to 2 kilograms (3.3 to 4.4 lb).

Australornis is known from the following remains:

- right coracoid (extremitas omalis)
- right scapula (caudal portion)
- right humerus (less the distal end)
- right ulna (proximal end only)
- fragments of the shaft of a radius
- left os carpi radiale

The wing and pectoral girdle bones of this avian fossil have been found to be quite distinct. While there is not enough fossil material from Australornis to enable a phylogenetic study linking it with extant bird groups, it has been found to share certain derived characteristics with a number of modern bird taxonomic groups, namely Procellariiformes, Gaviiformes and Rallidae.

Australornis lovei has similarities to two fossil avians from Antarctica - the similarly-sized Vegavis iaai (Noriega & Tambussi 1995) from the late Cretaceous (68 - 66 Ma) of Vega Island, Antarctica and Polarornis gregorii (Chatterjee 2002) from the Late Cretaceous López de Bertodano Formation of Seymour Island of Antarctica.

Though Australornis was found near the fossils of Waimanu manneringi, the oldest fossil penguin, found in the same level of strata in Waipara and regarded to be of the same age, it lacks any morphological resemblances to penguins. In 2017 a phylogenetic study Agnolín and colleagues have found Australornis to be stem-anseriforms along with Polarornis, Neogaeornis and Vegavis in the family Vegaviidae.
