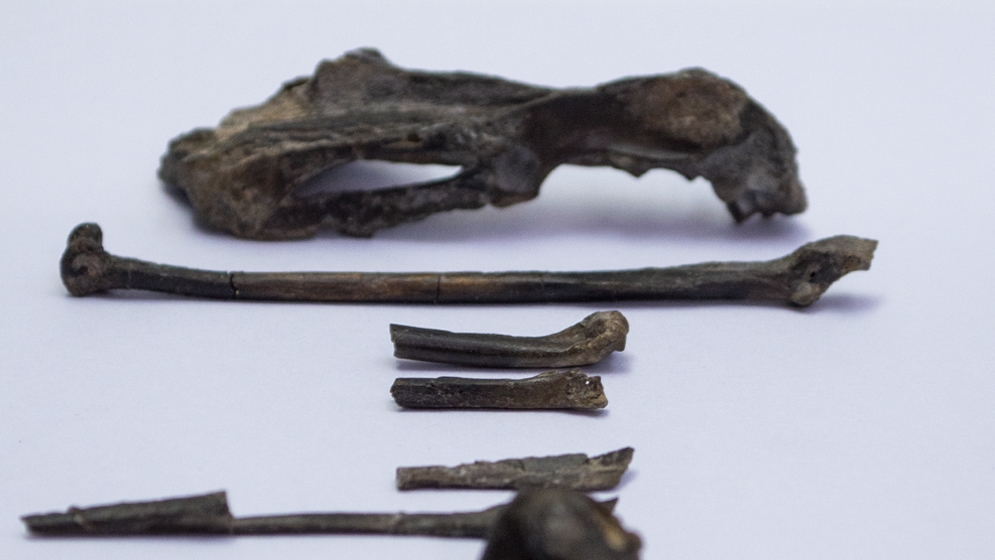
- Holotype of Pujatopouli soberana (MLP-PV 08-XI-30-44)

Scientific classification
- Kingdom: Animalia
- Phylum: Chordata
- Class: Aves
- Clade: Aequornithes
- Genus: †Pujatopouli; Irazoqui et al., 2026
- Species: †P. soberana

Binomial name
- †Pujatopouli soberana Irazoqui et al., 2026

= Pujatopouli =

Pujatopouli Temporal range: Late Cretaceous, Maastrichtian

Extinct genus of birds

Pujatopouli (lit. 'Pujato's bird') is an extinct genus of neoavian birds from the Late Cretaceous (Maastrichtian stage) López de Bertodano Formation of Marambio Island (Seymour Island), Antarctica. The genus contains a single species, Pujatopouli soberana, known from a partially preserved skull and several associated postcranial elements, representing one of the most complete Neornithes (crown group bird) from the Mesozoic era.

== Discovery and naming ==
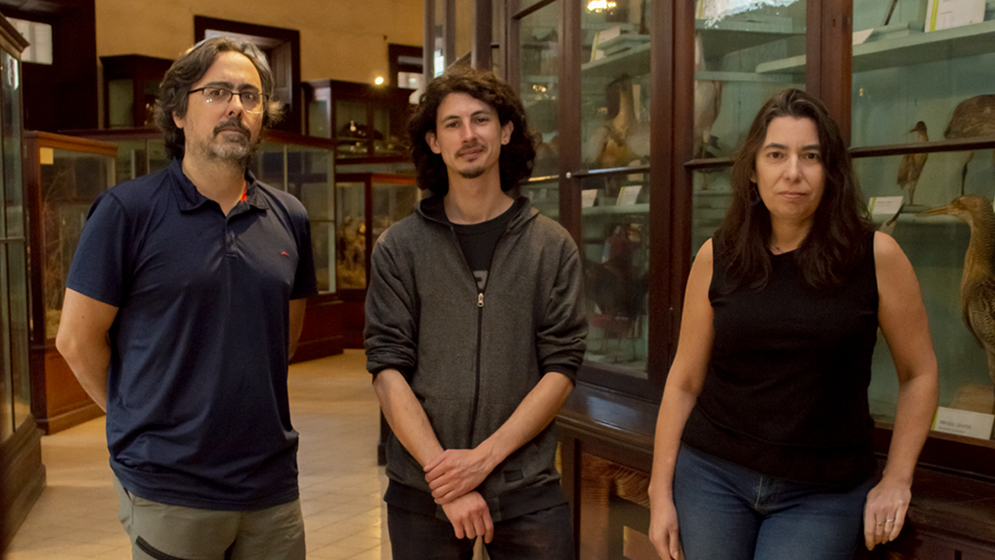
Facundo Irazoqui (center) with co-authors Javier Gelfo (left) and Carolina Acosta Hospitaleche (right)

The Pujatopouli holotype specimen, MLP-PV 08-XI-30-44, was discovered from the upper Molluscan Allomember of the López de Bertodano Formation, corresponding to the 9th cartographic unit identified from the Marambio Island. The specimen preserves the partial skull, four presacral thoracic vertebrae, distal (lower) end of the right humerus, proximal (upper) end of the left ulna, partial pelvis, synsacrum, left tibiotarsus, and sternum fragment. The cranium preserves a posterior portion, a partial beak and a nearly complete braincase, which is the first known among Mesozoic Neornithes.

In 2024, MLP-PV 08-XI-30-44 was preliminarily described by Carolina Acosta Hospitaleche and colleagues as an indeterminate neornithine bird. In 2026, Facundo Irazoqui and colleagues officially described Pujatopouli soberana based on the specimen. The generic name, Pujatopouli, is named in honour of Hernán Pujato, the founder of the Instituto Antártico Argentino and former Argentine military general and explorer, combining his last name with the Greek word πουλί (pouli, bird). The specific epithet, soberana, is named in honour of Patrulla Soberanía, the Argentine military group which founded the Marambio Base in 1969.

== Description ==
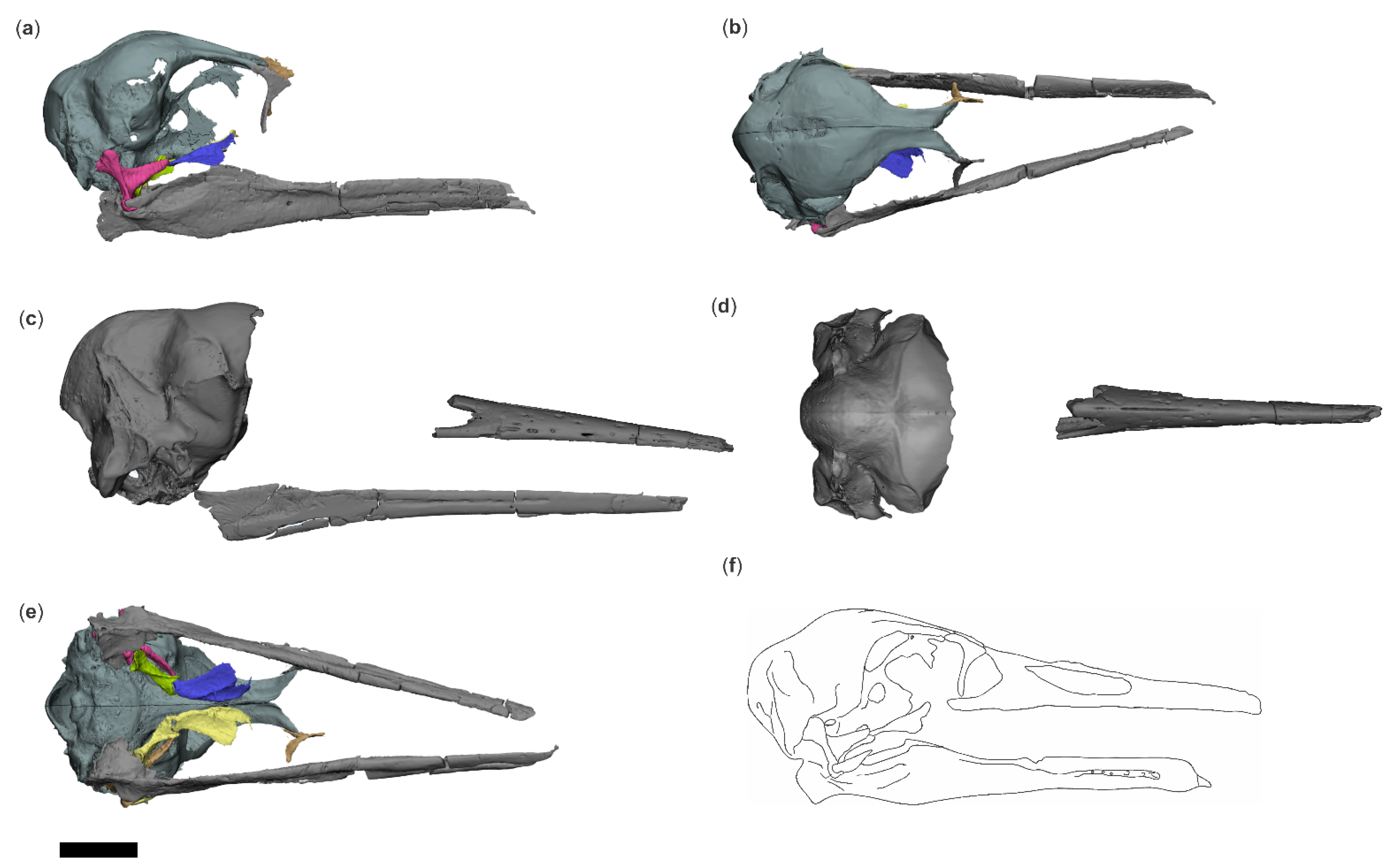
Virtual reconstruction of the skull of Pujatopouli (c, d), compared to Vegavis geitononesos (a, b, e, f)

Pujatopouli is smaller in body size than Polarornis from the same formation, weighing up to 2.03 kg (4.5 lb). The beak is long, narrow and straight with a pointed end, which is similar to that of the coexistent neornithine birds but different from the taller, rounded beaks of some early galloanserine birds like Asteriornis and Conflicto. The depth of the temporal fossa (a part of the skull associated with jaw muscles) is similar to that of the Prophaethontidae, an extinct family of seabirds related to modern tropicbirds. The shape of the proximal tibiotarsus indicates that Pujatopouli had laterally positioned hind limbs that can carry out underwater propulsion, which probably aided in hunting small invertebrates and fish in a similar way to that of modern foot-propelled diving birds.

== Classification ==
In their 2026 phylogenetic analysis, Irazoqui and colleagues recovered Pujatopouli as a member of the Neornithes based on two different datasets: the Mesozoic bird matrix and the Neornithes matrix. Analyses based on the latter suggest that Pujatopouli is a neoavian bird that belongs to the clade Aequornithes, specifically recovered as a sister taxon of the Procellaridae. The simplified version of these results are displayed in the cladogram below:

Topology 1: Mesozoic bird matrix.

- Neornithes
  - - Antarcticavis capelambensis
  - - - Conflicto antarcticus
      - Asteriornis maastrichtensis
    - - Anas platyrhynchos
      - - Polarornis gregorii
        - Pujatopouli soberana
        - Vegavis iaai
        - Gallus gallus

Topology 2: Neornithes matrix.

- Aequornithes
  - Gaviidae
  - - - Spheniscidae
      - - Pujatopouli soberana
        - Procellaridae
    - - - Ciconiidae
      - - - Phalacrocoracidae
          - Fregatidae
        - - Balaenicipitidae
          - - Ardeidae
            - Threskiornithidae

== Paleoenvironment ==
The upper Molluscan Allomember (unit klb 9) of the López de Bertodano Formation on Marambio Island, the type locality of Pujatopouli, is known to preserve a diverse fauna of marine reptiles including the large mosasaur Kaikaifilu, and the elasmosaurid plesiosaurs Aristonectes, Marambionectes, and Morturneria. Various indeterminate species of bony and cartilaginous fish genera have been recovered from this unit, with only a few being definitively identified to the specific level including Antarctiberyx seymouri and Xampylodon diastemacron. The other neornithine birds, Polarornis and Vegavis geitononesos, are also known from this unit. The only non-avian dinosaur fossil from this unit is represented by a single metatarsal of an indeterminate hadrosaurid.
