= John Zachary Young =

English zoologist and neurophysiologist

John Zachary Young FRS
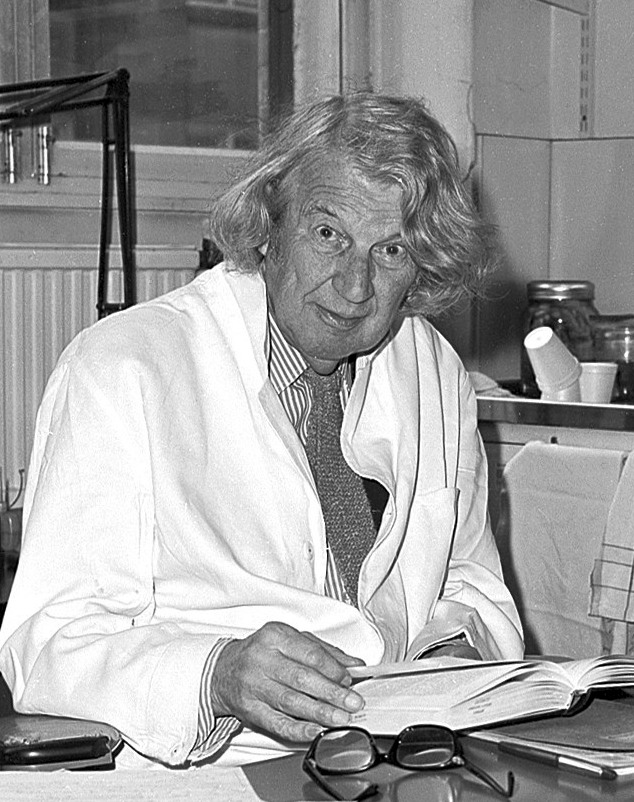
- John Zachary Young in 1978
- Born: 18 March 1907; Bristol, England
- Died: 4 July 1997 (aged 90); Oxford, England
- Education: Magdalen College, University of Oxford
- Known for: Research on the giant axon of the squid
- Scientific career
- Fields: Zoology, anatomy, physiology
- Workplaces: University College London, University of Oxford

John Zachary Young (18 March 1907 – 4 July 1997), generally known as "JZ" or "JZY", was an English zoologist and neurophysiologist, described as "one of the most influential biologists of the 20th century".

== Biography ==
Young went to school at Marlborough College. In 1928, he received a first class honours degree in zoology from Magdalen College, Oxford. On October 12, 1942, he spoke at the Socratic Club in Oxford on the topic "Purpose and Design in Nature" as part of the series of talks and debates led by C. S. Lewis. He was elected a fellow of the Royal Society in 1945 and served as professor of Anatomy at University College London from then until 1974. The following year, he became a professor emeritus and proposed a degree programme in the Human Sciences.

Young was elected to the American Academy of Arts and Sciences in 1957. Among his honors are a Linnean Medal for zoology from the Linnean Society of London, awarded in 1973. He was elected to the American Philosophical Society in 1973. He was awarded an honorary degree (Doctor of Science) by the University of Bath in 1974. The chair of the Anatomy Department at University College London is named the J. Z. Young Chair in his honour. For many years, Young spent the summer experimenting season at the Stazione Zoologica in Naples. In 1991, the city awarded him honorary citizenship, and the president of the Stazione Zoologica awarded him its gold medal. That year he was also invited by the Italian Society of Experimental Biology (Società Italiana di Biologia Sperimentale) to give an anniversary lecture, as the society's oldest living member; for this lecture, Young picked the same subject he had talked about 63 years earlier, in 1928.

In 1981, Young became a founding member of the World Cultural Council.

Young revered the brother of his great-great-grandfather, Richard, the English scientist and Egyptologist Thomas Young, M.D., F.R.S. (1773–1829).

== Research work ==
Most of Young's scientific research was on the nervous system. He discovered the squid giant axon and the corresponding squid giant synapse. His work in the 1930s on signal transmission in, and the fiber structure of, nerves inspired the work of Sir Andrew Huxley and Sir Alan Hodgkin for which they received a Nobel Prize.

During World War II, responding to the large number of nerve injuries sustained by soldiers in combat and drawing on his work in comparative anatomy and the regrowth of damaged nerves in squids and octopuses, Young set up a unit at the University of Oxford to study nerve regeneration in mammals. His team investigated the biochemical conditions which control nerve fiber growth and also sought ways to accelerate the repair of peripheral nerves severed by injury. Working with Peter Medawar, Young found a way to rejoin small peripheral nerves using a "glue" of plasma. This method was eventually modified and used in surgery.

After WWII, Young's research interests turned to investigating the central nervous system and the functions of the brain. He discussed and corresponded with the mathematician Alan Turing on brain cells, memory, pattern recognition, and embryology, from 1949.

In 1950, Young was invited by the BBC to deliver the Reith Lectures. In his series of eight radio broadcasts, titled Doubt and Certainty in Science, he introduced the BBC audience to the themes of his research, exploring the function of the brain and the then-current scientific methods used to increase understanding of it.

In 1971, Young was named an honorary member of the American Association for Anatomy.

Young is probably best remembered for his two textbooks, The Life of Vertebrates and The Life of Mammals. He was president of the Marine Biological Association (MBA) from 1976 to 1986. His personal research library is held in the National Marine Biological Library at the MBA.

== Personal life ==
Young was born in Mangotsfield near Bristol. After moving to London to take up his position at University College London, he lived first in Chelsea, then moved to Camden Town in 1962. After his retirement in 1974, he gradually moved from London to an old brick kiln house in Brill in Buckinghamshire. For most of his retirement, he continued to work both at the Stazione Zoologica in Naples and at a laboratory in the Psychology Department of Oxford University, and to publish scientific papers.

Young married twice, to Phyllis Heaney (a painter) with whom he had two children, Simon Zachary and Cordelia, and in 1987, following her death, to Raymonde Parsons (also an artist) with whom he had one child, Kate Frances.

== Collections ==
Young's archive was deposited at University College London between 1985 and 1998. The collection contains papers relating to his research and teaching, personal and professional correspondence, and material relating to publications.

== Publications ==
- The Life of Vertebrates. 1st ed 767pp 1950 (corrected 1952 repr); 2nd ed 820pp 1962; 3rd ed 645pp 1981
- Doubt and Certainty in Science, 1950 BBC Reith Lectures.
- Doubt and Certainty in Science, 1951
- The Life of Mammals. 1st ed 820pp 1957; 2nd ed 528pp 1975
- Taxonomy of the vertebrates
- A Model of the Brain, 1964
- The Memory System of the Brain, 1966
- An Introduction to the Study of Man, 1971
- The Anatomy of the Nervous System of Octopus vulgaris, 1971
- Programs of the Brain, 1978 (1975–77 Gifford Lectures, online)
- Philosophy and the Brain, 1987
- Many scientific papers, mostly on the nervous system.
- The Brains and Lives of Cephalopods, by Marion Nixon and the late John Z. Young, 2003, Reprinted 2011

== Bibliography ==
- Who's Who (UK)
- Obituary, The Times; 9 July 1997; p. 21
- Obituary, The Independent; 8 July 1997; p. 14

Academic offices
Preceded by Harold Munro Fox	Fullerian Professor of Physiology; 1957–1961	Succeeded by Richard John Harrison
