= The Life of Vertebrates =

1950 textbook by John Zachary Young

- First edition
- Author: John Zachary Young
- Language: English
- Subject: Vertebrates
- Publisher: Oxford : Clarendon
- Publication date: 1950
- Publication place: United Kingdom
- Media type: Print

The Life of Vertebrates is a 1950 biology textbook by John Zachary Young.

The book grew out of the author's attempt to define what is meant by the life of vertebrates and by the evolution of that life. It combined an account of the embryology, anatomy, physiology, biochemistry, palaeontology, and ecology of all vertebrates and, the author argued, he has attempted via a documentation of the "central fact of biology, that life goes on", and to combine the results of the studies of these into a single work in which this continuity is maintained. It has been listed as the Book of A Lifetime by Colin Tudge who argues that the book might help humanity recover its humility and reverence in the face of nature rather than simply inspiring "awe".

== See also ==
- Taxonomy of the vertebrates (Young, 1962)
