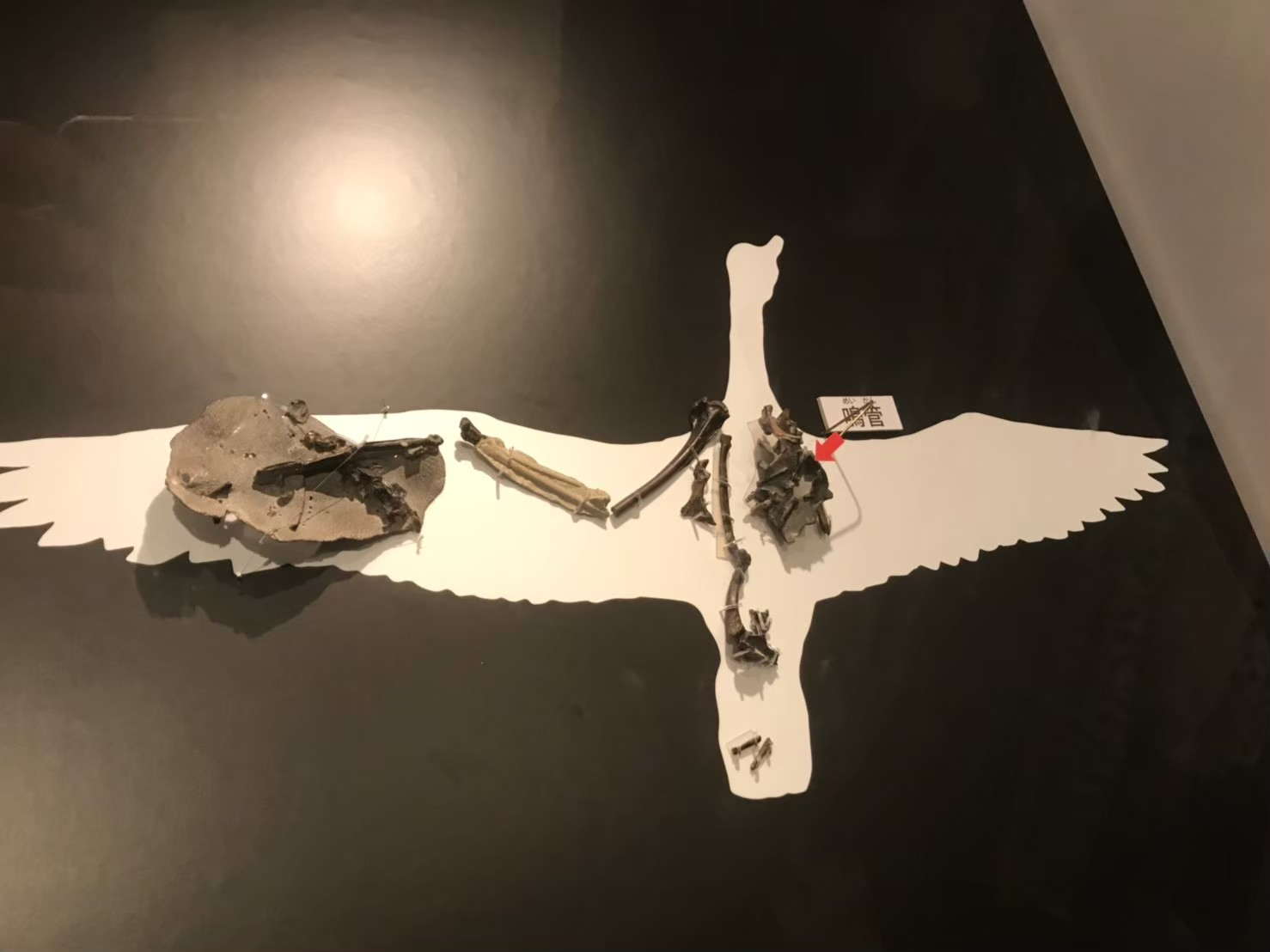
- V. iaai fossils displayed in Japan

Scientific classification
- Kingdom: Animalia
- Phylum: Chordata
- Class: Aves
- Infraclass: Neognathae
- Order: incertae sedis
- Family: †Vegaviidae
- Genus: †Vegavis; Clarke et al., 2005

Type species
- †Vegavis iaai Clarke et al., 2005

Other species
- †Vegavis geitononesos Irazoqui et al., 2026; †Vegavis notopothousa Irazoqui et al., 2026

= Vegavis =

Vegavis Temporal range: Late Cretaceous, Maastrichtian

Extinct genus of birds

Vegavis is a genus of extinct avian dinosaur that lived in Antarctica during the Maastrichtian stage of the Late Cretaceous. The type species is Vegavis iaai, named in 2005 based on fossils from the López de Bertodano Formation. Two additional species, Vegavis geitononesos and Vegavis notopothousa, were named in 2026 based on additional material from the same formation. Vegavis potentially represents one of the earliest known crown group birds. The definitive taxonomic position of Vegavis has been a subject of debate among paleontologists for over two decades since its initial description as a member of Anseriformes within Galloanserae.

== Taxonomy ==
Rotating virtual reconstruction of the skull of V. geitononesos

The genus name, Vegavis, is a combination of the name of Vega Island and "avis", the Latin word for bird, while the species name, "iaai", is after the acronym for Instituto Antartico Argentino (IAA), the Argentine scientific expedition to Antarctica. The holotype is held by the Museo de La Plata, Argentina. The specimen, cataloged as MLP 93-I-3-1, was found in 1993 from the López de Bertodano Formation at Cape Lamb on Vega Island, Antarctica, and was first thought to be an indeterminate presbyornithid. It was only described as a new species in 2005, because it consists of the very delicate remains of one bird embedded in a concretion, which had to be meticulously prepared for study. CT scans were utilized to gain a clearer picture of the bone structure without running danger of damaging or destroying the fossil.

A second specimen, MACN-PV 19.748 (formerly MLP 93-I-3-2), was found beside the holotype specimen. It was preserved in three dimensions, so CT scans were again utilized to visualize the intact syrinx of this specimen. The syrinx has an asymmetrical third segment, suggesting that Vegavis had two sources of sound in the neck and along with large soft-tissue resonating structures. This indicates that it was likely capable of honks as in ducks, geese, and other basal neognaths. Other potential specimens have also been reported, including a distal tarsometatarsus (AMNH FARB 30913) tentatively identified as cf. Vegavis, an isolated femur (SDSM 78247) referred to as Vegavis sp., and a synsacrum (MN 7832-V) referred to as cf. V. iaai.

Two decades after the formal naming of Vegavis, a nearly complete skull specimen (AMNH FARB 30899) discovered by Eric M. Roberts in 2011 from the Sandwich Bluff Member of the López de Bertodano Formation on Vega Island was officially described in 2025. The authors argued that the morphology of this skull supports the placement of Vegavis within crown-group Aves, specifically as a member of the Anseriformes, and provides novel insight into its feeding ecology. In 2026, Irazoqui and colleagues described this specimen as the holotype of a new species of Vegavis, named V. notopothousa. The specific name combines the Greek words nótos, meaning 'south' and póthos, referring to 'longing', alluding to the discovery of the holotype in the Southern Hemisphere but now housed in the Northern Hemisphere. The authors also named V. geitononesos, a third species in the genus, based on another partial skull and skeleton (MLP-PV 15-I-7-52). The specific name combines the Greek geítōn, meaning 'neighbor' and nêsos, meaning 'island', referencing the discovery of this species on Marambio Island, whereas V. iaai was found on the nearby Vega Island.

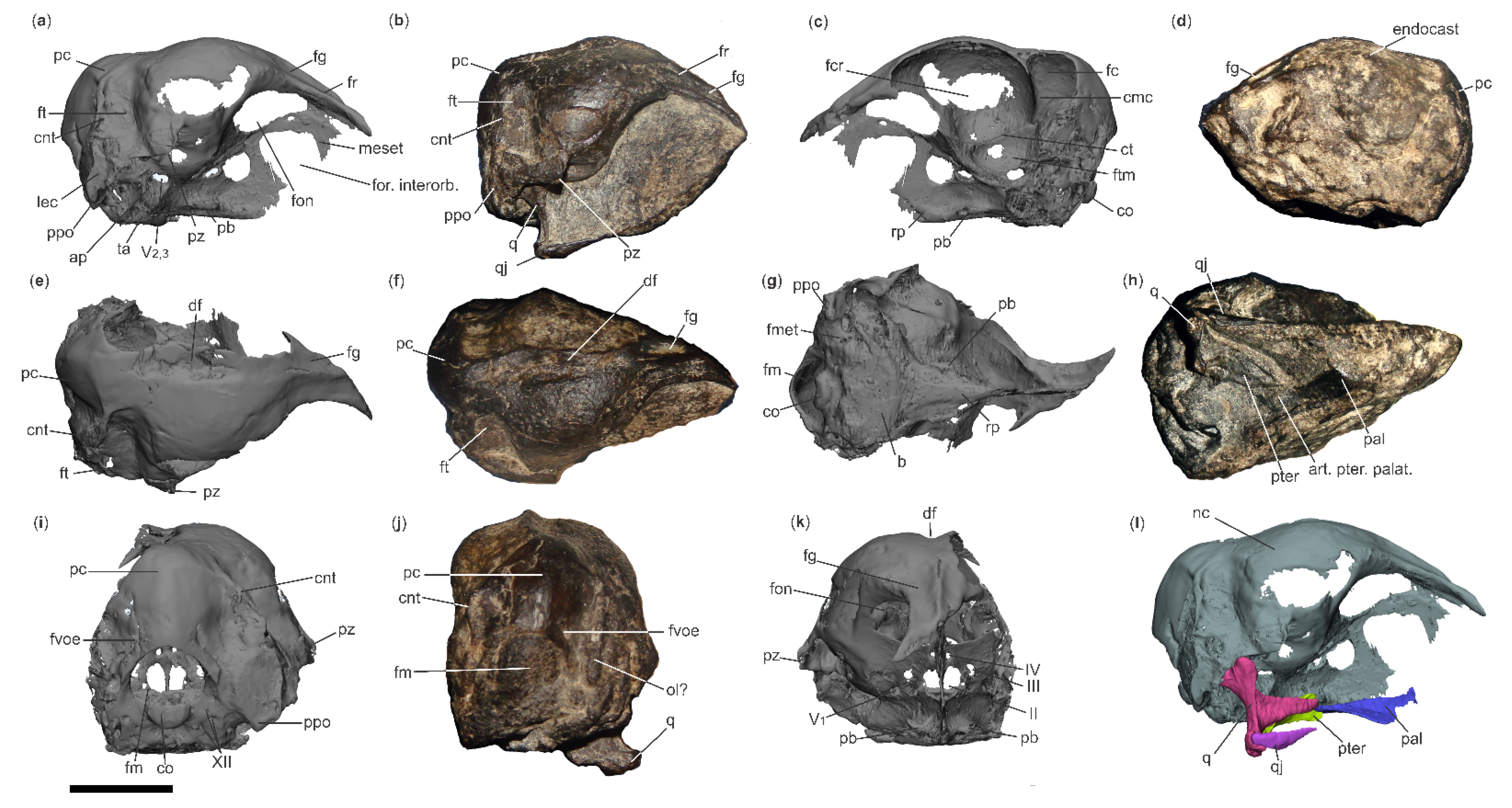
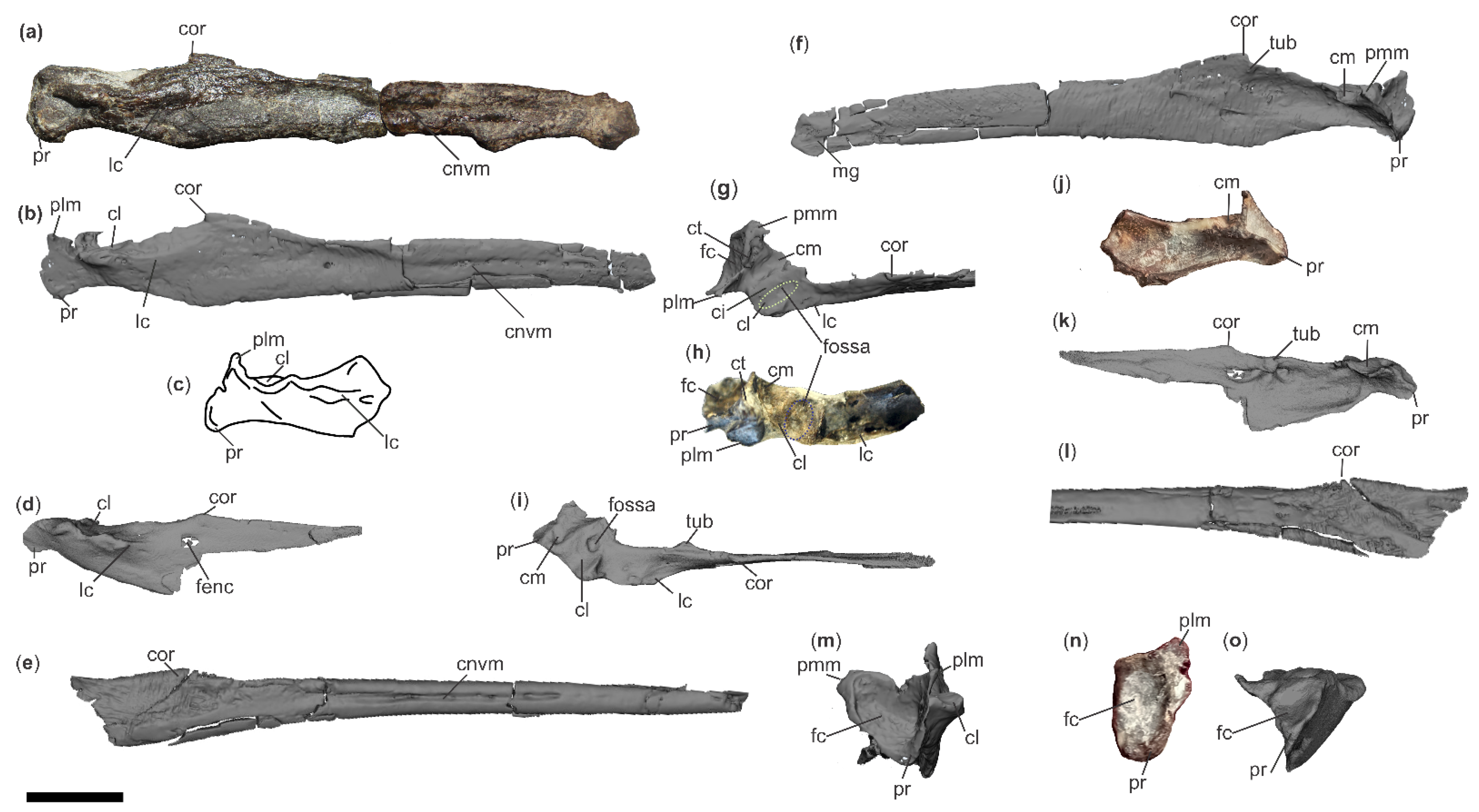
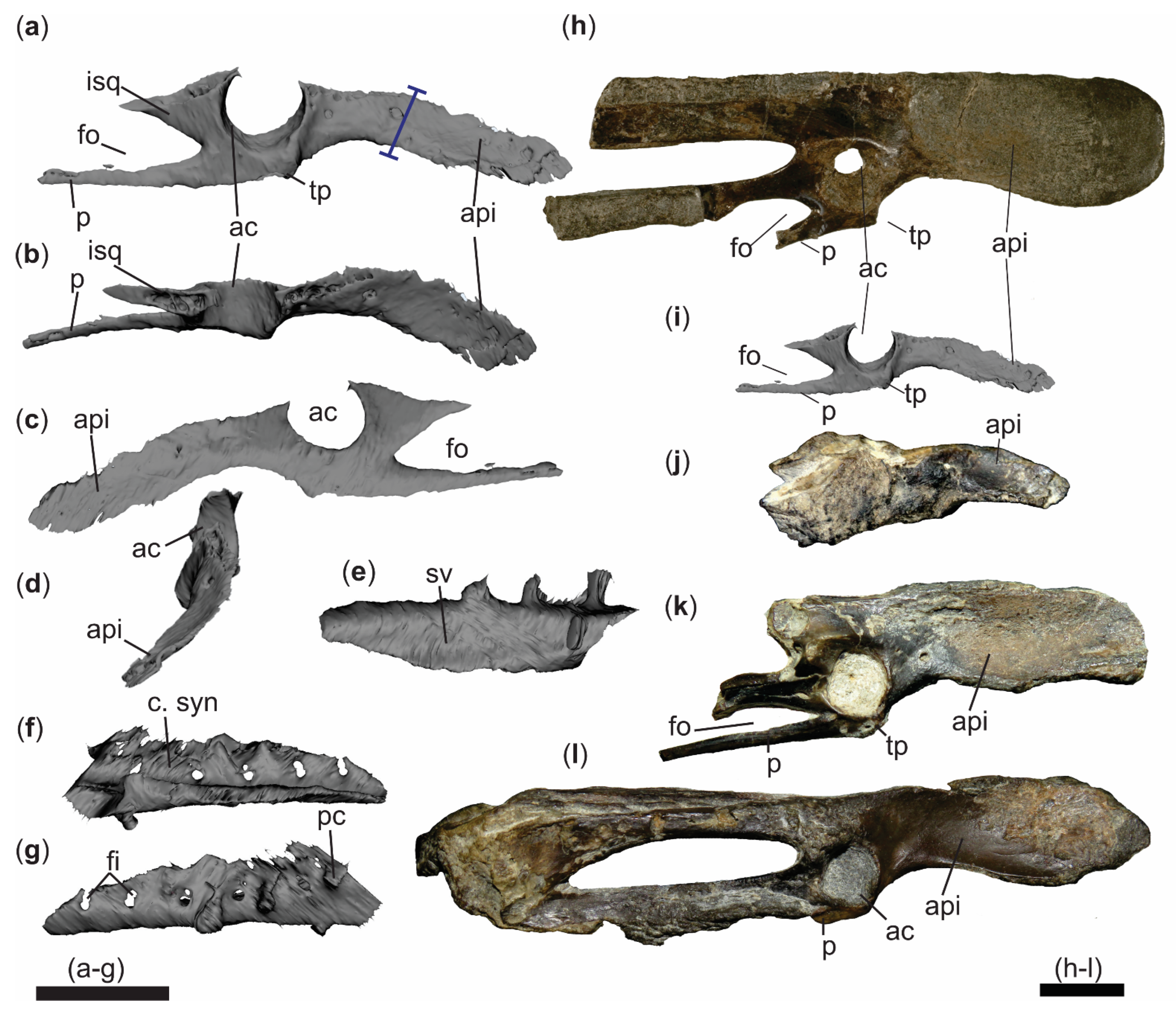
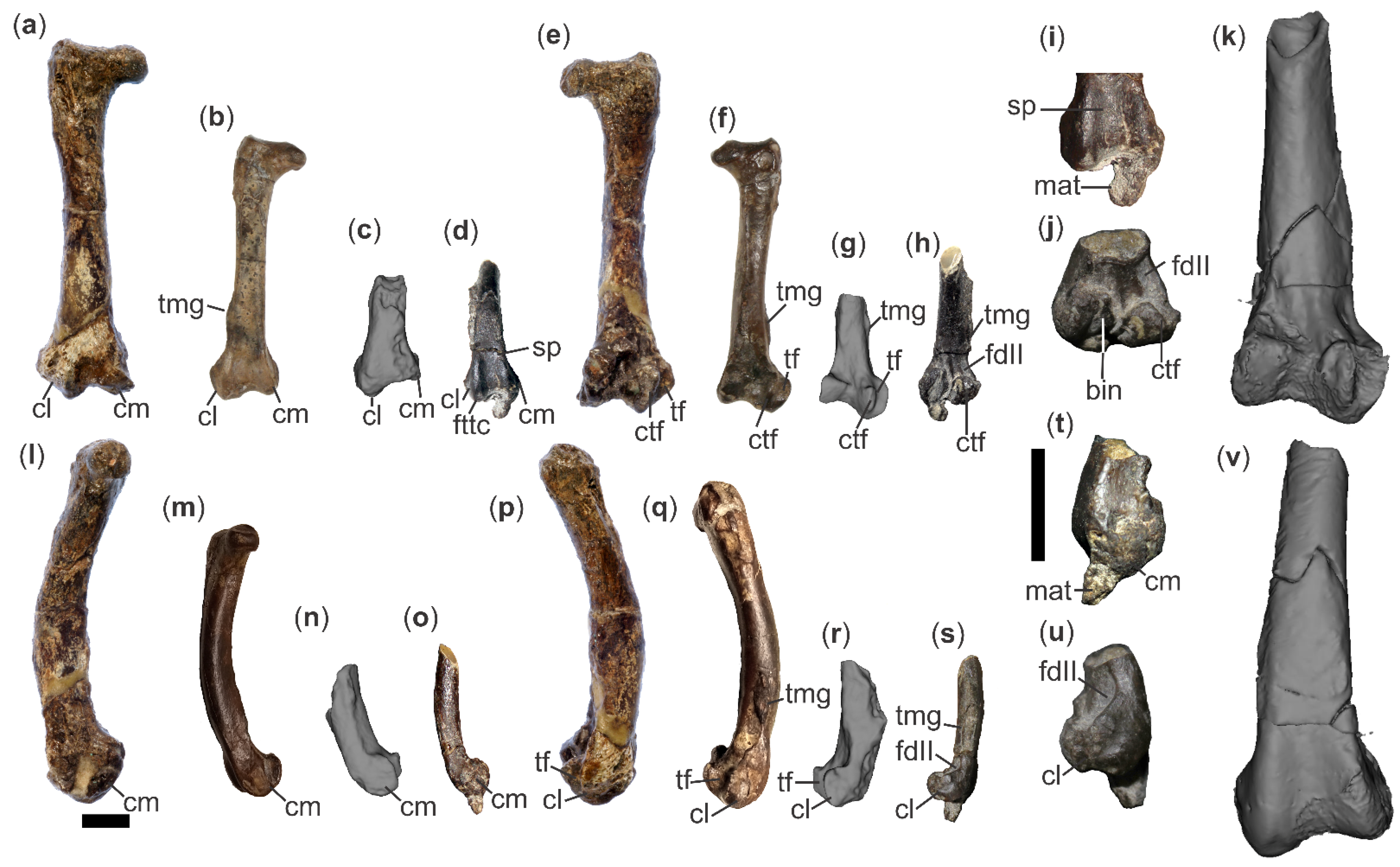
Fossils of Cretaceous Antarctic birds: Holotype skull of V. geitononesos (top left), mandibles of all three Vegavis species and Pujatopouli (top right), hip and sacral bones of V. geitononesos, V. iaai, and Pujatopouli (bottom left), and femora of Polarornis, V. iaai, and V. geitononesos (bottom right)

== Classification ==
Vegavis was initially described as a member of the crown group Anseriformes within Galloanserae, indicating that some representatives of the modern bird groups lived in the Mesozoic.

However, some paleontologists questioned its affinities to Anseriformes or Galloanserae, with some classifying it as a stem-group bird within Ornithurae, a crown group bird outside Galloanserae, a sister taxon of the Neornithes or at the base of Neognathae with an unresolved position. In contrast, Vegavis was recovered as a sister taxon of Anatidae or Anseriformes within Galloanserae based on other phylogenetic analyses. In a 2025 study which assigned AMNH FARB 30899 to Vegavis, Torres et al. supported its placement within crown group Anseriformes, sister to Conflicto and Anas, based on their revised phylogenetic analyses. In the same year, Crane et al. also recovered Vegavis within Anseriformes based on their phylogenetic analyses, albeit with weak support, and questioned whether the mandible morphology of AMNH FARB 30899 supports the placement of Vegavis within Galloanserae or even Neornithes. In 2026, Irazoqui et al. suggested that Vegavis can only be confidently placed as a neognath of uncertain affinities.

Agnolín et al. (2017) proposed the family Vegaviidae as stem-group Anseriformes containing Vegavis, Polarornis and several other extinct avian genera, but the monophyly of this clade was questioned by subsequent studies. The fragmentary Polarornis might possibly belong to this clade, but the reported specimens are poorly preserved to resolve its taxonomic affinities. Worthy et al. (2017) also proposed the order "Vegaviiformes" to include Vegaviidae, but this is a disused clade that has never been mentioned by other researchers except for the describers of Conflicto antarcticus.

== Paleobiology ==
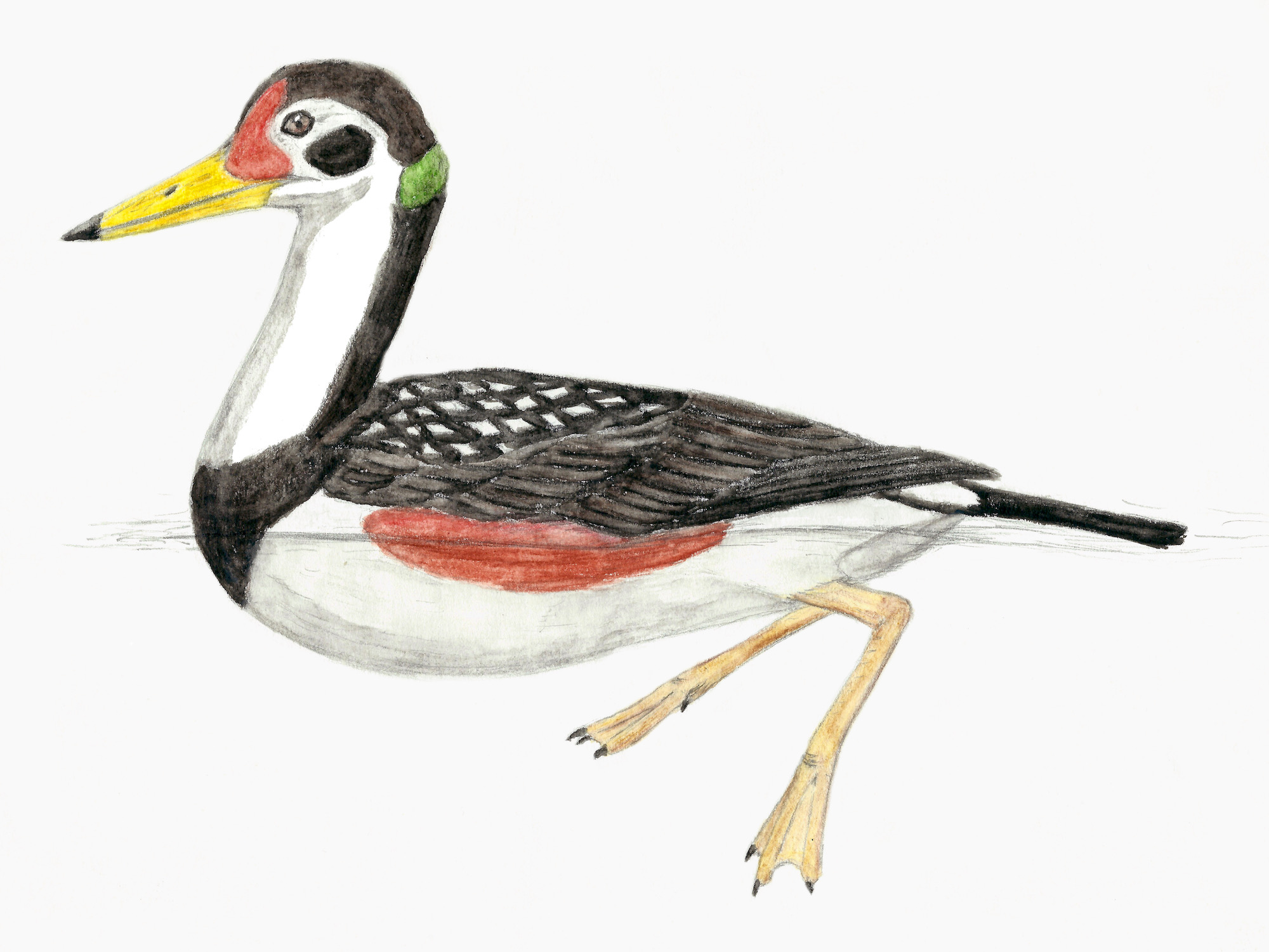
Speculative life restoration based on Agnolín et al. (2017)

Vegavis was a bird with a high metabolism, which allowed it to live at high latitudes in Antarctica. It also shows a degree of osteosclerosis, a condition shared with Polarornis. This different degrees of osteosclerosis could be related to variations in diving behaviour.

== Paleoenvironment ==
The Sandwich Bluff Member (unit klb 1) of the Lopez de Bertodano Formation on Vega Island, the type locality of V. iaai and V. notopothousa, is dated to the middle Maastrichtian, approximately 69.2 to 68.4 million years ago. Indeterminate non-avian dinosaur fossils have been discovered from this unit, including the remains of hadrosaurids, elasmarians, parankylosaurians and megaraptorans.

The upper Molluscan Allomember (unit klb 9) of the Lopez de Bertodano Formation on Seymour (Marambio) Island, the type locality of V. geitononesos, is dated to the uppermost Maastrichtian. It is known to preserve a diverse fauna of marine reptiles including the large mosasaur Kaikaifilu, and the elasmosaurid plesiosaurs Aristonectes, Marambionectes, and Morturneria. Various indeterminate species of bony and cartilaginous fish genera have been recovered from this unit, with only a few being definitively identified to the specific level including Antarctiberyx seymouri and Xampylodon diastemacron. The other neornithine birds, Polarornis and Pujatopouli, are also known from this unit. The only non-avian dinosaur fossil from this unit is represented by a single metatarsal of an indeterminate hadrosaurid.

== See also ==
- Asteriornis
