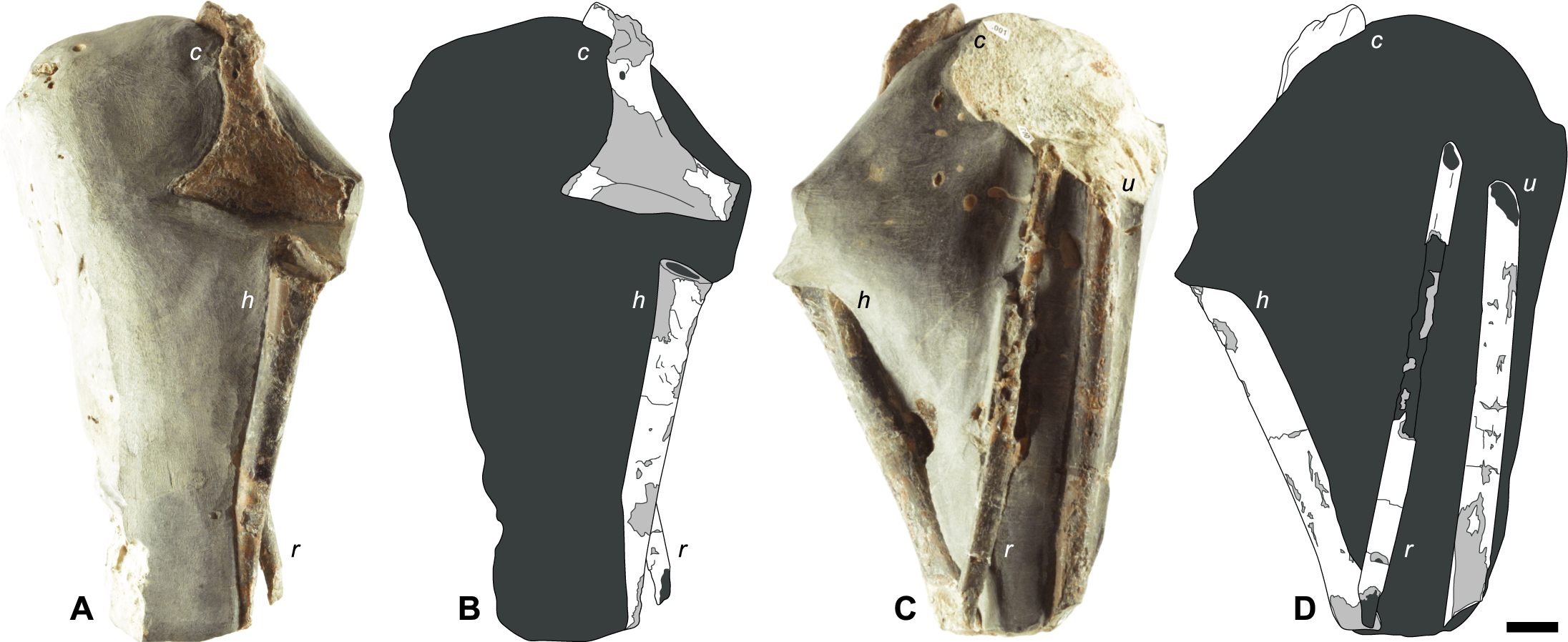
- Holotype Fossil

Scientific classification
- Kingdom: Animalia
- Phylum: Chordata
- Class: Aves
- Order: Anseriformes
- Family: †Vegaviidae (?)
- Genus: †Maaqwi; McLachpan, Kaiser, & Longrich, 2017
- Species: †M. cascadensis

Binomial name
- †Maaqwi cascadensis McLachlan, Kaiser, & Longrich, 2017

= Maaqwi =

Maaqwi Temporal range: Campanian

Extinct genus of dinosaurs

Maaqwi is an extinct genus of large marine diving bird from the Late Cretaceous (Northumberland Formation, latest Campanian) of Hornby Island, British Columbia, Canada. The genus name Maaqwi comes from the Coast Salish "ma'aqwi" meaning "water bird," and the specific epithet cascadensis reflects the fossil's origin from the Cascadia region of Western North America. The genus is known from a single specimen, RBCM.EH2008.011.01120. It consists of a coracoid, humerus, ulna, and radius in a nodule of mudstone. The specimen is housed in the Royal British Columbia Museum. Maaqwi had an estimated body mass of 1.5 kg (3.3 lb). It was described as a vegaviid, although the German paleontologist Gerald Mayr suggested that the coracoid more closely resembles that of the Procellariiformes. While some studies continue to treat it as a vegaviid, others note that the phylogenetic analyses by McLachlan, Kaiser and Longrich (2017) are more appropriate to analyze stem birds than neornithines.
