= Colymboides =

Colymboides Temporal range: 37–20 Ma

Scientific classification
- Kingdom: Animalia
- Phylum: Chordata
- Class: Aves
- Order: Gaviiformes
- Family: †Colymboididae; Brodkorb, 1963
- Subfamily: †Colymboidinae; Brodkorb, 1963
- Genus: †Colymboides; Milne-Edwards, 1867

Species
- †C. minutus Milne-Edwards, 1867 †C. anglicus Lydekker, 1891 †C. metzleri Mayr, 2004

Synonyms
- Gavioides

Genus of birds

The genus Colymboides contains three species of early loon dating from the late Oligocene or early Miocene. They are considered to be the earliest known unambiguous gaviiform fossils. The genus is widely known from early Priabonian – about 37 million years ago in the Late Eocene – to Early Miocene (late Burdigalian, less than 20 million years ago) limnic and marine rocks of western Eurasia north of the Alpide belt, between the Atlantic and the former Turgai Sea. It is usually placed in the Gaviidae already, but usually (Note: Some (notably Robert W. Storer) have disagreed, usually because they separated Gaviella in the basalmost subfamily of the Gaviidae and considered Colymboides the ancestor of Gavia. More recent authors generally disagree at least regarding the latter: Storer (1956), Olson (1985), Mayr (2009)) in a subfamily Colymboidinae, with the modern-type loons making up the Gaviinae. But the Colymboides material is generally quite distinct from modern loons, and may actually belong in a now-extinct family of primitive gaviiforms. The best studied species, Colymboides minutus, was described by Robert Storer as being much smaller than modern loons and not as well adapted to diving.
