= Polarornis =

Polarornis Temporal range: Maastrichtian ~66 Ma

Scientific classification
- Kingdom: Animalia
- Phylum: Chordata
- Class: Aves
- Order: incertae sedis
- Family: †Vegaviidae (?)
- Genus: †Polarornis; Chatterjee, 2002
- Species: †P. gregorii

Binomial name
- †Polarornis gregorii Chatterjee, 2002

Extinct genus of birds

Polarornis is a genus of prehistoric bird like dinosaur, either a possible member of the Vegaviidae or Aequornithes. It contains a single species Polarornis gregorii, known from incomplete remains of one individual found on Seymour Island, Antarctica, in rocks which are dated to the Late Cretaceous (López de Bertodano Formation, about 66 Ma).

The discovery of Polarornis gregorii was first announced by Sankar Chatterjee in 1989, but he did not describe and officially name the species until 2002. The name Polarornis had been announced unofficially several years prior to its official publication, in Chatterjee's 1997 book The Rise of Birds. It was about the size of a common loon, with an estimated body length of 60 cm (2.0 ft) and weighing up to 2.8–4 kg (6.2–8.8 lb).

== Classification ==
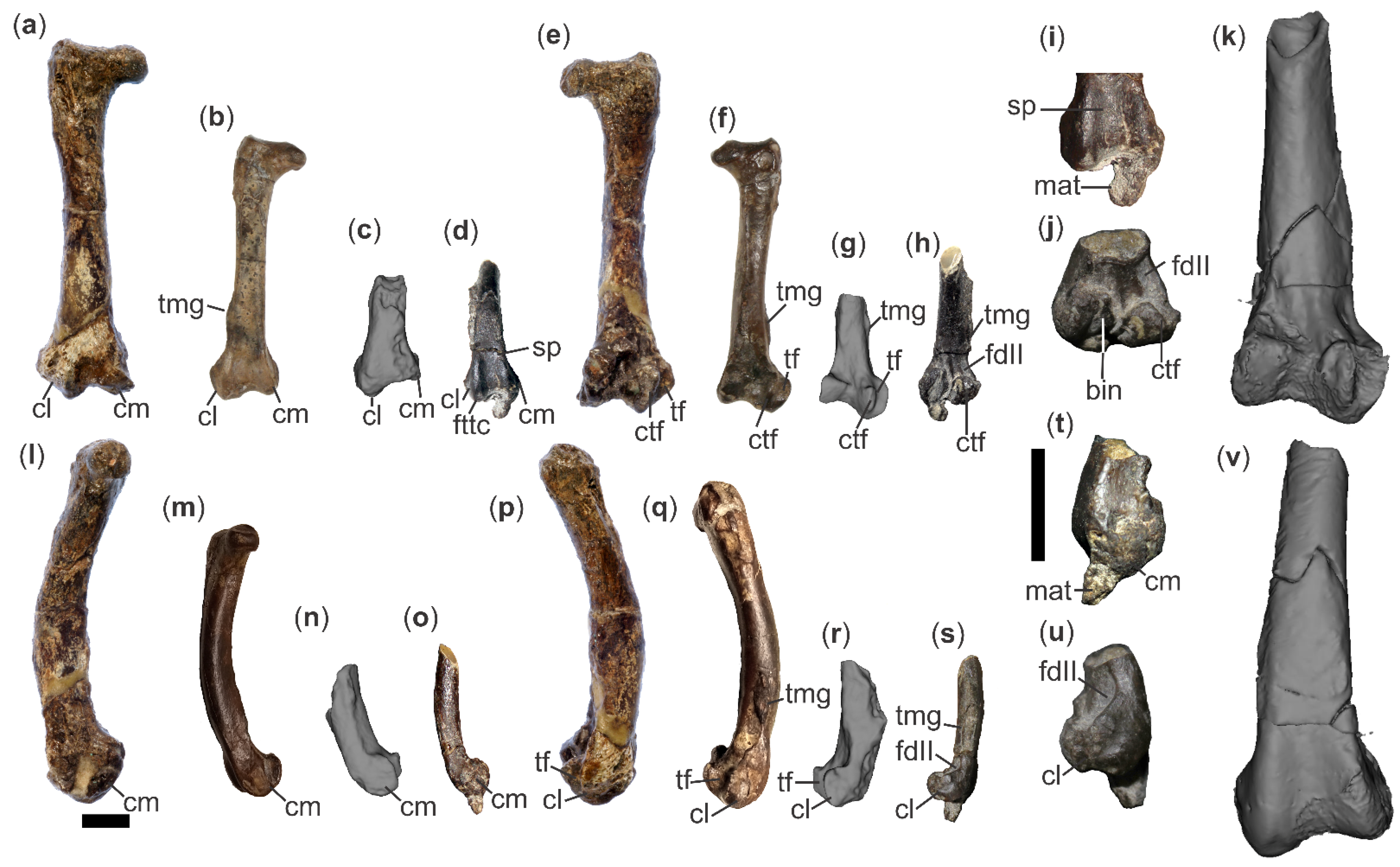
Femur of Polarornis (a, e, l, p) compared to Vegavis iaai and V. geitononesos

The relationships of this species are unclear. It is often claimed to be an ancestor of modern loons (divers), but some scientists have questioned this. Gerald Mayr, for example, noted that Polarornis differed from loons in some important characteristics, and criticized Chatterjee's original description of the fossils for overstating the specimen's completeness. Before the official description of the species, Alan Feduccia published an opinions casting doubt on its identification as a loon. However, other Mesozoic bird specialists, including Storrs Olson and Sylvia Hope, have supported the classification of Polarornis as an early member of the loon lineage.

Some recent studies seem to vindicate its status as a stem-loon; alongside Neogaeornis and some unnamed Antarctic specimens, it seems to suggest a Gondwanan origin for this clade, possibly displaced northwards by early penguins. However, in 2017, a phylogenetic study, Agnolín and colleagues have found Neogaeornis and Polarornis to be stem-anseriforms along with Australornis and Vegavis in the family Vegaviidae. In their 2025 description of Pujatopouli, Irazoqui and colleagues recovered Polarornis as a member of the Aequornithes based on the Neornithes dataset, with one analysis grouping it with Gaviidae.

== Paleobiology ==
Polarornis was in all likelihood aquatic and fed on fish and large invertebrates, probably being an ecological equivalent of loons, grebes, or the Cretaceous Hesperornithes of the Northern Hemisphere. One analysis of the structure of the femur (TTU P 9265) showed that the bones were dense, rather than hollow and lightweight as in flying birds, suggesting that Polarornis was a flightless or near-flightless diving bird similar to hesperornithines and penguins.

== See also ==
- Geology of Antarctica
  - List of fossiliferous stratigraphic units in Antarctica
- South Polar region of the Cretaceous
