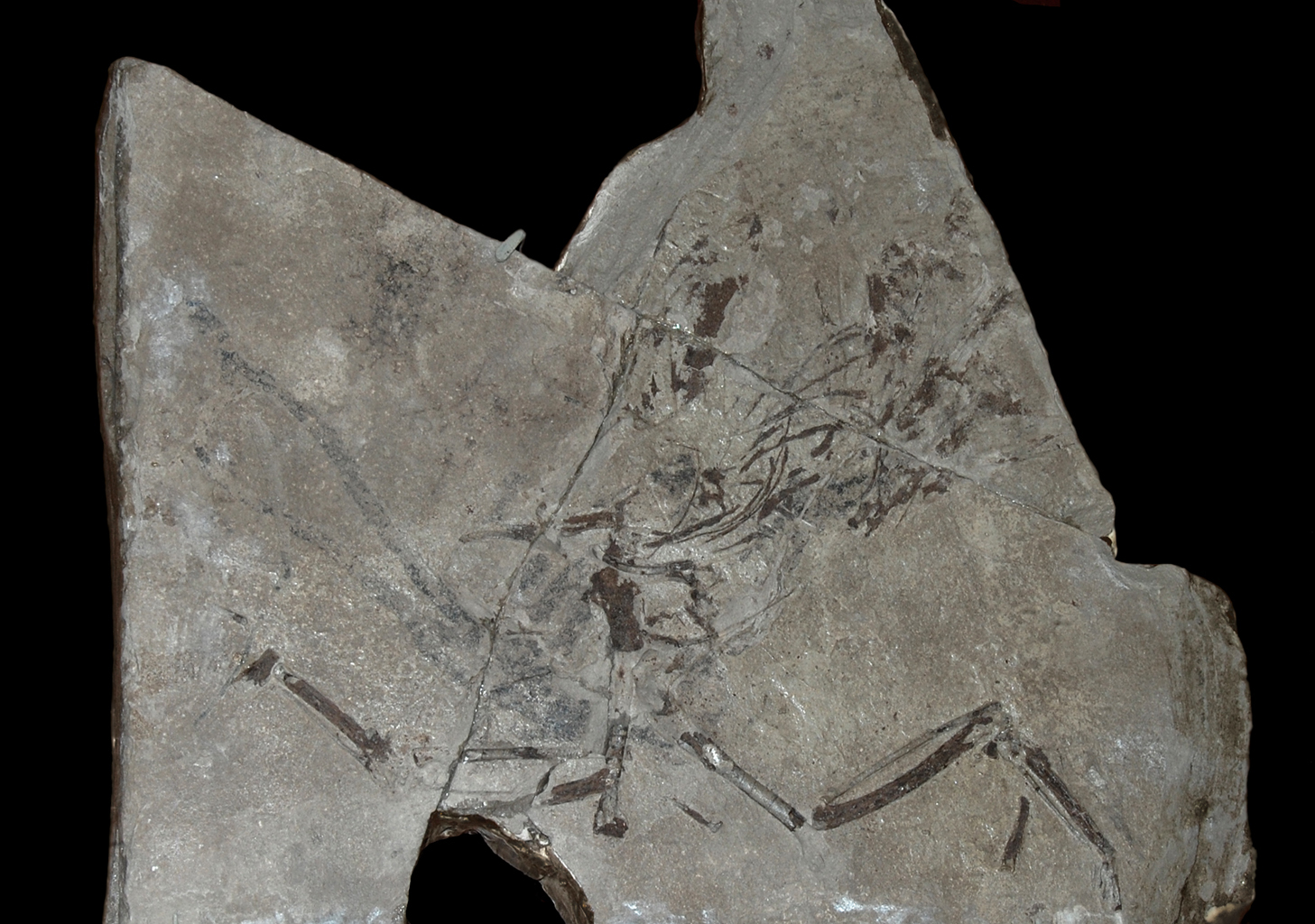
- Holotype specimen

Scientific classification
- Kingdom: Animalia
- Phylum: Chordata
- Class: Aves
- Order: Gaviiformes
- Family: Gaviidae
- Subfamily: †Petralcinae; Mlíkovský & Kovar, 1987
- Genus: †Petralca; Mlíkovský & Kovar, 1987

Type species
- †Petralca austriaca Mlíkovský, 1987

= Petralca =

Petralca Temporal range: Oligocene - Miocene, 23.03–20.43 Ma

Extinct genus of birds

Petralca is an extinct genus of loon found in Oligocene and Miocene deposits of Austria. The type and only species, Petralca austriaca, was described in 1987. It is the only member of the Petralcinae subfamily. Originally thought to be the oldest representative of auk in Europe, it was reinterpreted as a member of Gaviiformes by Göhlich & Mayr (2018).
