= Colymbiformes =

Former order of birds

Colymbiformes is a disused order of birds that was once used to classify grebes and loons. Scientific study has revealed that these two types of waterbirds are not so closely related; they have been reclassified in the orders Podicipediformes and Gaviiformes, respectively.

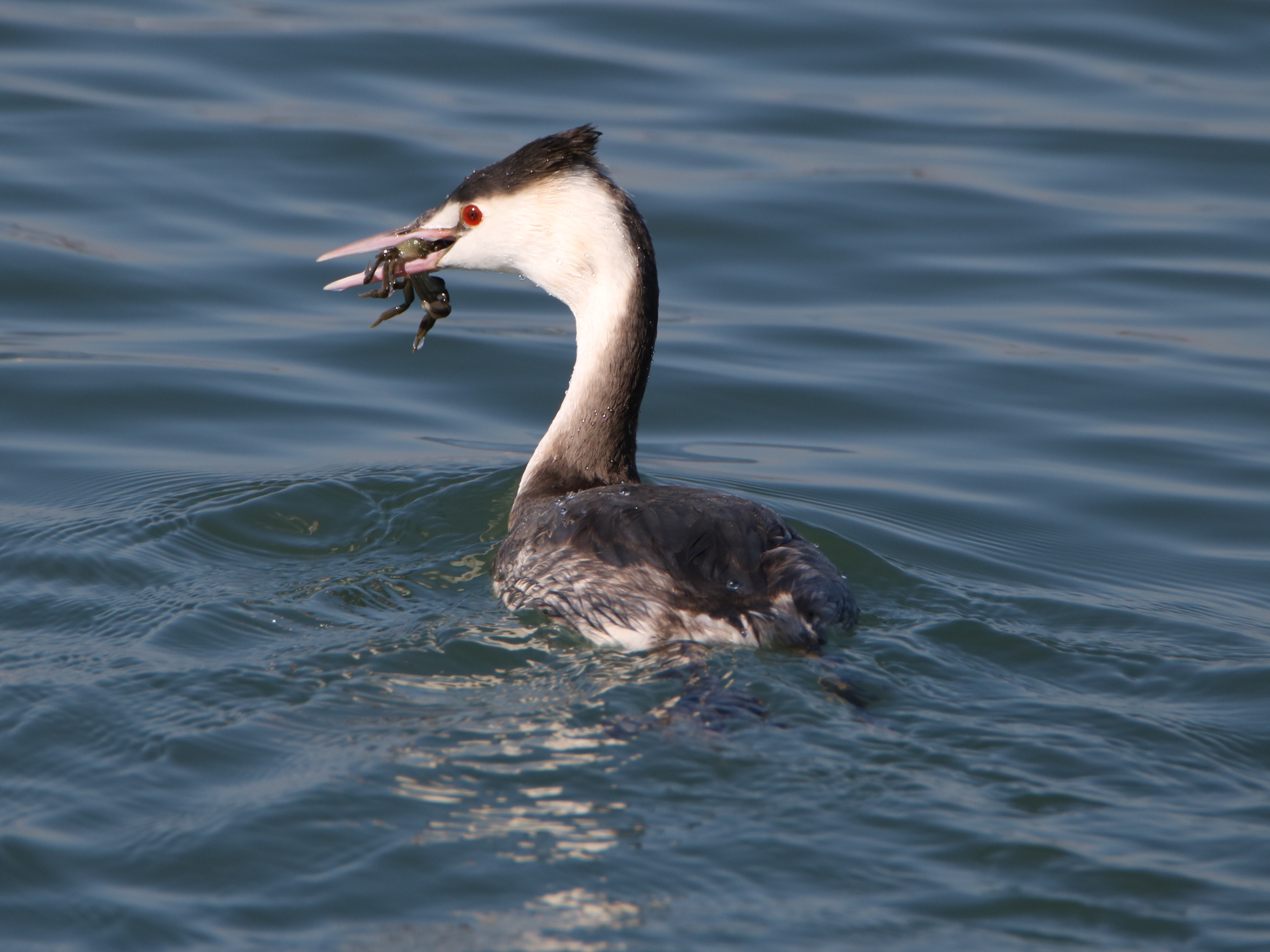
Colymbiformes
