= Colymbiculus =

Colymbiculus Temporal range: Lutetian

Scientific classification
- Domain: Eukaryota
- Kingdom: Animalia
- Phylum: Chordata
- Class: Aves
- Order: Gaviiformes
- Genus: †Colymbiculus; Mayr and Zvonok 2011

Type species
- †Colymbiculus udovichenkoi Mayr and Zvonok 2011

Extinct genus of birds

Colymbiculus is an extinct genus of loon that lived in Novopskov, Ukraine in the Eocene.
