= Zens =

Zens may refer to:

- Zens, the Luxembourgish name of Cents, a neighbourhood in the city of Luxembourg
- Zens, a former municipality in Germany that is now part of the municipality of Bördeland
