= Gaviella =

Gaviella Temporal range: Paleogene (Oligocene?)

Scientific classification
- Kingdom: Animalia
- Phylum: Chordata
- Class: Aves
- Order: Gaviiformes
- Family: Gaviidae
- Subfamily: †Gaviellinae; Wetmore, 1940
- Genus: †Gaviella; Wetmore, 1940

Type species
- †Gavia pusilla Shufeldt, 1915

Species
- †Gaviella pusilla (Shufeldt, 1915)

Synonyms
- Gavia pusilla Shufeldt, 1915

Extinct water bird

Gaviella is an alleged North American Paleogene gaviiform which the holotype (and only known specimen) consists of the proximal end of a left carpometacarpus from Wyoming, United States. However, Shufeldt mentioned the location and the age of the fossil was not recorded by J.B. Hatcher and his team who collected it. Shufeldt originally classified this taxon as a species of the living genus Gavia being half the size of the common loon (Gavia immer) due to some similarity of the carpometacarpus of the aforementioned extant species. In 1940 Wetmore argued the specimen is distinctive enough to, not only belong to its own genus which named Gaviella, but also felt they belong to their own subfamily Gaviellinae. This lead him to believe the specimen originated from the White River Formation.
