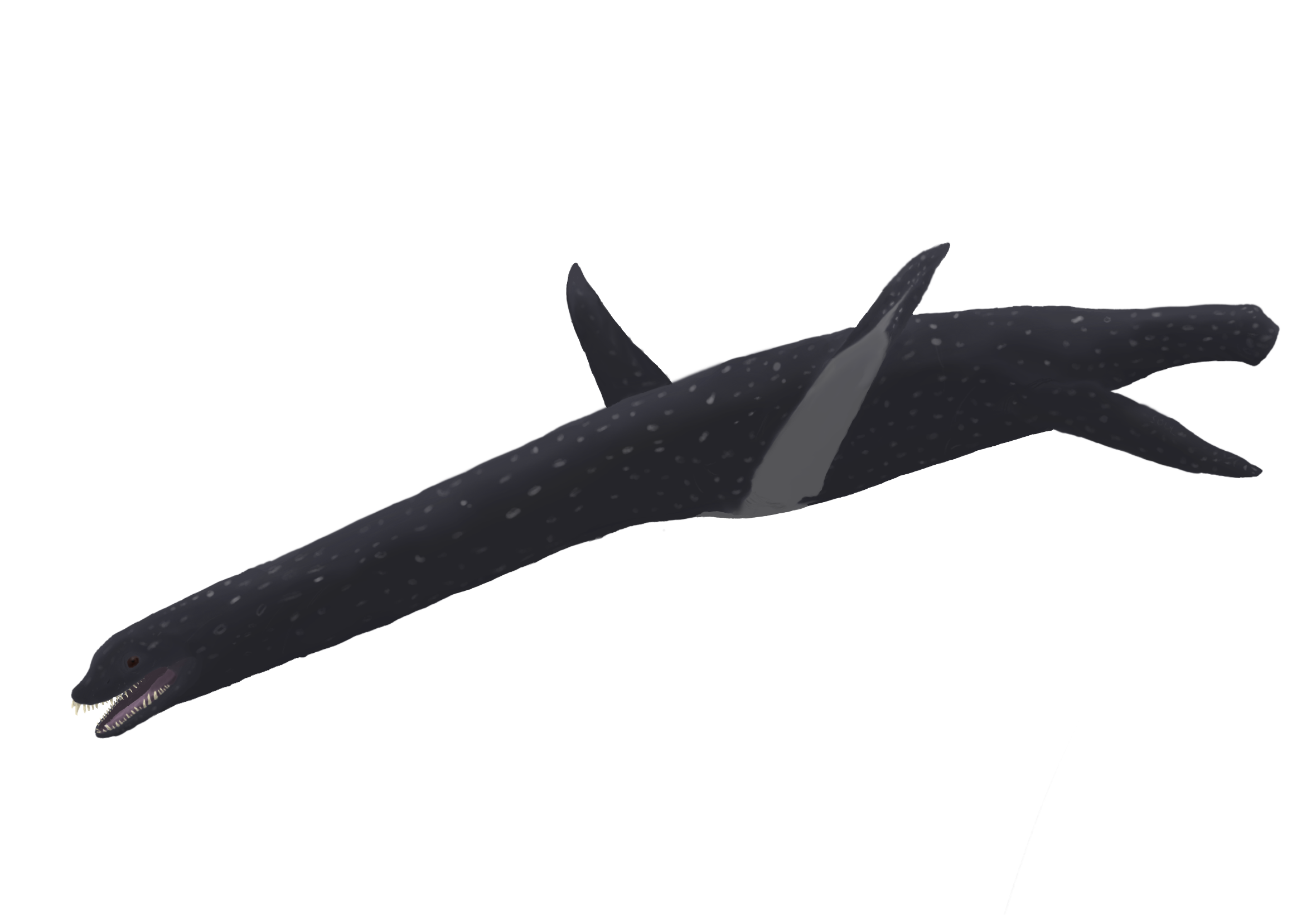
- Speculative life restoration

Scientific classification
- Kingdom: Animalia
- Phylum: Chordata
- Class: Reptilia
- Superorder: †Sauropterygia
- Order: †Plesiosauria
- Superfamily: †Plesiosauroidea
- Family: †Elasmosauridae
- Clade: †Weddellonectia
- Genus: †Marambionectes; O'Gorman et al., 2024
- Species: †M. molinai

Binomial name
- †Marambionectes molinai O'Gorman et al., 2024

= Marambionectes =

Marambionectes Temporal range: Late Cretaceous (Upper Maastrichtian)

Genus of elasmosaurid plesiosaurs

Marambionectes (meaning "Marambio Island swimmer") is an extinct genus of weddellonectian elasmosaurid plesiosaur from the Late Cretaceous López de Bertodano Formation of Antarctica. The genus contains a single species, M. molinai, known from a partial skeleton.

== Discovery and naming ==
The Marambionectes holotype specimen, IAA-Pv 752, was discovered in 2018 in sediments of the López de Bertodano Formation (unit 9) near on Marambio (Seymour) Island of James Ross Archipelago, Antarctica. The specimen is partially articulated and incomplete, consisting of the basioccipital, mandible, some teeth, cervical, pectoral, dorsal, and caudal vertebrae, ribs, an ilium, the right humerus and ulna, and a femur. The specimen belongs to an adult animal.

In 2024, O'Gorman and colleagues described Marambionectes molinai as a new genus and species of elasmosaurid plesiosaur based on these fossil remains. The generic name, Marambionectes, combines a reference to Marambio Island, where the fossil material was found, with the Greek word "nectes", meaning "swimmer". The specific name, molinai, honors the Argentinian fossil preparator Omar J. Molina and his Antarctic field work.

== Classification ==
In their phylogenetic analyses, O'Gorman et al. (2024) recovered Marambionectes as a derived member of the elasmosaurid clade Weddellonectia, as the sister taxon to the Aristonectinae. Nearly identical results were recovered by O'Keefe et al. (2025) in an updated version of this phylogenetic matrix, with Marambionectes as the aristonectine outgroup. These results are shown in the cladogram below. The ⊞ button can be clicked to expand the node.

- Weddellonectia
  - Tuarangisaurus
  - - Futabasaurus
    - - - Chubutinectes
        - - Aphrosaurus
          - Hydrotherosaurus
      - - - Morenosaurus
          - - Vegasaurus
            - Kawanectes
        - - Marambionectes
          - Aristonectinae
            ⊞
            - Wunyelfia
            - - MLP 99-XII-1-5
                (Aristonectinae indet.)
              - Aristonectes parvidens
              - Aristonectes quiriquinensis
              - Kaiwhekea
              - - Alexandronectes
                - Morturneria
            ⊟

== Controversies ==
The description of Marambionectes created controversy within the paleoart community when the researchers used AI-generated images to depict the species.
