= Antarcticavis =

Antarcticavis Temporal range: Late Cretaceous, Maastrichtian

Scientific classification
- Kingdom: Animalia
- Phylum: Chordata
- Class: Aves
- Genus: †Antarcticavis; Cordes-Person et al., 2020

Type species
- †Antarcticavis capelambensis Cordes-Person et al., 2020

Extinct genus of dinosaurs

Antarcticavis (meaning "Antarctic bird") is an extinct genus of birds of uncertain phylogenetic placement. It is known from a partial skeleton which was discovered in the Snow Hill Island Formation in Antarctica. The type and only species, Antarcticavis capelambensis, was announced in 2019, though the final version of the article naming it was published in 2020.

The holotype, SDSM 78147, consists of two thoracic vertebrae, the sternum keel, the right coracoid and shoulder blade, the sternal part of the left coracoid, the right upper arm, parts of the left upper arm, the proximal right ulna, the proximal left ulna and radius (articulated), the proximal right carpometacarpus, the proximal left carpometacarpus, the distal left carpometacarpus, the synsacrum, the right and left thighs, the proximal right tibiotarsus, the right and left distal tibiotarsus, and the proximal right tarsometatarsus.

More recent detailed analysis of the polar section modulus of the bones shows this genus in amphibious-seabird morphospaces, closest to Mergus merganser and Larus marinus. In their 2025 description of Pujatopouli, Irazoqui and colleagues recovered Antarcticavis in various positions using different matrices, either at a basal position within and possibly a sister taxon of the clade Neornithes, or within the clade Aequornithes, and concluded that its taxonomic assignment remains problematic.
