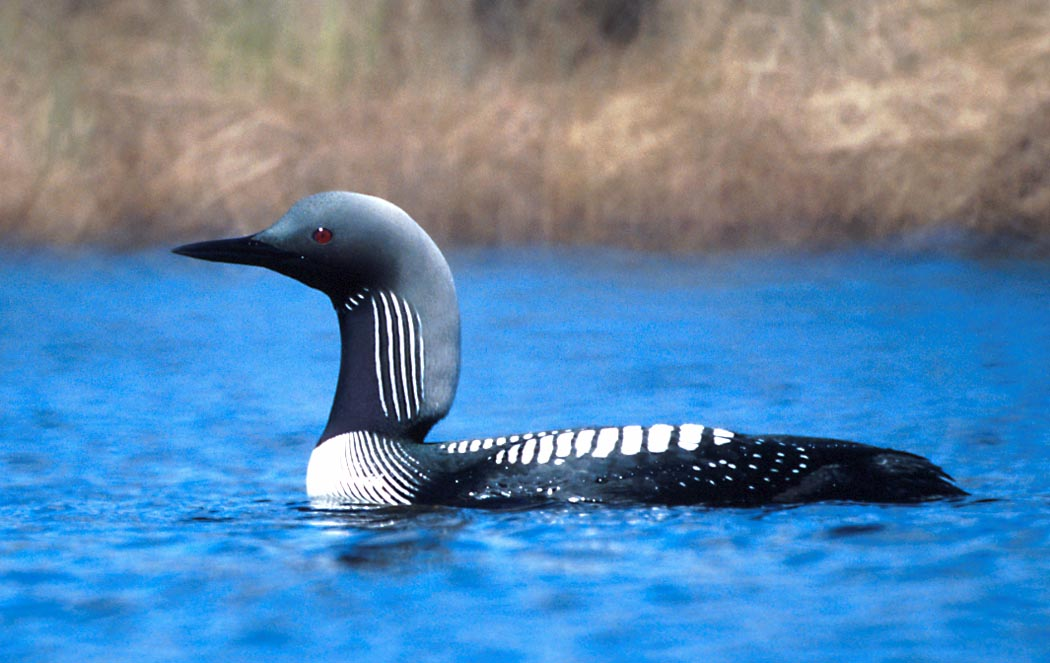
- a Pacific loon

Scientific classification
- Kingdom: Animalia
- Phylum: Chordata
- Class: Aves
- Clade: Phaethoquornithes
- Clade: Aequornithes
- Order: Gaviiformes; Wetmore & Miller, 1926

Genera
- †Colymbiculus; †Colymboides; Gavia; †Gaviella; †Petralca; †Nasidytes

Synonyms
- Colymbiformes Sharpe, 1891

= Gaviiformes =

Gaviiformes Temporal range: Early Eocene–Present

Order of birds

Gaviiformes (/ˈɡævi.ɪfɔːrmiːz/) is an order of aquatic birds containing the loons or divers and their closest extinct relatives. Modern gaviiformes are found in many parts of North America and northern Eurasia (Europe, Asia and debatably Africa), though prehistoric species were more widespread.

== Classification and evolution ==
There are five living species, and all are placed in the genus Gavia. The loons were formerly often considered to be the most ancient of the northern hemisphere bird families; this idea grew basically out of the perceived similarity of shape and (probably) habits between loons and the entirely unrelated extinct Cretaceous order Hesperornithiformes. In particular Enaliornis, which was apparently an ancestral and plesiomorphic member of that order, was sometimes used to support claims of Albian (Early Cretaceous) Gaviiformes.

More recently, it has become clear that the Anseriformes (waterfowl) and the Galliformes are the most ancient groups of modern birds, and these being distinct by the end of the Albian 100 million years ago (Ma), while just possible, is not at all well-supported. Loons belong to a more modern radiation. They were once believed to be related to grebes, which are also foot-propelled diving birds, and both groups were once classified together under the order Colymbiformes or in even older classifications as the Urinatores. The family name Urinatoridae was used for the family Gaviidae. This was derived from Latin Urinator meaning "diver". However, as recently as the 1930s, it was determined that the two groups (grebes and divers) are not that closely related at all and are merely the product of convergent evolution and adapted in a similar way to a similar ecological niche. The similarity is so strong that even the most modern cladistic analyses of general anatomical features are easily misled into grouping loons and grebes.

The Sibley-Ahlquist taxonomy still allied the loons with the grebes in its massively polyphyletic "Ciconiiformes", and it is almost certain that the relationships of loons lie with some of the orders placed therein. Namely, other recent authors have considered loons to share a rather close relationship with seabirds such as penguins (Sphenisciformes), tubenoses (Procellariiformes), waders (Charadriiformes) – and perhaps the newly discovered clade Mirandornithes which unites grebes (Podicipediformes) and their closest living relatives, the flamingos (Phoenicopteriformes). It is perhaps notable that some early penguins had skulls and beaks that were in many aspects similar to those of the known living and fossil Gaviiformes.

=== Fossil record ===
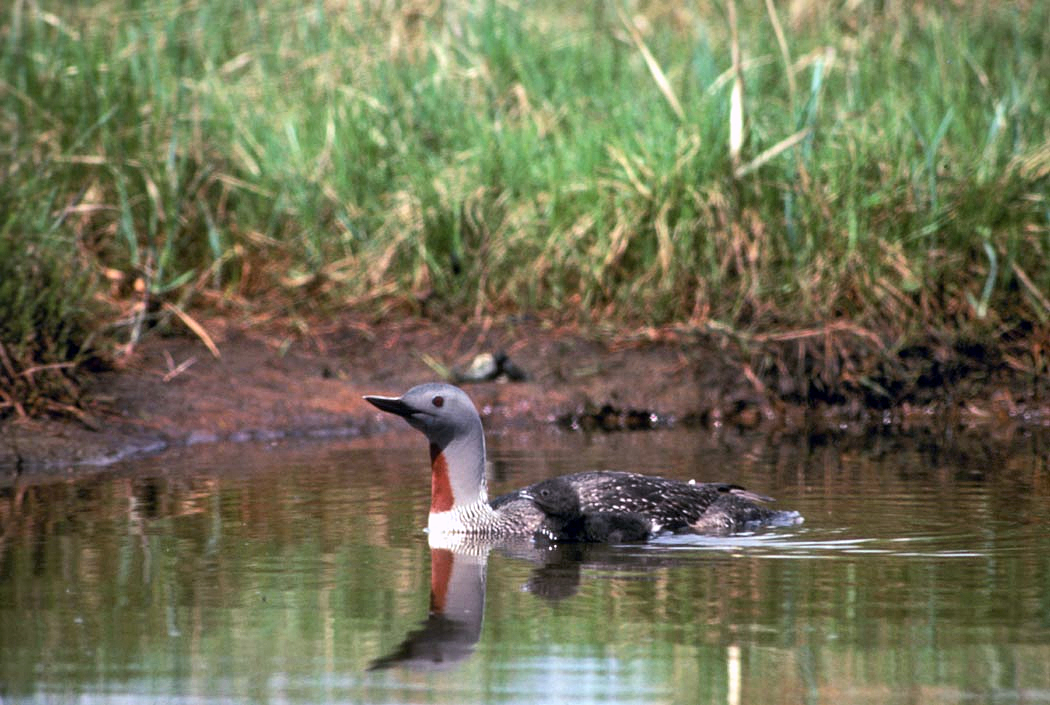
Red-throated loon (G. stellata), the smallest living Gavia species. Some Miocene members of this genus were smaller still.

In prehistoric times, the loons had a more southerly distribution than today, and their fossils have been found in places such as California, Florida and Italy. The conflicting molecular data regarding their relationships is not much resolved by the fossil record; though they seem to have originated at the end of the Late Cretaceous like their presumed relatives, modern loons are only known with certainty since the Eocene. By that time almost all modern bird orders are at least strongly suspected to have existed – if not known from unequivocally identified specimens – anyway.

The oldest known stem-gaviiform is Nasidytes from the Early Eocene aged London Clay of England, dating to around 55 million years ago.

Colymboides is widely known from early Priabonian – about 37 million years ago (Ma) in the Late Eocene – to Early Miocene (late Burdigalian, less than 20 Ma) limnic and marine rocks of western Eurasia north of the Alpide belt, between the Atlantic and the former Turgai Sea. It is usually placed in the Gaviidae already, but usually in a subfamily Colymboidinae, with the modern-type loons making up the Gaviinae. But the Colymboides material is generally quite distinct from modern loons, and may actually belong in a now-extinct family of primitive gaviiforms. Furthermore, the supposed genus could well be paraphyletic, so that for example Dyspetornis – which is now contained therein – might have to be separated again. A leg of an undescribed small diver was found in the Late Oligocene deposits at Enspel (Germany); it too may or may not belong to Colymboides. Of the crown genus Gavia, nearly ten prehistoric species have been named to date, and about as many undescribed ones await further study. The genus is known from the Early Miocene onwards, and the oldest members of them are rather small (some are smaller than the red-throated loon). Throughout the late Neogene, the genus by and large follows Cope's Rule.

Some older fossils are sometimes assigned to the Gaviiformes. From the Late Cretaceous, the genera Lonchodytes (Lance Formation, Wyoming) and Neogaeornis (Quinriquina Formation, Chile) have been described; both are usually allied with orders which are considered related to loons. In particular the latter is still sometimes explicitly proposed as a primitive loon as they both were initially, but other authors consider Neogaeornis a hesperornithiform; note however that neither Gaviiformes nor Hesperornithiformes are known from the Southern Hemisphere or anywhere near it. Lonchodytes was more certainly quite close to loons, but probably closer still to some of the loons' relatives. Eupterornis from the Paleocene of Châlons-sur-Vesle (France) has some features reminiscent of loons, but others seem more similar to Charadriiformes such as gulls (Laridae). A piece of a carpometacarpus supposedly from Oligocene rocks near Lusk, Wyoming was described as Gaviella pusilla, but this handbone also shows some similarities to the plotopterids which were flightless wing-propelled divers and if these are apomorphic would make an unconvincing member of the Gaviidae (though it still could be a small-winged gaviiform in a yet-undescribed family "Gaviellidae"): while the carpometacarpus in Gavia is somewhat convergent to that of wing-propelled divers, enabling the wings to be used as rudders for quick underwater turns, Colymboides still had an unspecialized plesiomorphic hand. Parascaniornis, sometimes allied to the loons by early authors, was eventually determined to be a junior synonym of the hesperornithiform Baptornis. A supposed mid-Eocene diver fossil form Geiseltal (Germany) was erroneously assigned to Gavia.

== See also ==
- List of Gaviiformes by population

== Bibliography ==
- Brodkorb, Pierce (1953). "A Review of the Pliocene Loons" (PDF). Condor. 55 (4): 211–214. doi:10.2307/1364769. JSTOR 1364769.
- Brodkorb, Pierce (1963). "Catalogue of fossil birds. Part 1 (Archaeopterygiformes through Ardeiformes)". Bulletin of the Florida State Museum, Biological Sciences. 7 (4): 179–293.
- Mayr, Gerald (2004). "A partial skeleton of a new fossil loon (Aves, Gaviiformes) from the early Oligocene of Germany with preserved stomach content" (PDF). J. Ornithol. 145 (4): 281–286. doi:10.1007/s10336-004-0050-9. S2CID 1070943. Archived from the original (PDF) on 2015-09-24.
- Mayr, Gerald (2009). Paleogene Fossil Birds. Heidelberg & New York: Springer-Verlag. ISBN 978-3-540-89627-2.
- Mlíkovský, Jirí (2002). Cenozoic Birds of the World, Part 1: Europe (PDF). Ninox Press, Prague.
- Olson, Storrs L. (1985). "Section X.I. Gaviiformes" (PDF). In Farner, D.S.; King, J.R.; Parkes, Kenneth C. (eds.). Avian Biology. Vol. 8. pp. 212–214. Archived from the original (PDF) on 2011-07-18.
- Storer, Robert W. (1956). "The Fossil Loon, Colymboides minutus" (PDF). Condor. 58 (6): 413–426. doi:10.2307/1365096. JSTOR 1365096.
