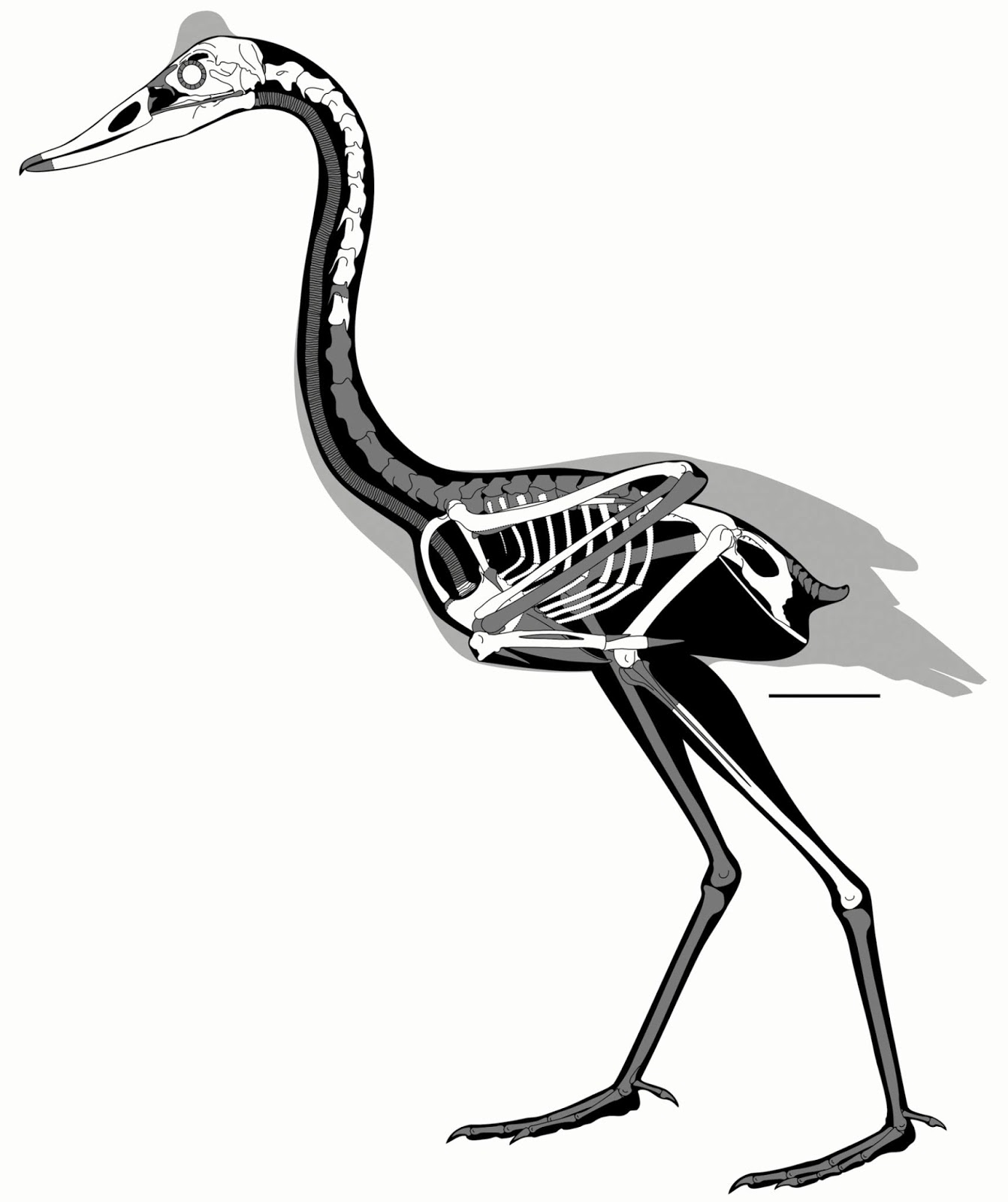
- Tambussi et al. skeletal reconstruction of Conflicto antarcticus

Scientific classification
- Kingdom: Animalia
- Phylum: Chordata
- Class: Aves
- Order: Anseriformes
- Genus: †Conflicto; Tambussi et al., 2019
- Species: †C. antarcticus

Binomial name
- †Conflicto antarcticus Tambussi et al., 2019

= Conflicto antarcticus =

Conflicto antarcticus Temporal range: Early Paleocene

Extinct species of bird

Conflicto antarcticus is an extinct species of stem waterfowl whose fossils were found in the early Paleocene López de Bertodano Formation of Antarctica, the only species of its genus. It is characterized by it slender body and long legs, yet possesses a duck-like bill which indicates the form of beak evolved early in Anseriformes.

== Description ==
Conflicto is known from a single partially complete specimen described in January 2019. It had long legs compared to its body, contrasting what is seen in modern ducks. It is estimated to be around 36 centimetres (14 in) in length, and had a long head relative to body size. Its beak had a similar structure to that of ducks and geese, but was not as wide. The rostrum possessed narial openings wider than that of modern Anseriformes. Its neck was about half its body length, possessing (estimated) 15 long vertebrae.

== Classification ==
Conflicto was a likely a stem anseriform, equally related to the current extant clades. The genus Anatalavis is hypothesized to be less related to the magpie goose as previously thought, but placed as a sister clade to Conflicto, though this isn't conclusive. The phylogenetic classification remains uncertain, but is more likely to be stem-waterfowl rather than crown-waterfowl, separated from modern anseriform lineages.
