= List of birds of Northern Ireland =

This is a list of the bird species recorded in Northern Ireland. The avifauna of Northern Ireland include a total of 371 species, of which 10 have been introduced by humans.

This list's taxonomic treatment (designation and sequence of orders, families and species) and nomenclature (English and scientific names) are those of the International Ornithological Congress (IOC) as of July 2021.

The following tags have been used to highlight several categories. The commonly occurring native species do not fall into any of these categories.

- (A) Accidental - a species that rarely or accidentally occurs in Northern Ireland
- (I) Introduced - a species introduced to Northern Ireland as a consequence, direct or indirect, of human actions

== Ducks, geese, and swans ==
Order: Anseriformes Family: Anatidae

Anatidae includes the ducks and most duck-like waterfowl, such as geese and swans. These birds are adapted to an aquatic existence with webbed feet, flattened bills, and feathers that are excellent at shedding water due to an oily coating.

- Brant goose, Branta bernicla
- Canada goose, Branta canadensis (I)
- Barnacle goose, Branta leucopsis
- Cackling goose, Branta hutchinsii (A)
- Snow goose, Anser caerulescens (A)
- Greylag goose, Anser anser
- Taiga bean goose, Anser fabalis (A)
- Pink-footed goose, Anser brachyrhynchus
- Tundra bean goose, Anser serrirostris (A)
- Greater white-fronted goose, Anser albifrons
- Mute swan, Cygnus olor (I)
- Tundra swan, Cygnus columbianus
- Whooper swan, Cygnus cygnus
- Egyptian goose, Aloochen aegyptiaca (I)
- Common shelduck, Tadorna tadorna
- Ruddy shelduck, Tadorna ferruginea (A)
- Mandarin duck, Aix galericulata (I)
- Baikal teal, Sibirionetta formosa (A)
- Garganey, Spatula querquedula
- Blue-winged teal, Spatula discors (A)
- Northern shoveler, Spatula clypeata
- Gadwall, Mareca strepera
- Eurasian wigeon, Mareca penelope
- American wigeon, Mareca americana (A)
- Mallard, Anas platyrhynchos
- American black duck, Anas rubripes (A)
- Northern pintail, Anas acuta
- Eurasian teal, Anas crecca
- Green-winged teal, Anas carolinensis
- Red-crested pochard, Netta rufina
- Common pochard, Aythya ferina
- Ferruginous duck, Aythya nyroca (A)
- Ring-necked duck, Aythya collaris (A)
- Tufted duck, Aythya fuligula
- Greater scaup, Aythya marila
- Lesser scaup, Aythya affinis (A)
- King eider, Somateria spectabilis (A)
- Common eider, Somateria mollissima
- Surf scoter, Melanitta perspicillata (A)
- Velvet scoter, Melanitta fusca
- Common scoter, Melanitta nigra
- Long-tailed duck, Clangula hyemalis
- Bufflehead, Bucephala albeola (A)
- Common goldeneye, Bucephala clangula
- Barrow's goldeneye, Bucephala islandica (A)
- Smew, Mergellus albellus
- Hooded merganser, Lophodytes cucullatus (A)
- Common merganser, Mergus merganser
- Red-breasted merganser, Mergus serrator
- Ruddy duck, Oxyura jamaicensis (I)

== Pheasants, grouse, and allies ==
Order: Galliformes Family: Phasianidae

These are terrestrial species of gamebirds, feeding and nesting on the ground. They are variable in size but generally plump, with broad and relatively short wings.

- Willow ptarmigan, Lagopus lagopus (A)
- Western capercaillie, Tetrao urogallus (I)
- Grey partridge, Perdix perdix (I)
- Common pheasant, Phasianus colchicus (I)
- Common quail, Coturnix coturnix
- Red-legged partridge, Alectorix rufa (I)

== Nightjars and allies ==
Order: Caprimulgiformes Family: Caprimulgidae

Nightjars are medium-sized nocturnal birds that usually nest on the ground. They have long wings, short legs and very short bills. Most have small feet, of little use for walking, and long pointed wings. Their soft plumage is camouflaged to resemble bark or leaves.

- Common nighthawk, Chordeiles minor (A)
- European nightjar, Caprimulgus europaeus (A)

== Swifts ==
Order: Apodiformes Family: Apodidae

Swifts are small birds which spend the majority of their lives flying. These birds have very short legs and never settle voluntarily on the ground, perching instead only on vertical surfaces. Many swifts have long swept-back wings which resemble a crescent or boomerang.

- Alpine swift, Apus melba (A)
- Common swift, Apus apus
- Pallid swift, Apus pallidus (A)

== Cuckoos ==
Order: Cuculiformes Family: Cuculidae

The family Cuculidae includes cuckoos, roadrunners and anis. These birds are of variable size with slender bodies, long tails and strong legs. The Old World cuckoos are brood parasites.

- Great spotted cuckoo, Clamator glandarius (A)
- Yellow-billed cuckoo, Coccyzus americanus (A)
- Black-billed cuckoo, Coccyzus erythropthalmus (A)
- Common cuckoo, Cuculus canorus

== Sandgrouse ==
Order: Pterocliformes Family: Pteroclidae

Sandgrouse have small, pigeon like heads and necks, but sturdy compact bodies. They have long pointed wings and sometimes tails and a fast direct flight. Flocks fly to watering holes at dawn and dusk. Their legs are feathered down to the toes.

- Pallas's sandgrouse, Syrrhaptes paradoxus (A)

== Pigeons and doves ==
Order: Columbiformes Family: Columbidae

Pigeons and doves are stout-bodied birds with short necks and short slender bills with a fleshy cere.

- Rock dove, Columba livia
- Stock dove, Columba oenas
- Common wood pigeon, Columba palumbus
- European turtle dove, Streptopelia turtur
- Eurasian collared dove, Streptopelia decaocto

== Rails, gallinules, and coots ==
Order: Gruiformes Family: Rallidae

Rallidae is a large family of small to medium-sized birds which includes the rails, crakes, coots and gallinules. Typically they inhabit dense vegetation in damp environments near lakes, swamps or rivers. In general they are shy and secretive birds, making them difficult to observe. Most species have strong legs and long toes which are well adapted to soft uneven surfaces. They tend to have short, rounded wings and to be weak fliers.

- Water rail, Rallus aquaticus
- Corncrake, Crex crex
- Spotted crake, Porzana porzana
- Common moorhen, Gallinula chloropus
- Eurasian coot, Fulica atra

== Cranes ==
Order: Gruiformes Family: Gruidae

Cranes are large, long-legged and long-necked birds. Unlike the similar-looking but unrelated herons, cranes fly with necks outstretched, not pulled back. Most have elaborate and noisy courting displays or "dances".

- Crane, Grus grus (A)

== Grebes ==
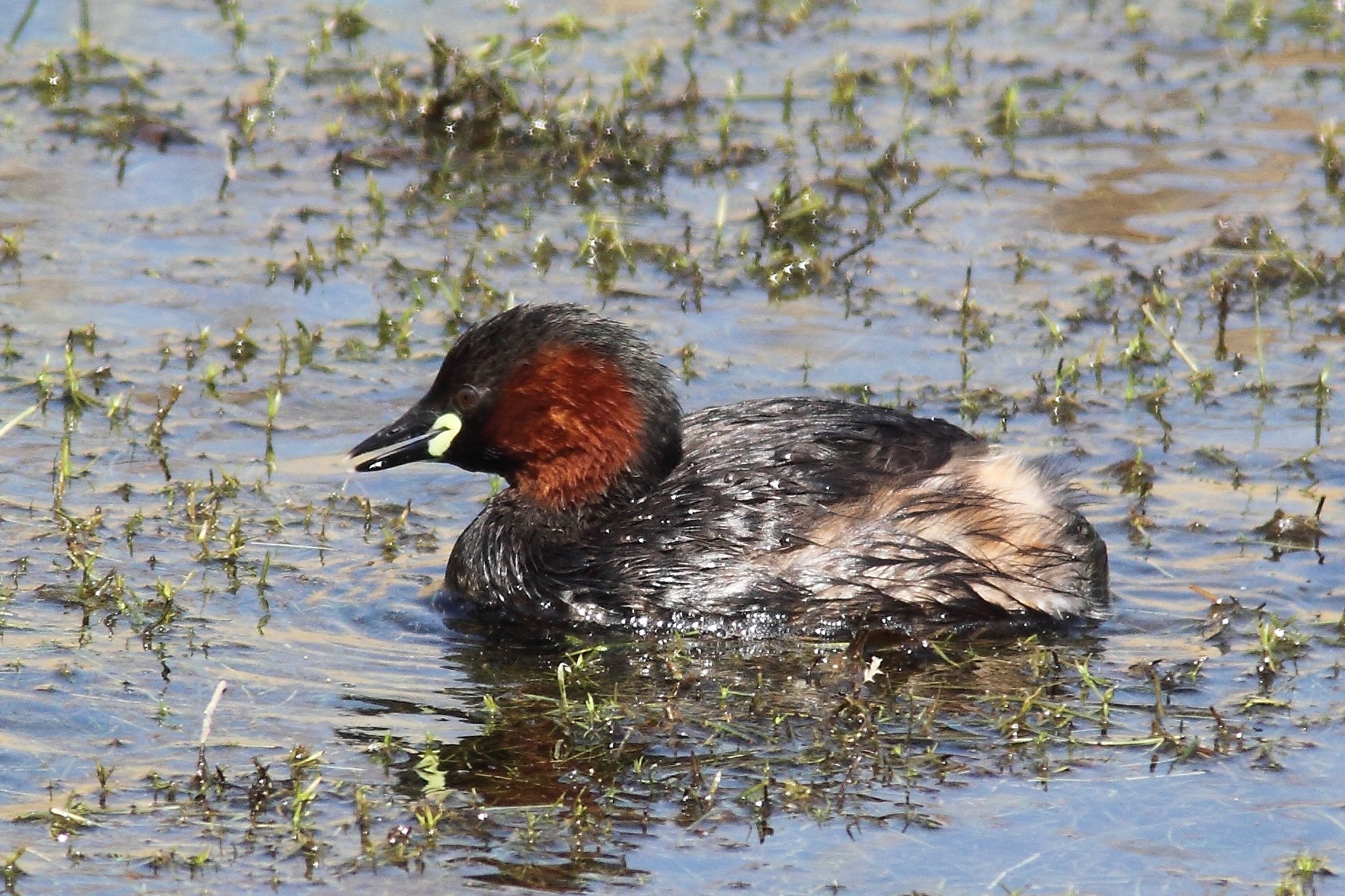
Little grebe

Order: Podicipediformes Family: Podicipedidae

Grebes are small to medium-large freshwater diving birds. They have lobed toes and are excellent swimmers and divers. However, they have their feet placed far back on the body, making them quite ungainly on land.

- Little grebe, Tachybaptus ruficollis
- Red-necked grebe, Podiceps grisegena (A)
- Great crested grebe, Podiceps cristatus
- Slavonian grebe, Podiceps auritus
- Black-necked grebe, Podiceps nigricollis (A)

== Stone-curlews ==
Order: Charadriiformes Family: Burhinidae

The stone-curlews are a group of largely tropical waders in the family Burhinidae. They are found worldwide within the tropical zone, with some species also breeding in temperate Europe and Australia. They are medium to large waders with strong black or yellow-black bills, large yellow eyes and cryptic plumage. Despite being classed as waders, most species have a preference for arid or semi-arid habitats.

- Eurasian stone-curlew, Burhinus oedicnemus (A)

== Oystercatchers ==
Order: Charadriiformes Family: Haematopodidae

The oystercatchers are large and noisy plover-like birds, with strong bills used for smashing or prising open molluscs.

- Eurasian oystercatcher, Haematopus ostralegus

== Stilts and avocets ==
Order: Charadriiformes Family: Recurvirostridae

Recurvirostridae is a family of large wading birds, which includes the avocets and stilts. The avocets have long legs and long up-curved bills. The stilts have extremely long legs and long, thin, straight bills.

- Black-winged stilt, Himantopus himantopus (A)
- Pied avocet, Recurvirostra avosetta

== Plovers and lapwings ==
Order: Charadriiformes Family: Charadriidae

The family Charadriidae include the plovers, dotterels and lapwings. They are small to medium-sized birds with compact bodies, short, thick necks and long, usually pointed, wings. They are found in open country worldwide, mostly in habitats near water.

- Northern lapwing, Vanellus vanellus
- European golden-plover, Pluvialis apricaria
- Pacific golden plover, Pluvialis fulva (A)
- American golden plover, Pluvialis dominica (A)
- Grey plover, Pluvialis squatarola
- Common ringed plover, Charadrius hiaticula
- Little ringed plover, Charadrius dubius
- Killdeer, Charadrius vociferus (A)
- Kentish plover, Charadrius alexandrinus (A)
- Eurasian dotterel, Charadrius morinellus

== Sandpipers and allies ==
Order: Charadriiformes Family: Scolopacidae

Scolopacidae is a large diverse family of small to medium-sized shorebirds including the sandpipers, curlews, godwits, shanks, tattlers, woodcocks, snipes, dowitchers and phalaropes. The majority of these species eat small invertebrates picked out of the mud or soil. Variation in length of legs and bills enables multiple species to feed in the same habitat, particularly on the coast, without direct competition for food.

- Upland sandpiper, Bartramia longicauda (A)
- Eurasian whimbrel, Numenius phaeopus
- Eurasian curlew, Numenius arquata
- Bar-tailed godwit, Limosa lapponica
- Black-tailed godwit, Limosa limosa
- Ruddy turnstone, Arenaria interpres
- Red knot, Calidris canutus
- Ruff, Calidris pugnax
- Broad-billed sandpiper, Calidris falcinellus (A)
- Stilt sandpiper, Calidris himantopus (A)
- Curlew sandpiper, Calidris ferruginea
- Temminck's stint, Calidris temminckii (A)
- Sanderling, Calidris alba
- Dunlin, Calidris alpina
- Purple sandpiper, Calidris maritima
- Baird's sandpiper, Calidris bairdii (A)
- Little stint, Calidris minuta
- Least sandpiper, Calidris minutilla (A)
- White-rumped sandpiper, Calidris fuscicollis
- Buff-breasted sandpiper, Calidris subruficollis
- Pectoral sandpiper, Calidris melanotos
- Semipalmated sandpiper, Calidris pusilla (A)
- Long-billed dowitcher, Limnodromus scolopaceus (A)
- Short-billed dowitcher, Limnodromus griseus
- Eurasian woodcock, Scolopax rusticola
- Jack snipe, Lymnocryptes minimus
- Great snipe, Gallinago media
- Common snipe, Gallinago gallinago
- Wilson's snipe, Gallinago delicata (A)
- Wilson's phalarope, Phalaropus tricolor
- Red-necked phalarope, Phalaropus lobatus
- Red phalarope, Phalaropus fulicarius
- Common sandpiper, Actitis hypoleucos
- Spotted sandpiper, Actitis macularius (A)
- Green sandpiper, Tringa ochropus
- Lesser yellowlegs, Tringa flavipes (A)
- Common redshank, Tringa totanus
- Wood sandpiper, Tringa glareola
- Spotted redshank, Tringa erythropus
- Common greenshank, Tringa nebularia
- Greater yellowlegs, Tringa melanoleuca (A)

== Pratincoles and coursers ==
Order: Charadriiformes Family: Glareolidae

Glareolidae is a family of wading birds comprising the pratincoles, which have short legs, long pointed wings, and long forked tails, and the coursers, which have long legs, short wings, and long, pointed bills which curve downwards.

- Collared pratincole, Glareola pratincola (A)
- Black-winged pratincole, Glareola nordmanni (A)

== Gulls, terns, and skimmers ==
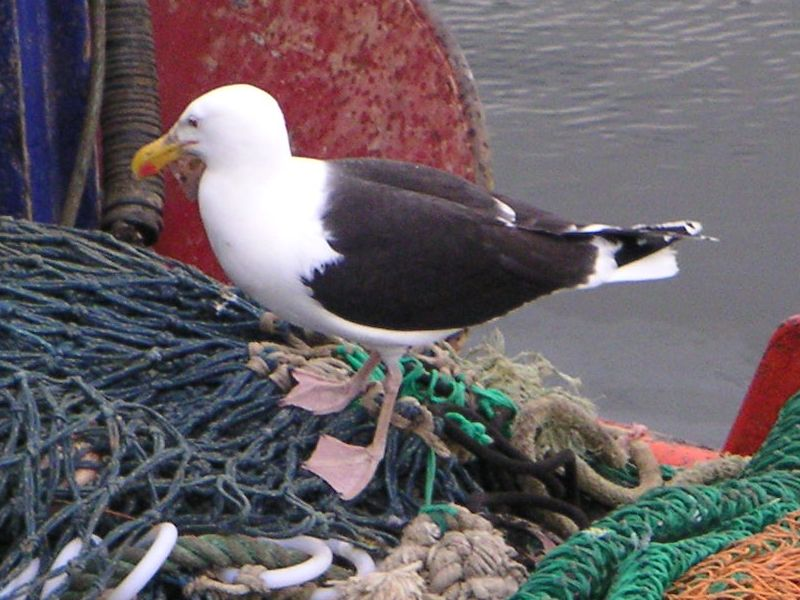
Great black-backed gull

Order: Charadriiformes Family: Laridae

Laridae is a family of medium to large seabirds, the gulls, terns, and skimmers. Gulls are typically grey or white, often with black markings on the head or wings. They have stout, longish bills and webbed feet. Terns are a group of generally medium to large seabirds typically with grey or white plumage, often with black markings on the head. Most terns hunt fish by diving but some pick insects off the surface of fresh water. Terns are generally long-lived birds, with several species known to live in excess of 30 years.

- Black-legged kittiwake, Rissa tridactyla
- Ivory gull, Pagophila eburnea (A)
- Sabine's gull, Xema sabini
- Bonaparte's gull, Chroicocephalus philadelphia (A)
- Black-headed gull, Chroicocephalus ridibundus
- Little gull, Hydrocoloeus minutus (A)
- Ross's gull, Rhodostethia rosea (A)
- Laughing gull, Leucophaeus atricilla
- Franklin's gull, Leucophaeus pipixcan (A)
- Mediterranean gull, Ichthyaetus melanocephalus
- Common gull, Larus canus
- Ring-billed gull, Larus delawarensis (A)
- Great black-backed gull, Larus marinus
- Glaucous gull, Larus hyperboreus
- Iceland gull, Larus glaucoides
- European herring gull, Larus argentatus
- American herring gull, Larus smithsonianus (A)
- Caspian gull, Larus cachinnans (A)
- Yellow-legged gull, Larus michahellis (A)
- Lesser black-backed gull, Larus fuscus
- Gull-billed tern, Gelochelidon nilotica (A)
- Lesser crested tern, Thalasseus bengalensis (A)
- Sandwich tern, Thalasseus sandvicensis
- Elegant tern, Thalasseus elegans (A)
- Little tern, Sternula albifrons
- Sooty tern, Onychoprion fuscatus (A)
- Roseate tern, Sterna dougallii
- Common tern, Sterna hirundo
- Arctic tern, Sterna paradisaea
- Forster's tern, Sterna forsteri (A)
- Whiskered tern, Chlidonias hybrida (A)
- White-winged tern, Chlidonias niger (A)
- Black tern, Chlidonias niger

== Skuas and jaegers ==
Order: Charadriiformes Family: Stercorariidae

The family Stercorariidae are, in general, medium to large birds, typically with grey or brown plumage, often with white markings on the wings. They nest on the ground in temperate and arctic regions and are long-distance migrants.

- Great skua, Stercorarius skua
- Pomarine jaeger, Stercorarius pomarinus
- Parasitic jaeger, Stercorarius parasiticus
- Long-tailed jaeger, Stercorarius longicaudus

== Auks, murres, and puffins ==
Order: Charadriiformes Family: Alcidae

Alcids are superficially similar to penguins due to their black-and-white colours, their upright posture and some of their habits, however they are not related to the penguins and differ in being able to fly. Auks live on the open sea, only deliberately coming ashore to nest.

- Little auk, Alle alle
- Common murre, Uria aalge
- Razorbill, Alca torda
- Great auk, Pinguinus impennis (A) extinct
- Black guillemot, Cepphus grylle
- Atlantic puffin, Fratercula arctica

== Loons ==
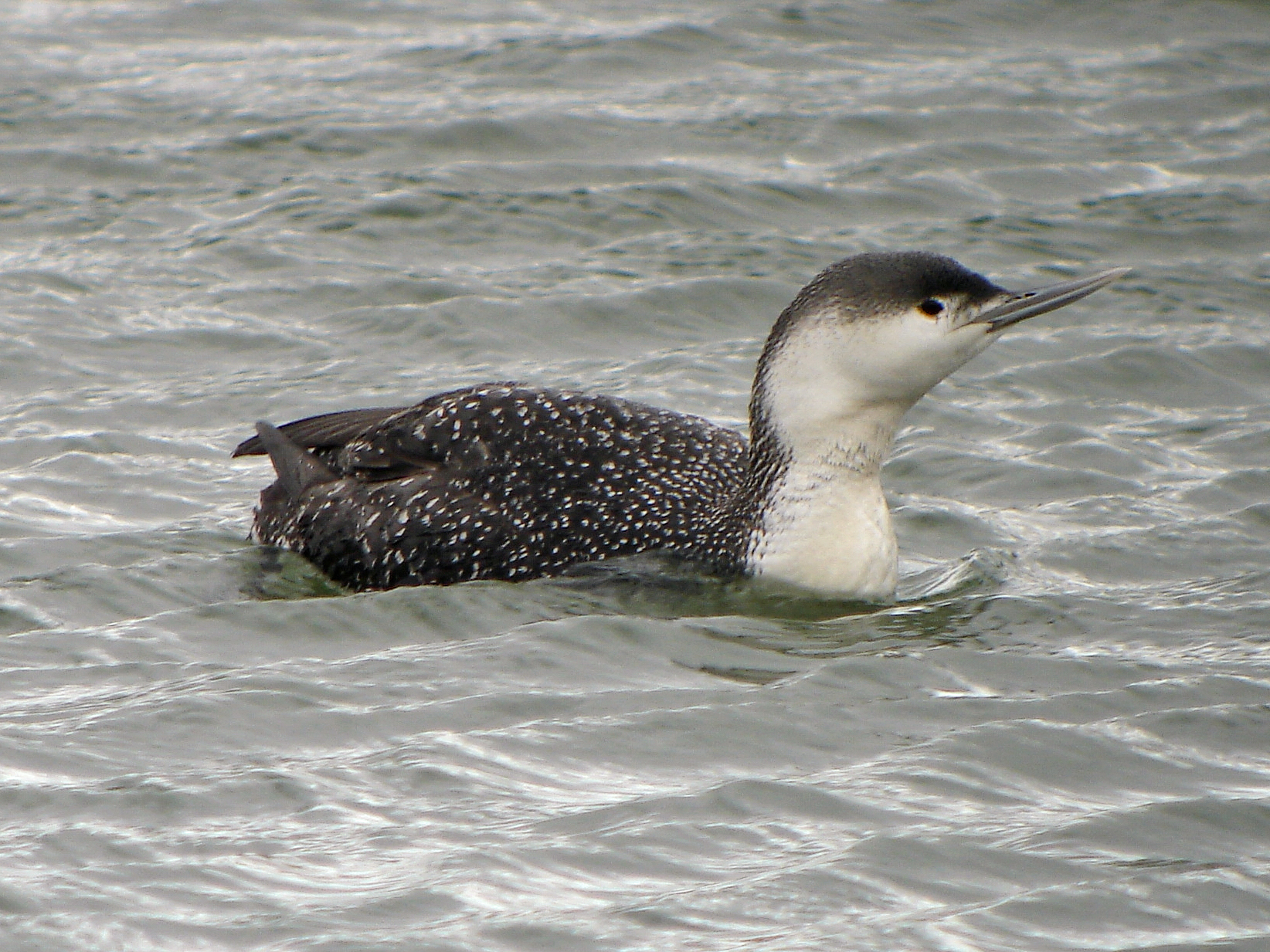
Red-throated diver

Order: Gaviiformes Family: Gaviidae

Loons, known as divers in Europe, are a group of aquatic birds found in many parts of North America and northern Europe. They are the size of a large duck or small goose, which they somewhat resemble when swimming, but to which they are completely unrelated.

- Red-throated loon, Gavia stellata
- Black-throated loon, Gavia arctica
- Pacific loon, Gavia pacifica (A)
- Common loon, Gavia immer
- Yellow-billed loon, Gavia adamsii (A)

== Southern storm petrels ==
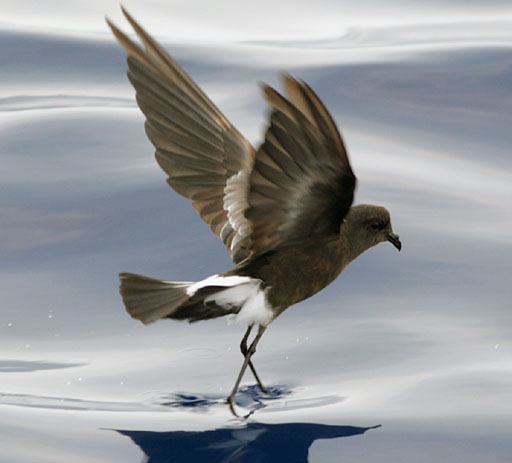
Wilson's storm petrel

Order: Procellariiformes Family: Oceanitidae

The austral storm petrels are relatives of the petrels and are the smallest seabirds. They feed on planktonic crustaceans and small fish picked from the surface, typically while hovering.

- Wilson's storm petrel, Oceanites oceanicus (A)

== Albatrosses ==
Order: Procellariiformes Family: Diomedeidae

The albatrosses are among the largest of flying birds, and the great albatrosses from the genus Diomedea have the largest wingspans of any extant birds.

- Black-browed albatross, Thalassarche melanophris (A)

== Northern storm petrels ==
Order: Procellariiformes Family: Hydrobatidae

The northern storm petrels are relatives of the petrels and are the smallest seabirds. They feed on planktonic crustaceans and small fish picked from the surface, typically while hovering. The flight is fluttering and sometimes bat-like.

- European storm petrel, Hydrobates pelagicus
- Leach's storm petrel, Hydrobates leucorhoa

== Petrels and shearwaters ==
Order: Procellariiformes Family: Procellaridae

The procellariids are the main group of medium-sized "true petrels", characterised by united nostrils with medium septum and a long outer functional primary.

- Northern fulmar, Fulmarus glacialis
- Fea's petrel, Pterodroma feae (A)
- Scopoli's shearwater, Calonectris diomedea (A)
- Cory's shearwater, Calonectris borealis
- Sooty shearwater, Ardenna griseus
- Great shearwater, Ardenna gravis
- Manx shearwater, Puffinus puffinus
- Balearic shearwater, Puffinus mauretanicus
- Barolo shearwater, Puffinus baroli (A)

== Storks ==
Order: Ciconiiformes Family: Ciconiidae

Storks are large, long-legged, long-necked, wading birds with long, stout bills. Storks are mute, but bill-clattering is an important mode of communication at the nest. Their nests can be large and may be reused for many years. Many species are migratory.

- Black stork, Ciconia nigra (A)
- White stork, Ciconia ciconia (A)

== Boobies and gannets ==
Order: Suliformes Family: Sulidae

The sulids comprise the gannets and boobies. Both groups are medium to large coastal seabirds that plunge-dive for fish.

- Northern gannet, Morus bassanus

== Cormorants ==
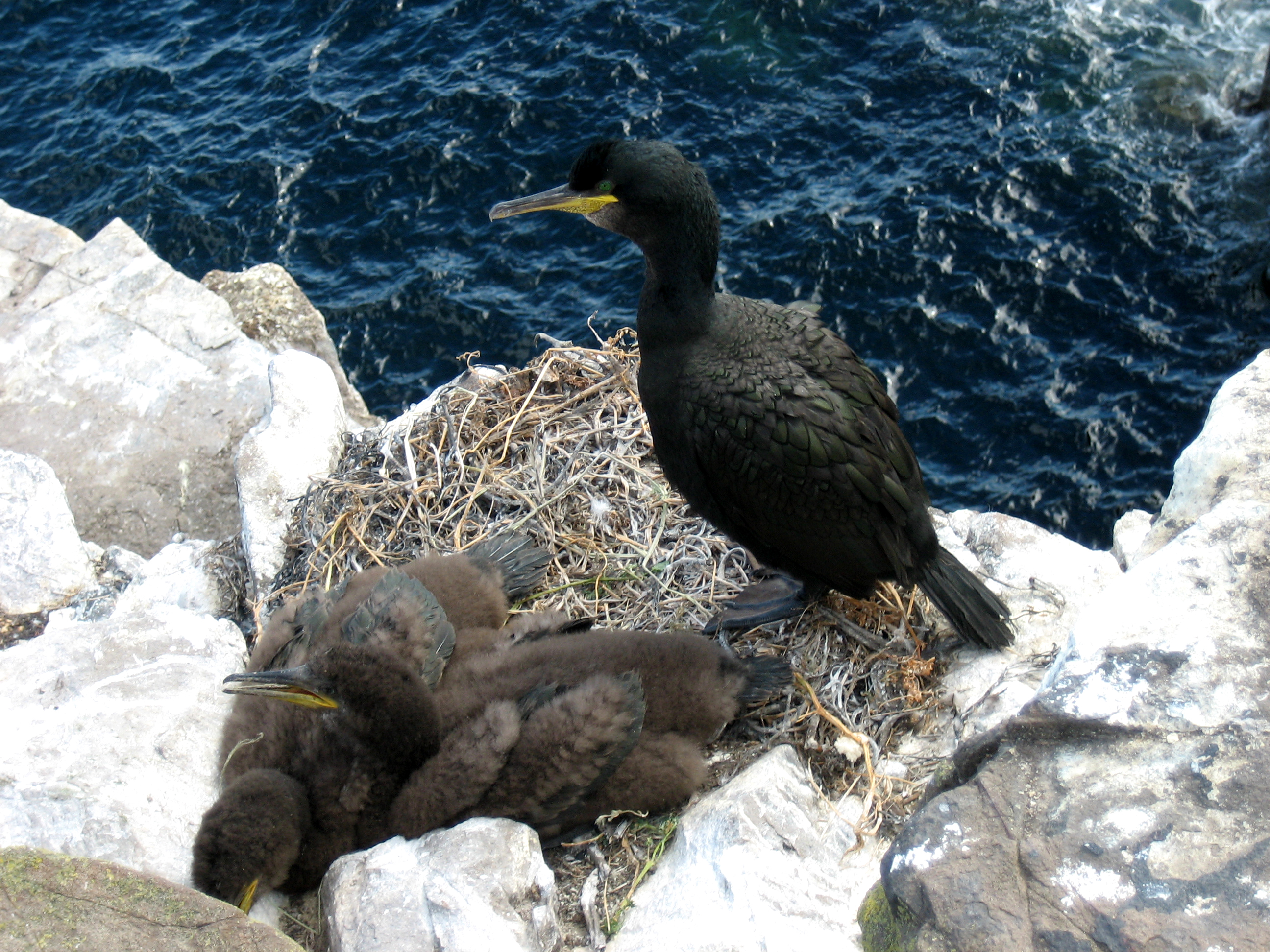
European shag

Order: Suliformes Family: Phalacrocoracidae

Phalacrocoracidae is a family of medium to large coastal, fish-eating seabirds that includes cormorants and shags. Plumage coloration varies, with the majority having mainly dark plumage, some species being black-and-white, and a few being colorful.

- Great cormorant, Phalacrocorax carbo
- European shag, Gulosus aristotelis

== Ibises and Spoonbills ==
Order: Pelecaniformes Family: Threskiornithidae

Threskiornithidae is a family of large terrestrial and wading birds which includes the ibises and spoonbills. They have long, broad wings with 11 primary and about 20 secondary feathers. They are strong fliers and despite their size and weight, very capable soarers.

- African sacred ibis, Plegadis falcinellus (I)
- Glossy ibis, Plegadis falcinellus (A)
- Eurasian spoonbill, Platalea leucorodia

== Herons and bitterns ==
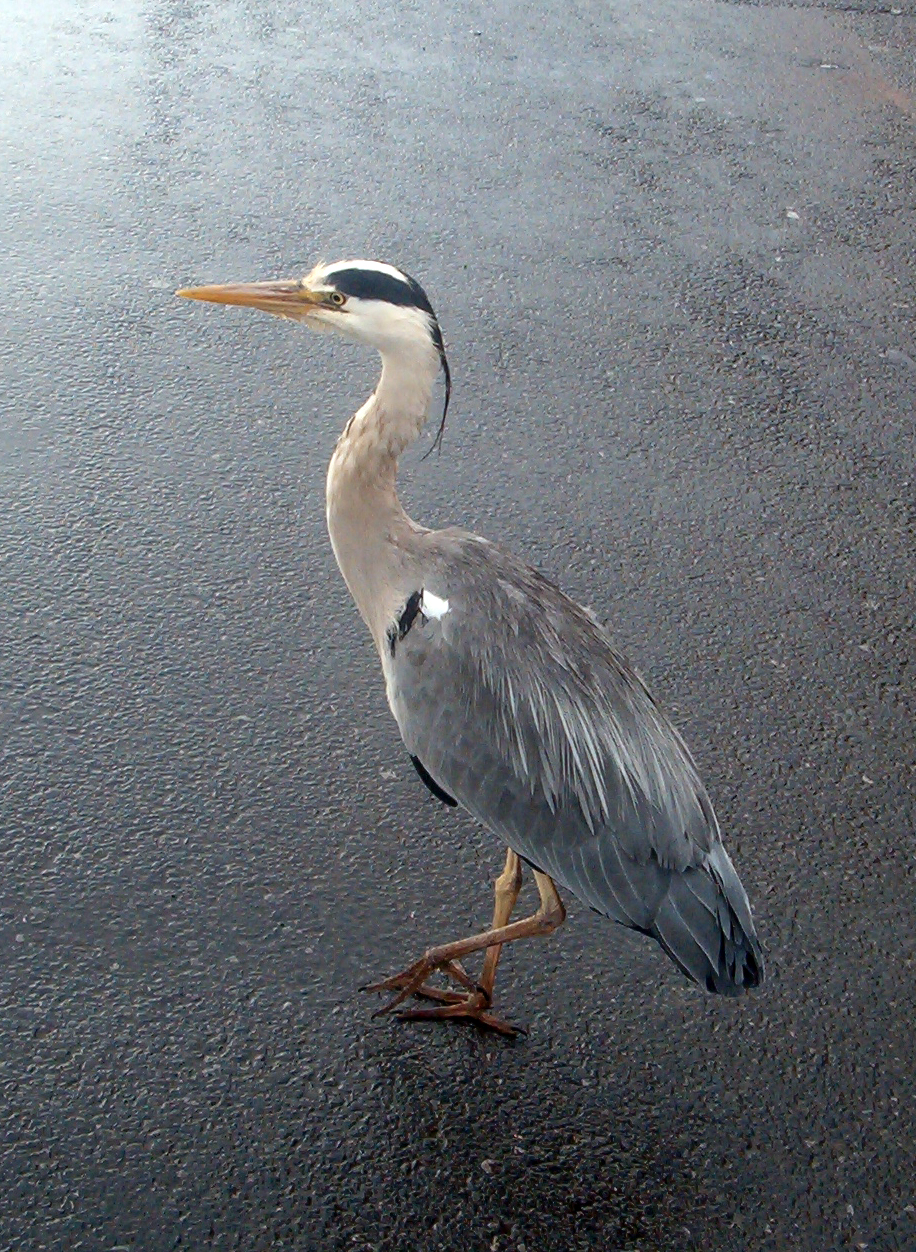
Grey heron

Order: Pelecaniformes Family: Ardeidae

The family Ardeidae contains the bitterns, herons and egrets. Herons and egrets are medium to large wading birds with long necks and legs. Bitterns tend to be shorter necked and more wary. Members of Ardeidae fly with their necks retracted, unlike other long-necked birds such as storks, ibises and spoonbills.

- Eurasian bittern, Botaurus stellaris (A)
- American bittern, Botaurus lentiginosus (A)
- Little bittern, Ixobrychus minutus (A)
- Black-crowned night heron, Nycticorax nycticorax (A)
- Squacco heron, Ardeola ralloides (A)
- Western cattle egret, Bubulcus ibis (A)
- Grey heron, Ardea cinerea
- Purple heron, Ardea purpurea
- Great egret, Ardea alba (A)
- Little egret, Egretta garzetta

== Ospreys ==
Order: Accipitriformes Family: Pandionidae

The osprey is a medium-large raptor which is a specialist fish-eater.

- Western osprey, Pandion haliaetus

== Hawks, eagles, and kites ==
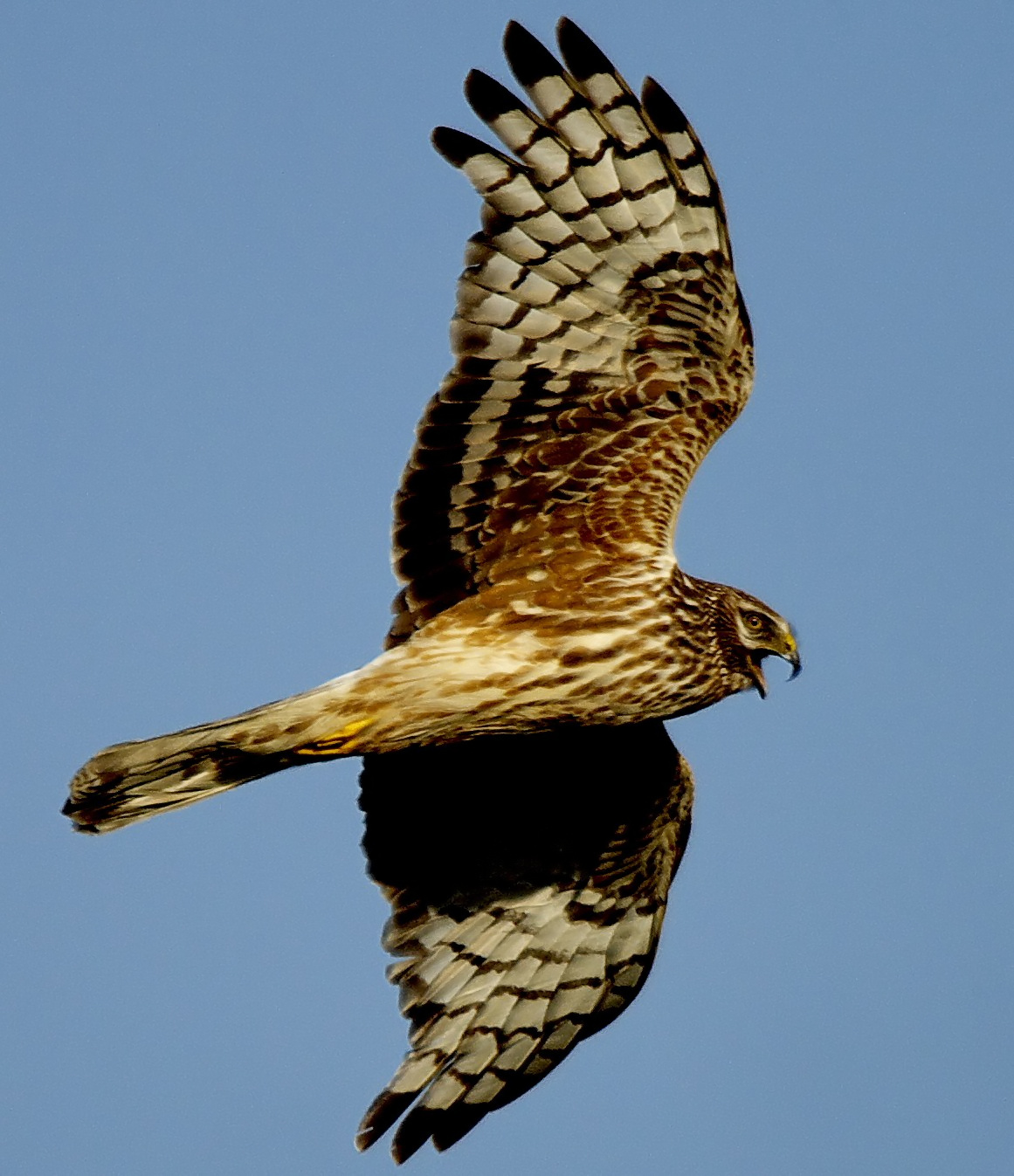
Hen harrier

Order: Accipitriformes Family: Accipitridae

Accipitridae is a family of birds of prey, which includes hawks, eagles, kites, harriers and Old World vultures. These birds have powerful hooked beaks for tearing flesh from their prey, strong legs, powerful talons and keen eyesight.

- European honey buzzard, Pernis apivorus (A)
- Golden eagle, Aquila chrysaetos (A)
- Eurasian sparrowhawk, Accipiter nisus
- Northern goshawk, Accipiter gentilis
- Western marsh harrier, Circus aeruginosus
- Hen harrier Circus cyaneus
- Pallid harrier Circus macrourus (A)
- Montagu's harrier Circus macrourus
- Red kite, Milvus milvus (I)
- Black kite, Milvus migrans (A)
- White-tailed eagle, Haliaaetus albicilla (A)
- Bald eagle, Haliaaetus leucocephalus (A)
- Rough-legged buzzard, Buteo lagopus (A)
- Common buzzard, Buteo buteo

== Barn owls ==
Order: Strigiformes Family: Tytonidae

Barn owls are medium to large owls with large heads and characteristic heart-shaped faces. They have long strong legs with powerful talons.

- Western barn owl, Tyto alba

== Owls ==
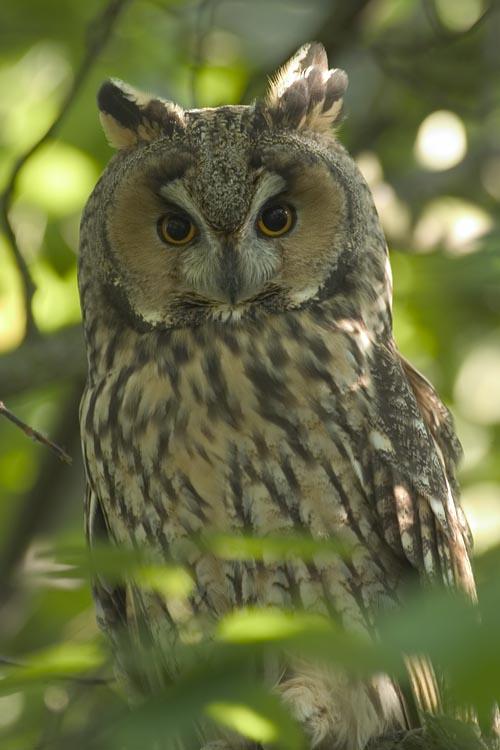
Long-eared owl

Order: Strigiformes Family: Strigidae

The typical owls are small to large solitary nocturnal birds of prey. They have large forward-facing eyes and ears, a hawk-like beak and a conspicuous circle of feathers around each eye called a facial disk.

- Little owl, Athene noctua (A)
- Eurasian scops owl, Otus scops (A)
- Long-eared owl, Asio otus
- Short-eared owl, Asio flammeus
- Snowy owl, Bubo scandiaca (A)

== Hoopoes ==
Order: Bucerotiformes Family: Upupidae

Hoopoes have black, white and orangey-pink colouring with a large erectile crest on their head.

- Eurasian hoopoe, Upupa epops

== Rollers ==
Order: Coraciiformes Family: Coraciidae

Rollers resemble crows in size and build, but are more closely related to the kingfishers and bee-eaters. They share the colourful appearance of those groups with blues and browns predominating. The two inner front toes are connected, but the outer toe is not.

- European roller, Coracias garrulus (A)

== Kingfishers ==
Order: Coraciiformes Family: Alcedinidae

Kingfishers are medium-sized birds with large heads, long, pointed bills, short legs and stubby tails.

- Common kingfisher, Alcedo atthis
- Belted kingfisher, Megaceryle alcyon (A)

== Bee-eaters ==
Order: Coraciiformes Family: Meropidae

The bee-eaters are a group of near passerine birds in the family Meropidae. Most species are found in Africa but others occur in southern Europe, Madagascar, Australia and New Guinea. They are characterised by richly coloured plumage, slender bodies and usually elongated central tail feathers. All are colourful and have long downturned bills and pointed wings, which give them a swallow-like appearance when seen from afar.

- European bee-eater, Merops apiaster

== Woodpeckers ==
Order: Piciformes Family: Picidae

Woodpeckers are small to medium-sized birds with chisel-like beaks, short legs, stiff tails and long tongues used for capturing insects. Some species have feet with two toes pointing forward and two backward, while several species have only three toes. Many woodpeckers have the habit of tapping noisily on tree trunks with their beaks.

- Eurasian wryneck, Jynx torquilla
- Lesser spotted woodpecker, Dryobates minor
- Great spotted woodpecker, Dendrocopos major
- European green woodpecker, Picus viridis (A)

== Falcons and caracaras ==
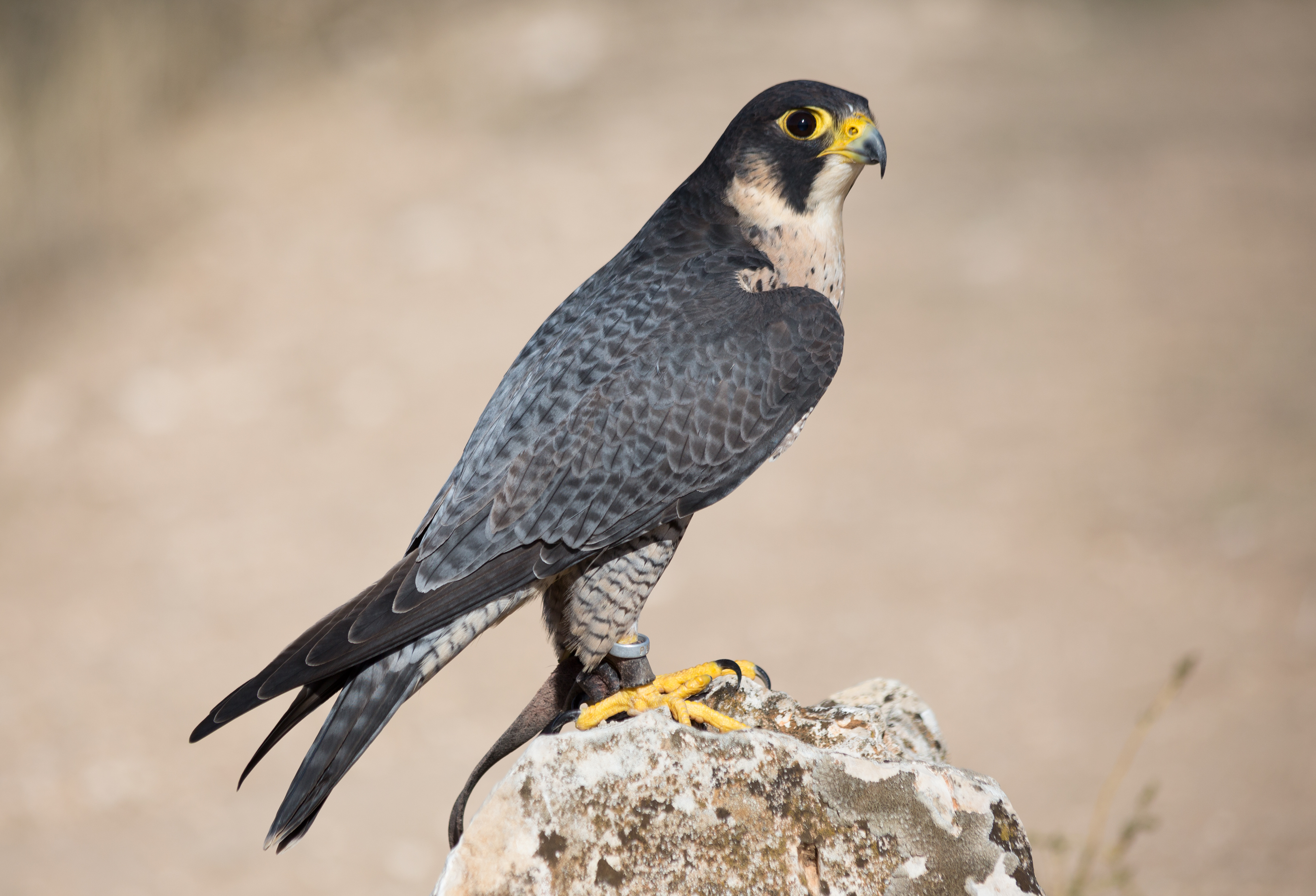
Peregrine falcon

Order: Falconiformes Family: Falconidae

Falconidae is a family of diurnal birds of prey. They differ from hawks, eagles and kites in that they kill with their beaks instead of their talons.

- Common kestrel, Falco tinnunculus
- Red-footed falcon, Falco vespertinus (A)
- Merlin, Falco columbarius
- Eurasian hobby, Falco subbuteo (A)
- Gyrfalcon, Falco rusticolus (A)
- Peregrine falcon, Falco peregrinus

== Old World parrots ==
Order: Psittaciformes Family: Psittaculidae

Characteristic features of parrots include a strong curved bill, an upright stance, strong legs, and clawed zygodactyl feet. Many parrots are vividly colored, and some are multi-colored. In size they range from 8 cm (3.1 in) to 1 m (3.3 ft) in length. Old World parrots are found from Africa east across south and southeast Asia and Oceania to Australia and New Zealand.

- Rose-ringed parakeet, Psittacula krameri (I)

== Shrikes ==
Order: Passeriformes Family: Laniidae

Shrikes are passerine birds known for their habit of catching other birds and small animals and impaling the uneaten portions of their bodies on thorns. A typical shrike's beak is hooked, like a bird of prey.

- Red-backed shrike, Lanius collurio (A)
- Isabelline shrike, Lanius isabellinus (A)
- Red-tailed shrike, Lanius phoenicuroides (A)
- Great grey shrike, Lanius excubitor (A)
- Woodchat shrike, Lanius senator (A)

== Vireos, shrike-babblers, and erpornis ==
Order: Passeriformes Family: Vireonidae

The vireos are a group of small to medium-sized passerine birds. They are typically greenish in color and resemble wood warblers apart from their heavier bills.

- Red-eyed vireo, Vireo olivaceus (A)

== Old World orioles ==
Order: Passeriformes Family: Oriolidae

The Old World orioles are colourful passerine birds. They are not related to the New World orioles.

- Eurasian golden oriole, Oriolus oriolus (A)

== Crows, jays, and magpies ==
Order: Passeriformes Family: Corvidae

The family Corvidae includes crows, ravens, jays, choughs, magpies, treepies, nutcrackers and ground jays. Corvids are above average in size among the Passeriformes, and some of the larger species show high levels of intelligence.

- Eurasian jay, Garrulus glandarius
- Eurasian magpie, Pica pica
- Red-billed chough, Pyrrhocorax pyrrhocorax
- Western jackdaw, Corvus monedula
- House crow, Corvus splendens (A)
- Rook, Corvus frugilegus
- Carrion crow, Corvus corone
- Hooded crow, Corvus cornix
- Northern raven, Corvus corax

== Waxwings ==
Order: Passeriformes Family: Bombycillidae

The waxwings are a group of birds with soft silky plumage and unique red tips to some of the wing feathers. In the Bohemian and cedar waxwings, these tips look like sealing wax and give the group its name. These are arboreal birds of northern forests. They live on insects in summer and berries in winter.

- Bohemian waxwing, Bombycilla garrulus

== Tits, chickadees, and titmice ==
Order: Passeriformes Family: Paridae

The Paridae are mainly small stocky woodland species with short stout bills. Some have crests. They are adaptable birds, with a mixed diet including seeds and insects.

- Coal tit, Periparus ater
- Eurasian blue tit, Cyanistes caeruleus
- Great tit, Parus major

== Bearded reedling ==
Order: Passeriformes Family: Panuridae

This species, the only one in its family, is found in reed beds throughout temperate Europe and Asia.

- Bearded reedling, Panurus biarmicus

== Larks ==
Order: Passeriformes Family: Alaudidae

Larks are small terrestrial birds with often extravagant songs and display flights. Most larks are fairly dull in appearance. Their food is insects and seeds.

- Woodlark, Lullula arborea (A)
- Eurasian skylark, Alauda arvensis
- Horned lark, Eremophila alpestris (A)
- Greater short-toed lark, Calandrella brachydactyla (A)

== Swallows ==
Order: Passeriformes Family: Hirundinidae

The family Hirundinidae is adapted to aerial feeding. They have a slender streamlined body, long pointed wings and a short bill with a wide gape. The feet are adapted to perching rather than walking, and the front toes are partially joined at the base.

- Sand martin, Riparia riparia
- Barn swallow, Hirundo rustica
- Common house-martin, Delichon urbicum
- Red-rumped swallow, Cecropis daurica (A)

== Long-tailed tits ==
Order: Passeriformes Family: Aegithalidae

Long-tailed tits are a group of small passerine birds with medium to long tails. They make woven bag nests in trees. Most eat a mixed diet which includes insects.

- Long-tailed tit, Aegithalos caudatus

== Leaf warblers ==
Order: Passeriformes Family: Phylloscopidae

Leaf warblers are a family of small insectivorous birds found mostly in Eurasia and ranging into Wallacea and Africa. The species are of various sizes, often green-plumaged above and yellow below, or more subdued with grayish-green to grayish-brown colors.

- Wood warbler, Phylloscopus sibilatrix
- Yellow-browed warbler, Phylloscopus inornatus (A)
- Pallas's leaf warbler, Phylloscopus proregulus (A)
- Radde's warbler, Phylloscopus schwarzi (A)
- Willow warbler, Phylloscopus trochilus
- Common chiffchaff, Phylloscopus collybita

== Reed warblers and allies ==
Order: Passeriformes Family: Acrocephalidae

The members of this family are usually rather large for "warblers". Most are rather plain olivaceous brown above with much yellow to beige below. They are usually found in open woodland, reedbeds, or tall grass. The family occurs mostly in southern to western Eurasia and surroundings, but it also ranges far into the Pacific, with some species in Africa.

- Sedge warbler, Acrocephalus schoenobaenus
- Eurasian reed warbler, Acrocephalus scirpaceus
- Melodious warbler, Hippolais polyglotta (A)
- Icterine warbler, Hippolais icterina (A)

== Grassbirds and allies ==
Order: Passeriformes Family: Locustellidae

Locustellidae are a family of small insectivorous songbirds found mainly in Eurasia, Africa, and the Australian region. They are smallish birds with tails that are usually long and pointed, and tend to be drab brownish or buffy all over.

- Common grasshopper warbler, Locustella naevia

== Sylviid warblers and allies ==
Order: Passeriformes Family: Sylviidae

The family Sylviidae is a group of small insectivorous passerine birds. They mainly occur as breeding species, as the common name implies, in Europe, Asia and, to a lesser extent, Africa. Most are of generally undistinguished appearance, but many have distinctive songs.

- Eurasian blackcap, Sylvia atricapilla
- Garden warbler, Sylvia borin
- Barred warbler, Curruca nisoria (A)
- Lesser whitethroat, Curruca curruca (A)
- Eastern subalpine warbler, Curruca cantillans (A)
- Common whitethroat, Curruca communis

== Kinglets ==
Order: Passeriformes Family: Regulidae

The kinglets, also called crests, are a small group of birds often included in the Old World warblers, but frequently given family status because they also resemble the titmice.

- Firecrest, Regulus ignicapillus
- Goldcrest, Regulus regulus

== Wrens ==
Order: Passeriformes Family: Troglodytidae

The wrens are mainly small and inconspicuous except for their loud songs. These birds have short wings and thin down-turned bills. Several species often hold their tails upright. All are insectivorous.

- Eurasian wren, Troglodytes troglodytes

== Nuthatches ==
Order: Passeriformes Family: Sittidae

Nuthatches are small woodland birds. They have the unusual ability to climb down trees head first, unlike other birds which can only go upwards. Nuthatches have big heads, short tails and powerful bills and feet.

- Eurasian nuthatch, Sitta europaea (A)

== Treecreepers ==
Order: Passeriformes Family: Certhiidae

Treecreepers are small woodland birds, brown above and white below. They have thin pointed down-curved bills, which they use to extricate insects from bark. They have stiff tail feathers, like woodpeckers, which they use to support themselves on vertical trees.

- Eurasian treecreeper, Certhia familiaris

== Starlings ==
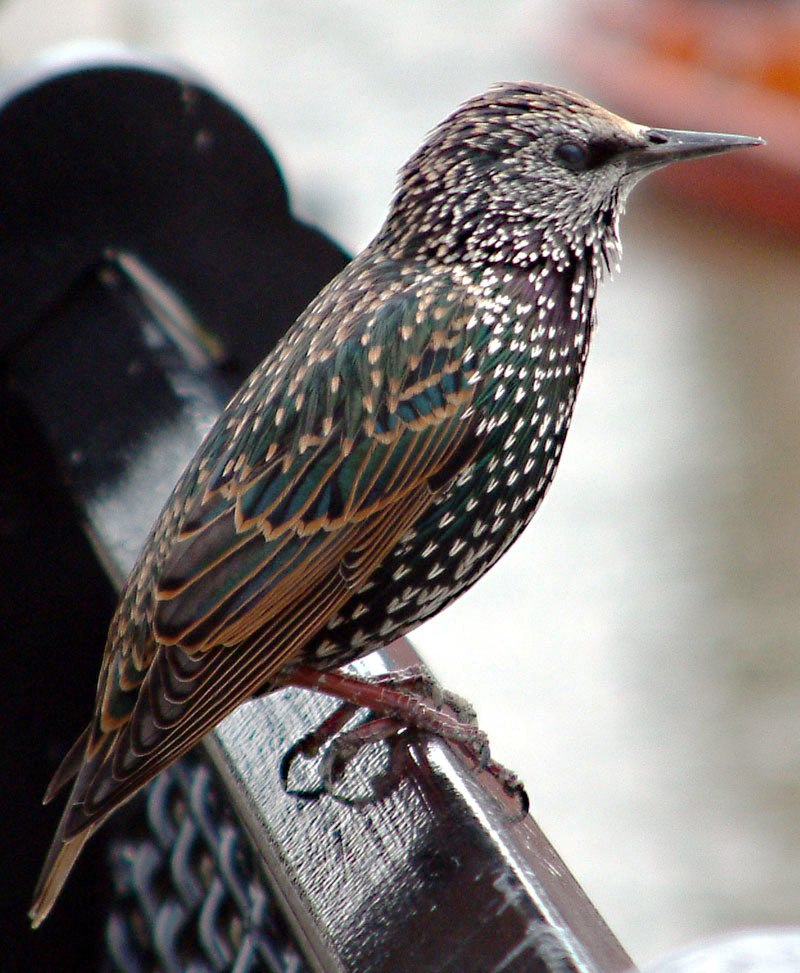
European starling

Order: Passeriformes Family: Sturnidae

Starlings are small to medium-sized Old World passerine birds with strong feet. Their flight is strong and direct and most are very gregarious. Their preferred habitat is fairly open country, and they eat insects and fruit. The plumage of several species is dark with a metallic sheen.

- Rosy starling, Pastor roseus (A)
- Common starling, Sturnus vulgaris

== Thrushes and allies ==
Order: Passeriformes Family: Turdidae

The thrushes are a group of passerine birds that occur mainly in the Old World. They are plump, soft plumaged, small to medium-sized insectivores or sometimes omnivores, often feeding on the ground. Many have attractive songs.

- White's thrush, Zoothera aurea (A)
- Song thrush, Turdus philomelos
- Mistle thrush, Turdus viscivorus
- Redwing, Turdus iliacus
- Common blackbird, Turdus merula
- Fieldfare, Turdus pilaris
- Ring ouzel, Turdus torquatus (A)
- American robin, Turdus migratorius (A)

== Old World flycatchers ==
Order: Passeriformes Family: Muscicapidae

Old World flycatchers are a large group of small passerine birds native to the Old World. They are mainly small arboreal insectivores. The appearance of these birds is highly varied, but they mostly have weak songs and harsh calls.

- Spotted flycatcher, Muscicapa striata
- Asian brown flycatcher, Muscicapa dauurica (A)
- European robin, Erithacus rubecula
- Bluethroat, Luscinia svecica (A)
- Common nightingale, Luscinia megarhynchos (A)
- Red-flanked bluetail, Tarsiger cyanurus (A)
- Red-breasted flycatcher, Ficedula parva
- European pied flycatcher, Ficedula hypoleuca
- Black redstart, Phoenicurus ochruros
- Common redstart, Phoenicurus phoenicurus
- Whinchat, Saxicola rubetra
- European stonechat, Saxicola rubicola
- Northern wheatear, Oenanthe oenanthe

== Dippers ==
Order: Passeriformes Family: Cinclidae

Dippers are a group of perching birds whose habitat includes aquatic environments in the Americas, Europe and Asia. They are named for their bobbing or dipping movements.

- White-throated dipper, Cinclus cinclus

== Old World sparrows ==
Order: Passeriformes Family: Passeridae

Old World sparrows are small passerine birds. In general, sparrows tend to be small, plump, brown or grey birds with short tails and short powerful beaks. Sparrows are seed eaters, but they also consume small insects.

- Eurasian tree sparrow, Passer montanus
- House sparrow, Passer domesticus

== Accentors ==
Order: Passeriformes Family: Prunellidae

The accentors are in the only bird family, Prunellidae, which is completely endemic to the Palearctic. They are small, fairly drab species superficially similar to sparrows.

- Dunnock, Prunella modularis

== Wagtails and pipits ==
Order: Passeriformes Family: Motacillidae

Motacillidae is a family of small passerine birds with medium to long tails. They include the wagtails, longclaws and pipits. They are slender, ground feeding insectivores of open country.

- Western yellow wagtail, Motacilla flava
- Citrine wagtail, Motacilla citreola (A)
- Grey wagtail, Motacilla cinerea
- White wagtail, Motacilla alba
- Richard's pipit, Anthus richardi (A)
- Tawny pipit, Anthus campestris (A)
- Meadow pipit, Anthus pratensis
- Tree pipit, Anthus trivialis (A)
- Red-throated pipit, Anthus cervinus (A)
- Buff-bellied pipit, Anthus rubescens (A)
- Water pipit, Anthus spinoletta (A)
- European rock pipit, Anthus petrosus

== Finches, euphonias, and allies ==
Order: Passeriformes Family: Fringillidae

Finches are seed-eating passerine birds, that are small to moderately large and have a strong beak, usually conical and in some species very large. All have twelve tail feathers and nine primaries. These birds have a bouncing flight with alternating bouts of flapping and gliding on closed wings, and most sing well.

- Common chaffinch, Fringilla coelebs
- Brambling, Fringilla montifringilla
- Hawfinch, Coccothraustes coccothraustes (A)
- Eurasian bullfinch, Pyrrhula pyrrhula
- Common rosefinch, Carpodacus erythrinus (A)
- European greenfinch, Chloris chloris
- Twite, Linaria flavirostris
- Common linnet, Linaria cannabina
- Common redpoll, Acanthis flammea
- Lesser redpoll, Acanthis cabaret
- Crossbill, Loxia curvirostra
- Two-barred crossbill, Loxia leucoptera (A)
- European goldfinch, Carduelis carduelis
- Eurasian siskin, Spinus spinus

== Longspurs and arctic buntings ==
Order: Passeriformes Family: Calcariidae

The Calcariidae are a family of birds that had been traditionally grouped with the New World sparrows, but differ in a number of respects and are usually found in open grassy areas.

- Lapland longspur, Calcarius lapponicus
- Snow bunting, Plectrophenax nivalis

== Old World buntings ==
Order: Passeriformes Family: Emberizidae

The emberizids are a large family of passerine birds. They are seed-eating birds with distinctively shaped bills. Many emberizid species have distinctive head patterns.

- Corn bunting, Emberiza calandra
- Yellowhammer, Emberiza citrinella
- Little bunting, Emberiza pusilla (A)
- Rustic bunting, Emberiza rustica (A)
- Black-headed bunting, Emberiza melanocephala (A)
- Common reed bunting, Emberiza schoeniclus

== New World sparrows ==
Order: Passeriformes Family: Passerellidae

Until 2017, these species were considered part of the family Emberizidae. Most of the species are known as sparrows, but these birds are not closely related to the Old World sparrows which are in the family Passeridae. Many of these have distinctive head patterns.

- Red fox sparrow, Passerella iliaca (A)
- Dark-eyed junco, Junco hyemalis (A)
- White-throated sparrow, Zonotrichia albicollis (A)

== New World warblers ==
Order: Passeriformes Family: Parulidae

The wood-warblers are a group of small often colorful passerine birds restricted to the New World. Most are arboreal, but some are more terrestrial. Most members of this family are insectivores.

- Black-and-white warbler, Mniotilta varia (A)
- Common yellowthroat, Geothlypis trichas (A)

== Cardinals and allies ==
Order: Passeriformes Family: Cardinalidae

The cardinals are a family of robust, seed-eating birds with strong bills. They are typically associated with open woodland. The sexes usually have distinct plumages.

- Scarlet tanager, Piranga olivacea (A)

== See also ==
- List of birds
- Lists of birds by region
