= Red sparrow =

Red sparrow may refer to:

- Red fox sparrow (Passerella iliaca iliaca), a group of subspecies of the North American fox sparrow
- Red Sparrow (novel), a 2013 U.S. spy novel by Jason Matthews
- Red Sparrow, a 2018 U.S. spy film based on the eponymous novel
- Red Sparowes, a U.S. post-rock band
- Red Sparrow, a fictional character created by Charles Bukowski from the 1994 novel Pulp
- Red Sparrow, a 2010 play by Manav Kaul

== See also ==
- Red (disambiguation)
- Sparrow (disambiguation)
