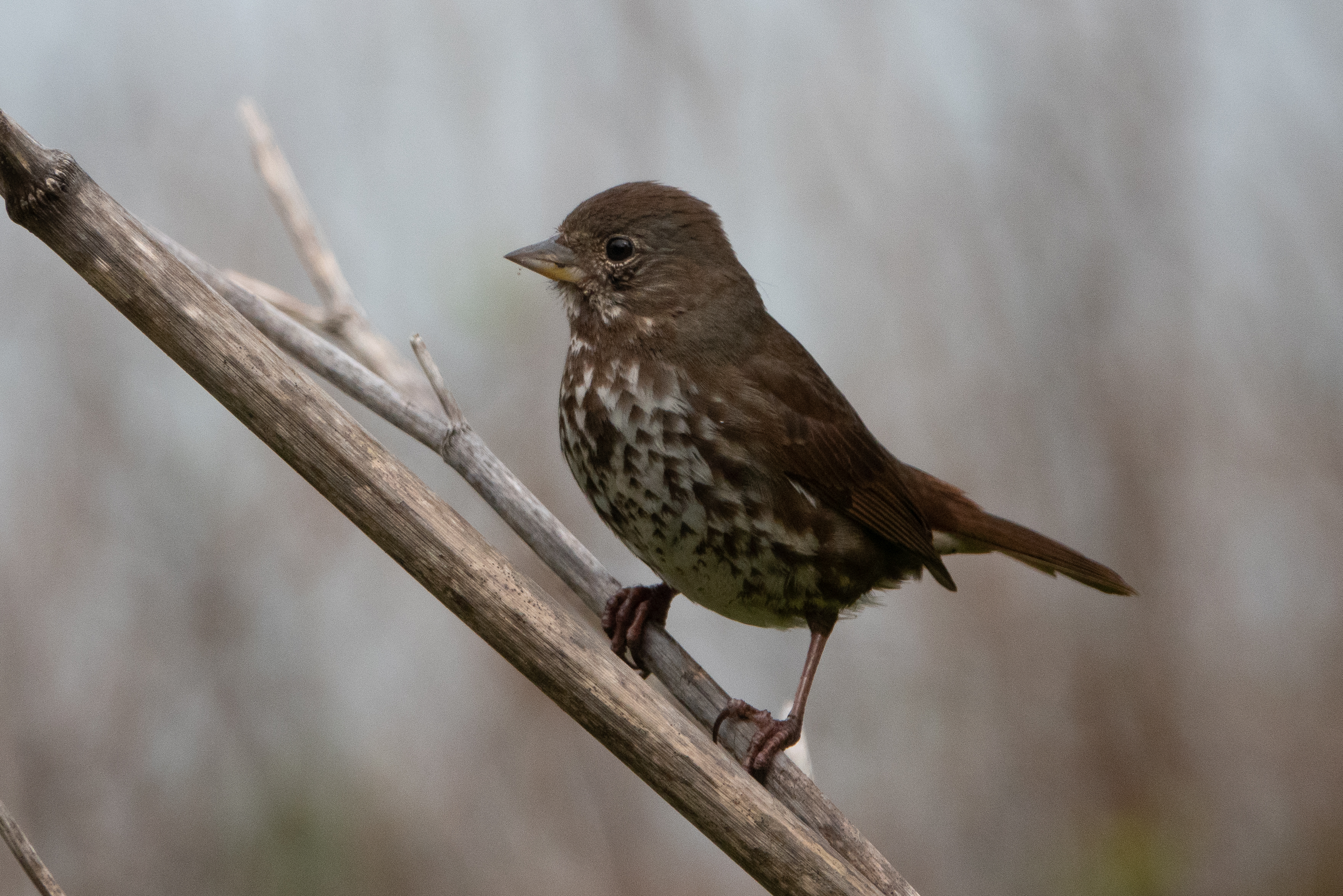

Scientific classification
- Kingdom: Animalia
- Phylum: Chordata
- Class: Aves
- Order: Passeriformes
- Family: Passerellidae
- Genus: Passerella
- Species: P. iliaca
- Subspecies: P. i. unalaschcensis

Trinomial name
- Passerella iliaca unalaschcensis (Gmelin, 1789)
- Breeding Year-round Nonbreeding

= Sooty fox sparrow =

Subspecies of bird

The sooty fox sparrow (Passerella (iliaca) unalaschcensis) contains the darkest-colored taxa in the genus Passerella. It is currently classified as a "subspecies group" within the fox sparrow pending wider-spread acceptance of species status. It has long been suspected to be a separate evolutionary lineage due to morphological distinctness (Swarth 1920), and this is confirmed by analysis of mtDNA sequence and haplotype data (Zink 1994, Zink & Kessen 1999, Zink & Weckstein 2003). This group appears to be most closely related to the thick-billed and/or slate-colored fox sparrows (Zink 1996, Zink & Weckstein 2003).

== Description ==
The sooty fox sparrow complex varies clinally in intensity of color. The upperparts and head are a variable shade of brown, with streaks on the underparts of the same color. The northernmost birds are a sandy brown, while southernmost birds are a dark coffee-like color. Sooties prefer to breed in willows and alders at the edge of wet habitats. Beadle & Rising (2003) describe their call note as a sharp zitt or thik, while Sibley (2000) says it is a loud smack like that of the red fox sparrow.

== Subspecies ==
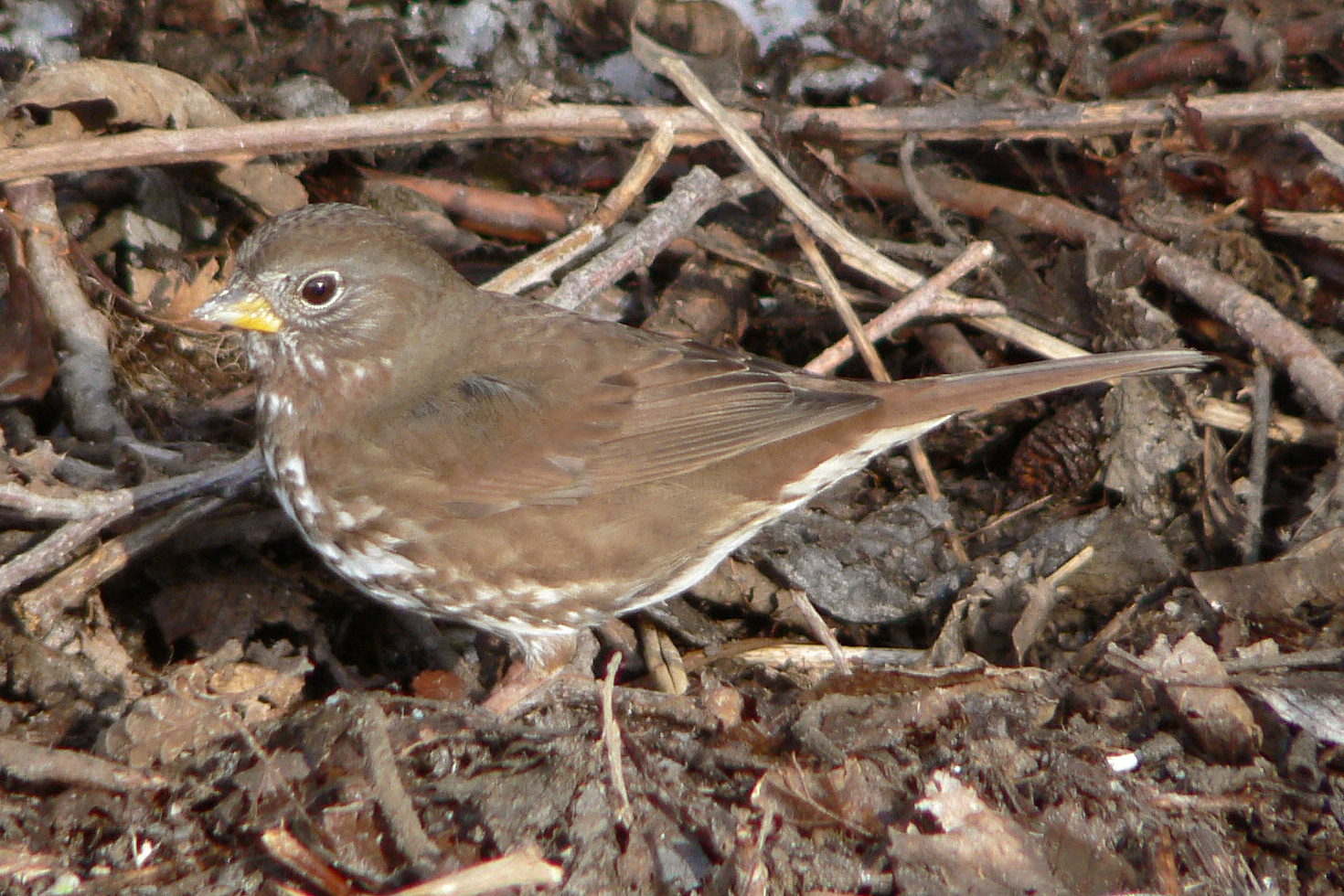
sandy brown variety

Six subspecies are usually recognized in the sooty fox sparrow complex, ranging from unalaschensis in the Aleutians to fuliginosa in extreme northwestern Washington:

- unalaschcensis (Gmelin, 1789):

Breeds from Unalaska Island (Aleutian Islands) to the Shumagin and Semidi Islands and adjacent Alaska Peninsula. Winter range from south British Columbia to southernmost California, rarely even further south. (Weckstein et al. 2002)
There are two distinct groups known from the winter range: brownish ash-gray birds with a longer and more pointed bill, and darker lead-gray birds with thicker, blunter bills; the taxonomic significance of this is unknown (Weckstein et al. 2002). Seems to intergrade with sinuosa and insularis where their ranges meet. (Swarth 1920)

- townsendi (Audubon, 1838):

Breeds along the Pacific Coast from Glacier Bay to Haida Gwaii. Winter range south of breeding range, to central California. (Weckstein et al. 2002)
Much darker and more rufous than unalaschcensis, with conspicuously larger and more plentiful breast spots similar to fuliginosa (Swarth 1920).

- fuliginosa Ridgway, 1899:

Breeds on the mainland south from the Stikine River to northwestern Washington. Winter range from southwestern British Columbia south to coastal central California. (Weckstein et al. 2002)
Darker and sootier than townsendi, with the largest and most plentiful breast spots (Weckstein et al. 2002).

- annectens Ridgway, 1900:

Breeds along the Pacific Coast from northern Yakutat Bay to Cross Sound. Winter range coastal central California.(Weckstein et al. 2002)
Intermediate between sinuosa and townsendi (Swarth, 1920). Morphology and range suggest its validity should be checked.

- insularis Ridgway, 1900:

Breeding limited to Kodiak Island. In winter, found along the Pacific Coast southwards to southernmost California.(Weckstein et al., 2002)
Brighter and more uniformly ruddy above, with strong and rich brown breast spots; under tail-coverts tinged buff (Weckstein et al. 2002).

- sinuosa Grinnell, 1910:

Breeds around Prince William Sound and the Kenai Peninsula and on Middleton Island. In winter, south along Pacific slope of southern California. (Weckstein et al. 2002)
Intermediate between unalaschcensis and insularis, but bill markedly more slender than in either (Weckstein et al. 2002).

- chilcatensis Webster, 1983:

The "non-typical fuliginosa" of Swarth (1920), breeding between the Chilkat River area to Stewart and surroundings (British Columbia), and wintering along the coast, mainly between Oregon and the San Francisco Bay region (Weckstein et al., 2002).
Much like fuliginosa, but duller and shorter-tailed. Not usually accepted as distinct by recent reviewers (e.g., Zink 1994, Rising & Beadle 1996, Zink & Kessen 1999), although the presence of similarly distinct birds in unalaschcensis suggests the matter warrants more research.
