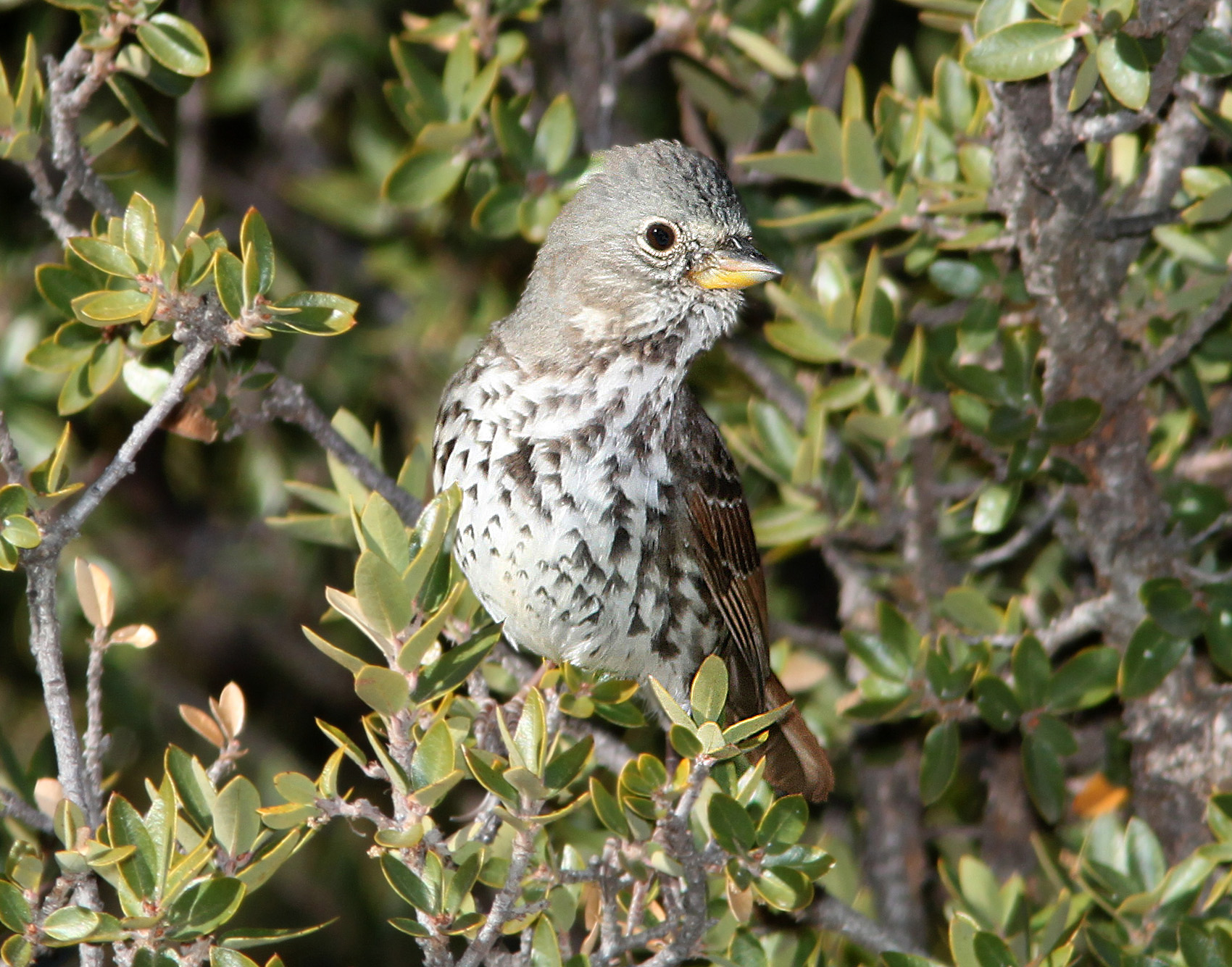

Scientific classification
- Kingdom: Animalia
- Phylum: Chordata
- Class: Aves
- Order: Passeriformes
- Family: Passerellidae
- Genus: Passerella
- Species: P. iliaca
- Subspecies: P. i. schistacea

Trinomial name
- Passerella iliaca schistacea Baird, 1858
- Breeding Migration Nonbreeding

= Slate-colored fox sparrow =

Subspecies of bird

The slate-colored fox sparrow (Passerella (iliaca) schistacea) group comprises the Rocky Mountain taxa in the genus Passerella. It is currently classified as a "subspecies group" within the fox sparrows pending a more-thorough genetic assay of all forms.

It has long been suspected to be a separate evolutionary lineage due to morphological distinctness (Swarth 1920). More recently, it has been split into the present clade and the thick-billed fox sparrow. These have quite similar plumage, but can be readily distinguished according to mtDNA sequence and haplotype data (Zink 1994). However, these results were considered tentative (Rising & Beadle 1996) until more molecular data and apparent lack of wide-ranging hybridization coupled with ecological differences and adaptations led to confirmation of their distinctiveness (Zink & Kessen 1999); this group appears to be most closely related to the red fox sparrows (Zink & Weckstein 2003 contra Zink 1996), judging from biogeography.

It breeds in relatively short willow habitats in montane regions from the interior of northwest British Columbia to Nevada and eastern California (Rising & Beadle 1996). It is a tiny-billed bird with a gray head and mantle, brown wings, brown breast streaks, and a russet tail.

== Subspecies ==
Like all "fox sparrow" subspecies, it is differentiated into some morphologically recognizable allopatric populations, which are still genetically indistinguishable due to their recent evolution (Zink 1994).

However, the handful or so of subspecies in this complex are poorly differentiated even morphologically for the most part; a two-subspecies arrangement recognizing the rather distinctive altivagans (the northern form) as distinct from the southern populations (schistacea) might be more reasonable (Rising & Beadle 1996). As with red and sooty fox sparrows, slate-coloreds also prefer to build their nests on the edges of wet habitat but are much less picky about in which plant they build. Their call note is a sharp klink according to Rising & Beadle (1996), or "a sharp smack, like Sooty and Red populations" according to Sibley (2000).

- schistacea Baird, 1858:

Breeding range is patchy, generally due to the patchiness of appropriate habitat in a montane matrix: short willow riparian habitat with little gradient. Breeds from Crowsnest Pass (British Columbia) and Waterton Lakes Park (southwest Alberta) south through the Great Basin mountain ranges. It ranges as far as northern Nevada (Humboldt County, Elko County), Wyoming, Colorado, and just into northern New Mexico. Moves coastwards in winter, occurring mainly in southern California.(Weckstein et al. 2002)
The nominate subspecies of the group, its head and back are slate gray, with a brown wash on the back. Wings, rump, tail, crown and underside spotting are a rich darkish brown, somewhat more rusty on the tail (Rising & Beadle 1996).

- altivagans Riley, 1911:

Breeds inland from central British Columbia to the area of Crowsnest Pass. In winter, mainly in the Cascade Range and Sierra Nevada, California, and coastal areas to the southwest of this south to northernmost Mexico. (Weckstein et al. 2002)
Overall similar to schistacea, but back noticeably brown and wings and tail with pronounced rusty wash. Altogether, intermediate between schistacea and the eastern fox sparrow (P. (iliaca) iliaca) in morphology, but well distinguished from the latter by vocal and molecular characters (Rising & Beadle 1996). Considerable variation in this population suggests some hybridization with the sooty fox sparrow subspecies fuliginosa and the Yukon fox sparrow subspecies zaboria, as well as intergradation with schistacea (around Banff) and the doubtfully distinct olivacea (Weckstein et al. 2002).

- canescens Swarth, 1918:

Breeds in mountain ranges in central Nevada, notably the Shoshone Mountains and the Toiyabe and Monitor Ranges, and the White Mountains, California. Winters in the California-Arizona-Mexico border area.(Weckstein et al. 2002)
Similar to schistacea sensu stricto and doubtfully distinct from it; somewhat grayer overall (Rising & Beadle 1996).

- olivacea Aldrich, 1943:

Breeds from the Nelson area (British Columbia) south along the eastern slopes of the Cascade Range probably to northern Idaho and northwestern Montana, reaching east as far as the Blue Mountains of Oregon. In winter, migrates to California (Tehama County, Piute Mountains) and the Sierra Juárez in northern Mexico.(Weckstein et al. 2002)
Doubtfully distinct from schistacea sensu stricto (Rising & Beadle 1996). Intermediate between this form and the fulva thick-billed fox sparrows; darker and browner than the first, and brown olive- rather than red-tinged; bill small as in schistacea with which it intergrades. (Weckstein et al. 2002)

- swarthi Behle & Selander, 1951:

Breeds from Bannock County and Bear Lake County, Idaho, through mountain ranges in Utah south to Sanpete County. Winter range unknown. (Weckstein et al. 2002)
A very gray form with heavy breast pattern, but as it apparently intergrades with schistacea and canescens (Weckstein et al. 2002) doubtfully distinct from the former (Rising & Beadle 1996).
