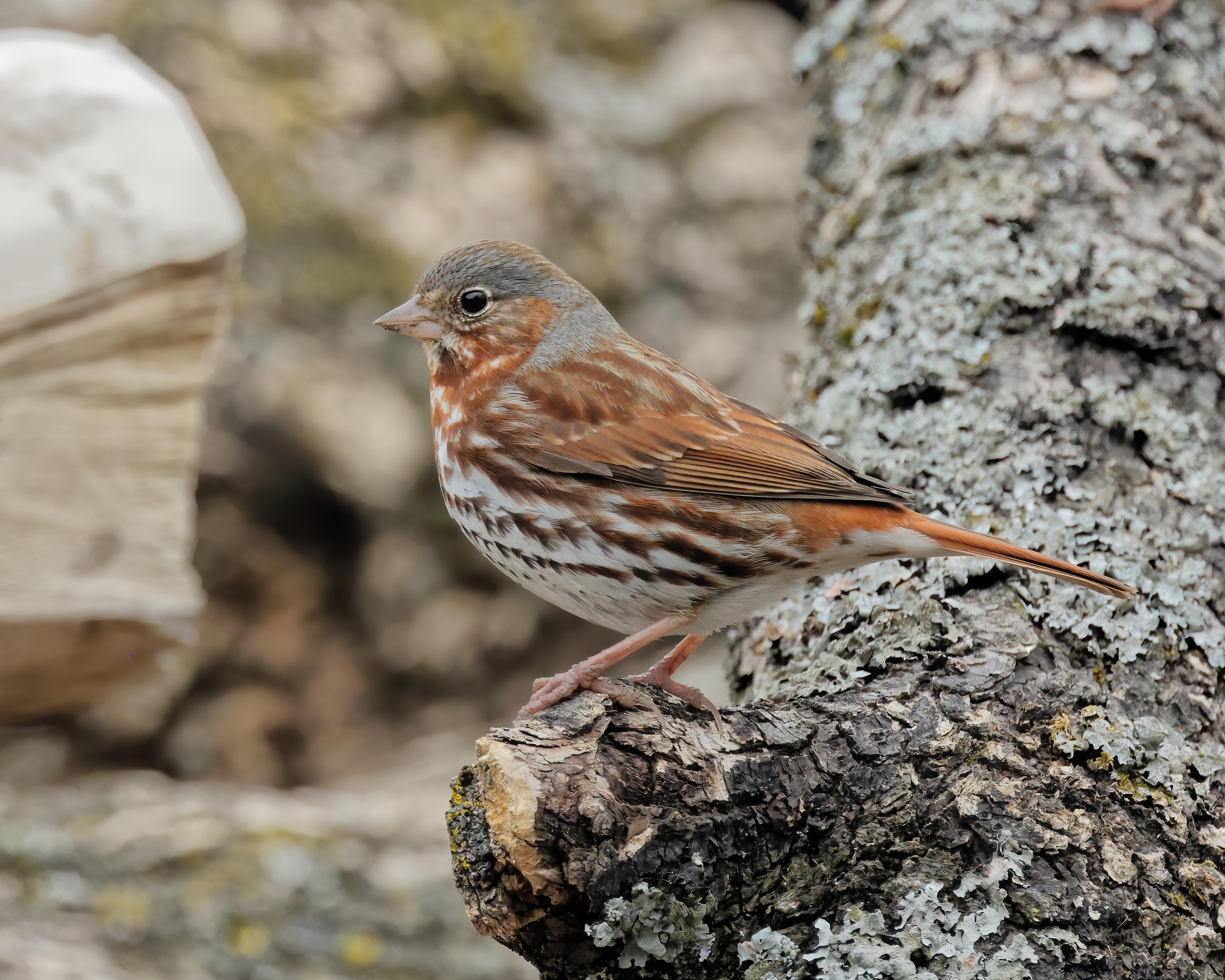
- Passerella iliaca iliaca, in Quebec

Conservation status
- Least Concern (IUCN 3.1)

- Secure (NatureServe)

Scientific classification
- Kingdom: Animalia
- Phylum: Chordata
- Class: Aves
- Order: Passeriformes
- Family: Passerellidae
- Genus: Passerella; Swainson, 1837
- Species: P. iliaca

Binomial name
- Passerella iliaca (Merrem, 1786)
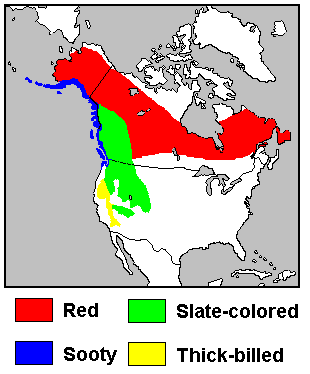
- Breeding ranges of the four fox sparrow groups

= Fox sparrow =

Species of bird

The fox sparrow (Passerella iliaca) is a large New World sparrow. It is the only member of the genus Passerella, although some authors split the species into four (see below).

== Taxonomy ==
Major taxonomic authorities currently differ in their treatment of the fox sparrow complex. The IOC World Bird List/Birds of the World: Recommended English Names and the HBW and BirdLife International Illustrated Checklist of the Birds of the World treat each of the four subspecies groups as a separate species, while eBird/The Clements Checklist of Birds of the World and The Howard and Moore Complete Checklist of the Birds of the World currently treat the complex as a single species. More specific information regarding plumage is available in the accounts for the various taxa.

Images	Subspecies	Common name	Notes
	P. i. iliaca (Merrem, 1786)	Red fox sparrow	Breeds in the taiga of Canada and Alaska and winters in central and eastern North America. The brightest colored group.
	P. i. unalaschcensis (Gmelin, JF, 1789)	Sooty fox sparrow	Breeds along the Pacific coast of North America from the Aleutian Islands south to northwestern Washington, and winters from southeastern Alaska south to northern Baja California. Browner and darker than the Red fox sparrow.
	P. i. schistacea Baird, SF, 1858	Slate-colored fox sparrow	Breeds in interior western North America and winters to the south and west. Gray head and mantle, brown wings, brown breast streaks, and a russet tail.
	P. i. megarhyncha Baird, SF, 1858	Thick-billed fox sparrow	Mostly restricted to California and Oregon. Similar in coloration to the slate-colored fox sparrow, but features a particularly thick bill.

== Description ==
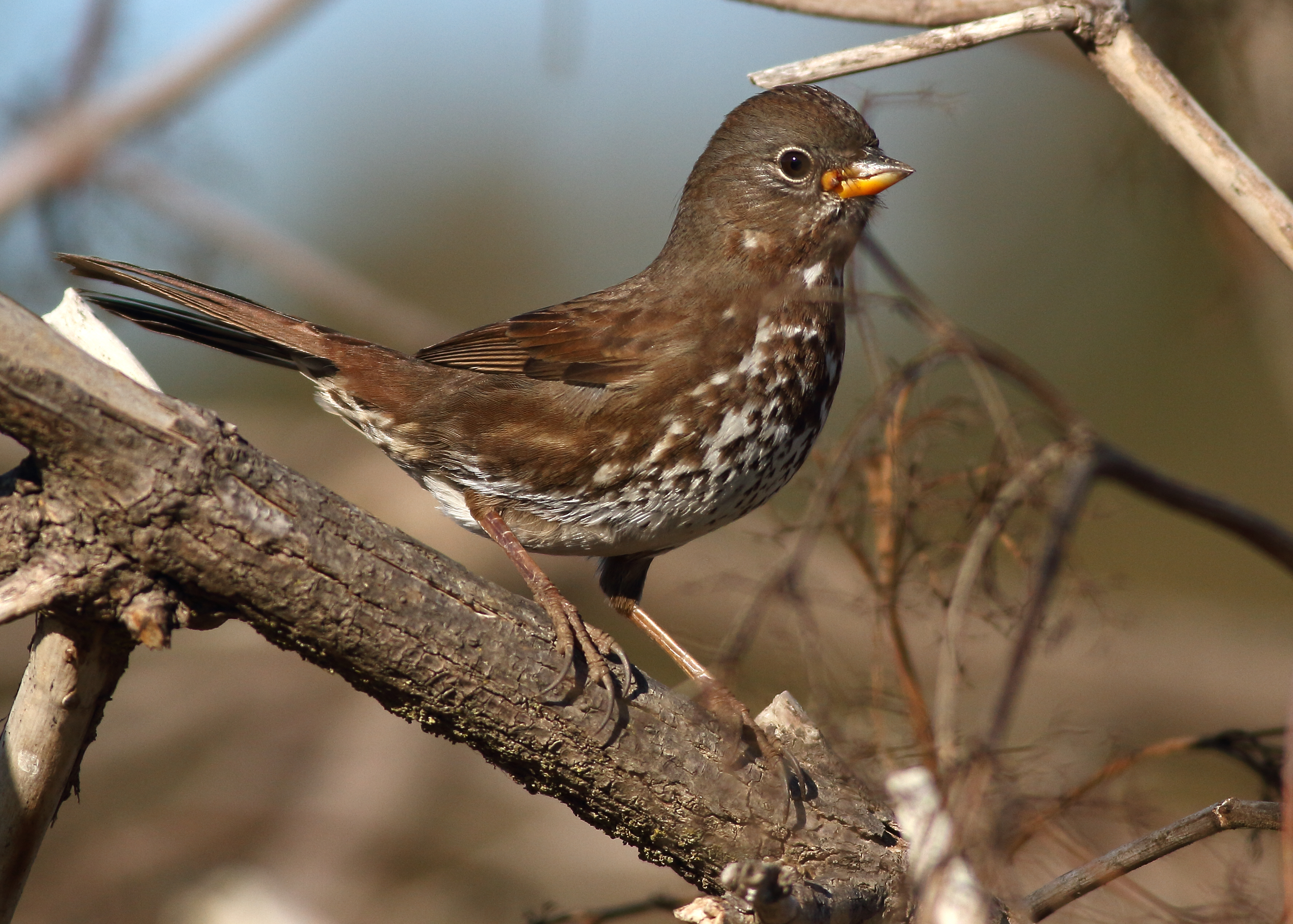
Sooty fox sparrow, Sacramento, California

Adults are among the largest New World sparrows, heavily spotted and streaked underneath. All feature a messy central breast spot though this is less noticeable on the thick billed and slate-colored varieties. Plumage varies markedly from one group to another.

Measurements:

- Length: 15–19 cm (5.9–7.5 in)
- Wingspan: 26.7–29 cm (10.5–11.4 in)
- Weight: 26–44 g (0.92–1.55 oz)

== Behavior ==
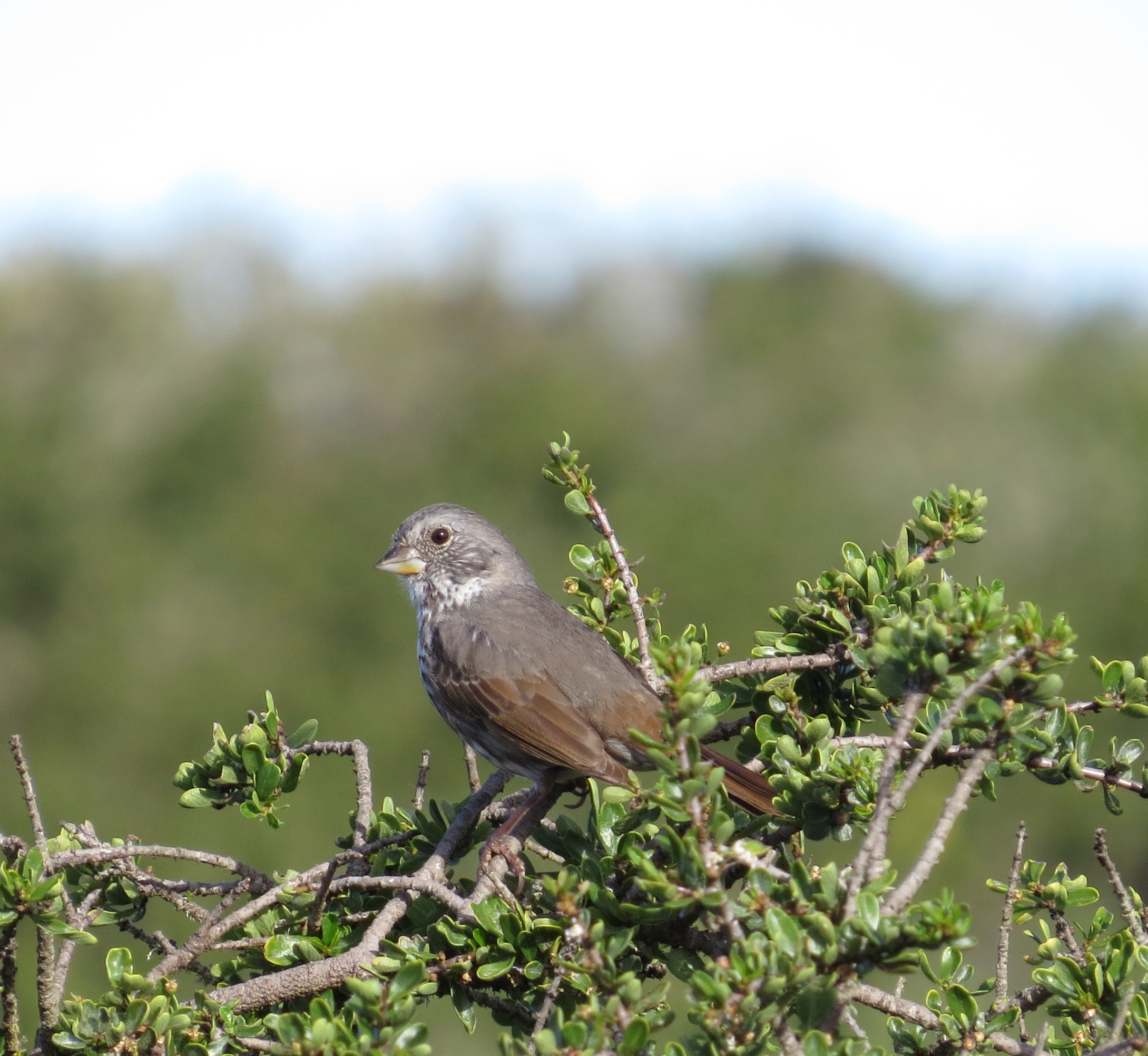
Thick-billed fox sparrow, San Luis Obispo, California

Passerella iliaca call
Call

Fox sparrows are a generally common bird within their range. They forage by scratching the ground which makes them vulnerable to cats and other predators. Most populations of Fox sparrows migrate north for breeding; however, some stable populations exist along the west coast of North America.

=== Diet ===
They mainly eat seeds and insects, as well as some berries. Coastal fox sparrows may also eat crustaceans.

=== Reproduction ===
Fox sparrows nest in wooded areas across northern Canada and western North America from Alaska to California. They nest either in a sheltered location on the ground or low in trees or shrubs. A nest typically contains two to five pale green to greenish white eggs speckled with reddish brown.

== Systematics ==
The review by Zink & Weckstein (2003), which added mtDNA cytochrome b, NADH dehydrogenase subunit 2 and 3, and D-loop sequence, confirmed the four "subspecies groups" of the fox sparrow that were outlined by the initial limited mtDNA haplotype comparison (Zink 1994). These should probably be recognized as separate species, but this was deferred for further analysis of hybridization. Particularly the contact zones between the slate-colored and thick-billed fox sparrows which are only weakly distinct morphologically were of interest; the other groups were found to be distinct far earlier. A further study of the nuclear genome, using microsatellites, showed similar separation between the four groups.

The combined molecular data is unable to resolve the interrelationship of the subspecies groups and of the subspecies in these, but aids in confirming the distinctness of the thick-billed group. Biogeography indicates that the coastal populations were probably isolated during an epoch of glaciation of the Rocky Mountains range, but this is also not very helpful in resolving the remaining problems of within-group diversity, and inter-group relationships.
