= William H. Behle =

American ornithologist (1909–2009)

- Born: May 13, 1909; Salt Lake City, Utah
- Died: February 26, 2009 (aged 99); Salt Lake City, Utah
- Education: UC Berkeley; University of Utah
- Scientific career
- Fields: Ornithology
- Workplaces: University of Utah
- Doctoral advisor: Joseph Grinnell

William Harroun Behle (May 13, 1909 – February 26, 2009) was an American ornithologist from Utah. He published around 140 papers on the biogeography and taxonomy of birds, focusing largely on birds of the Great Basin. Behle was born in Salt Lake City, the second of three children of parents Augustus Calvin Behle, a surgeon, and Daisy May Behle. He studied at the University of Utah, earning a B.A. in 1932 and M.A. in 1933, then pursued doctoral work at the University of California, Berkeley, under Joseph Grinnell, earning a PhD in 1937. Aside from four summers as a naturalist at Grand Canyon National Park, Behle spent the majority of his career as a professor at the University of Utah, where he worked from 1937 until his retirement in 1977, and continued to perform research as professor and curator emeritus. Behle was a fellow of the American Ornithologists' Union and American Association for the Advancement of Science, president (1972–1974) of the Cooper Ornithological Society, and member of the Wilson Ornithological Society. He is commemorated in the scientific name of a tarantula species, Aphonopelma behlei (now considered a synonym of A. marxi) named by his colleague Ralph V. Chamberlin in 1940.

Behle's contributions to ornithology include some 140 papers on bird distribution and taxonomy, and the description of several subspecies (geographic races), including the western purple martin (subspecies Progne subis arboricola) and a race of slate-colored fox sparrow. Behle's 1990 book Utah Birds: Historical Perspectives and Bibliography focused the history of ornithology in Utah from 1776 to modern times, with biographical accounts of collectors and researchers, amateur and professional alike. UC Berkeley professor Ned K. Johnson called it "the most detailed ornithological history of any extensive region of North America."

In 1934, Behle married Dorothy Davis, who died in 2001. William Behle died on February 26, 2009, at the age of 99, survived by two sons.

== Books ==
Behle's books include:

- The Bird Life of Great Salt Lake. Salt Lake City: University of Utah Press. 1958.
- Utah Birds: Historical Perspectives and Bibliography. Salt Lake City: Utah Museum of Natural History, University of Utah. 1990. ISBN 978-0940378117.
- History of Biology at the University of Utah. Salt Lake City: University of Utah Publications and Printing Services. 2002. ISBN 978-0972355209.

== See also ==
- List of birds of Utah
