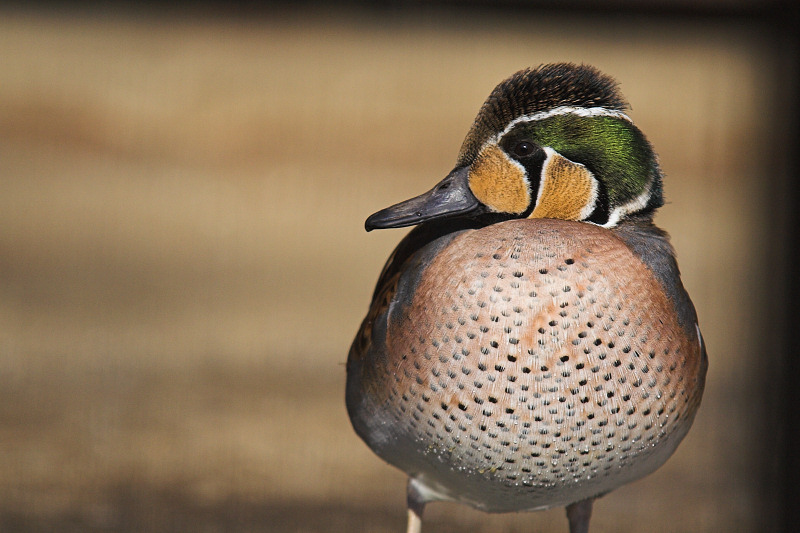
- Baikal teal (Sibirionetta formosa)

Scientific classification
- Kingdom: Animalia
- Phylum: Chordata
- Class: Aves
- Order: Anseriformes
- Family: Anatidae
- Tribe: Anatini
- Genus: Sibirionetta; Boetticher, 1758

Species
- Sibirionetta formosa (Baikal teal); †Sibirionetta formozovi

= Sibirionetta =

Sibirionetta Temporal range: Early Pleistocene - Recent

Genus of birds

Sibirionetta is a genus of dabbling duck which contains two species, an extant species Baikal teal (Sibirionetta formosa) and the fossil species Sibirionetta formozovi from the early Pleistocene of Baikalian Siberia.
