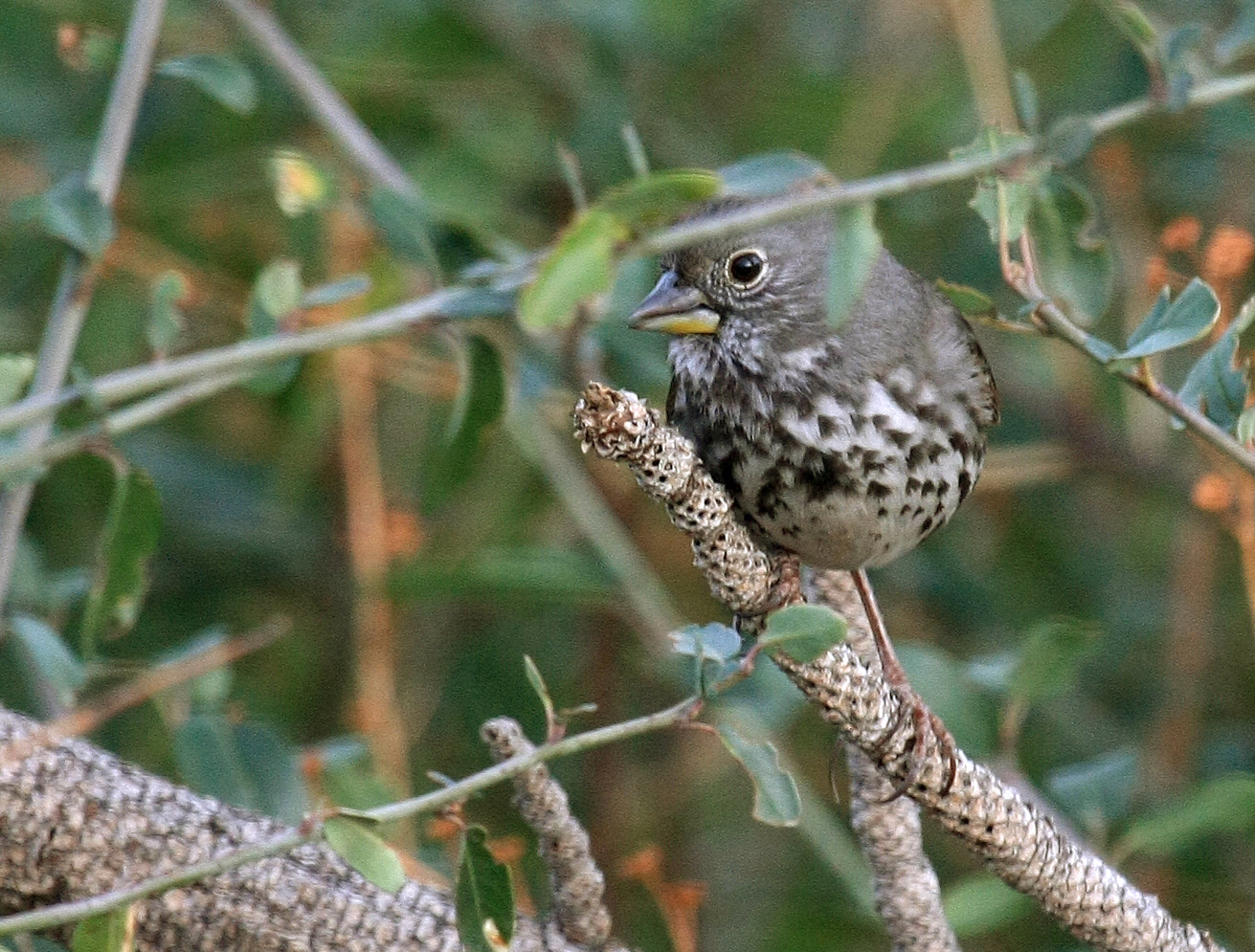

Scientific classification
- Kingdom: Animalia
- Phylum: Chordata
- Class: Aves
- Order: Passeriformes
- Family: Passerellidae
- Genus: Passerella
- Species: P. iliaca
- Subspecies: P. i. megarhyncha

Trinomial name
- Passerella iliaca megarhyncha Baird, 1858
- Breeding Migration Year-round Nonbreeding

= Thick-billed fox sparrow =

Subspecies of bird

The thick-billed fox sparrow (Passerella (iliaca) megarhyncha) group comprises the peculiarly large-billed Sierra Nevadan taxa in the genus Passerella. It is currently classified as a "subspecies group" within the fox sparrow, pending wider-spread acceptance of its species status.

These birds were long considered members of the slate-colored fox sparrow group due to morphological characteristics (Swarth 1920), but according to mtDNA cytochrome b sequence and haplotype data (Zink 1994), it forms a recognizable clade. Research on suspected (Rising & Beadle 1996) hybridization and considering additional DNA sequence data led to confirmation of their distinctiveness (Zink & Kessen 1999); this group appears to be most closely related to the sooty and/or slate-colored fox sparrows. (Zink 1996, Zink & Weckstein 2003)

Thick-billed fox sparrows are almost identical in plumage to slate-colored fox sparrows but have a more extensive blue-gray hood and a less rusty tail. The most striking feature of this bird is its enormous beak which can appear to be three times as large as that of the markedly small-billed slate-colored fox sparrows. A thick-billed fox sparrow's beak also differs in color from that of the slate-colored. Although the culmens of both groups are grayish brown, slate-coloreds have yellow lower mandibles instead of the steel blue of the thick-billeds'. (Rising & Beadle 1996)

== Subspecies ==
The megarhyncha subspecies group breeds in the mountains from southern Oregon to southern California east to the Sierra Nevada and shows little geographic variation. It interbreeds with the slate-colored subspecies group along a narrow contact zone from southern Oregon to western Nevada (Rising & Beadle 1996) but as noted above, gene flow is quite limited. Sibley (2000) indicates that this group has the most diagnostic call note, "a high, flat squeak [sic] teep like California towhee".

- megarhyncha Baird, 1858:

Breeds from the Onion Mountains and Robinson's Butte (southwestern Oregon) south through inland northern California to Kearsarge Pass (Inyo County), as well as the western flank of the Sierra Nevada in Mono County. Winters in central and southern California and adjacent Mexico.(Weckstein et al. 2002)
More larger-billed, duller, and grayer than the schistacea slate-colored fox sparrows; intermediate between the very large long-tailed stephensi and the more schistacea-like monoensis of this group; intergrades with the former.(Weckstein et al. 2002)

- stephensi Anthony, 1895:

Breeds in areas of the southern Sierra Nevada such as Fresno and Tulare Counties, Mount Pinos and the San Gabriel, San Bernardino, and San Jacinto Mountains, California, to the Sierra San Mártir, northern Baja California. In winter, migrates to lower elevations but generally does not migrate long distances. (Weckstein et al. 2002)
The largest, most massive-billed and longest-tailed fox sparrow; also very gray in coloration. (Swarth, 1920) Intergrades with megarhyncha. (Weckstein et al. 2002)

- monoensis Grinnell & Storer, 1917:

Breeds on the eastern flank of the Sierra Nevada in Mono County, California, and in the Walker River Range in adjacent Mineral County, Nevada. Winters from inland central California coastwards and south into Mexico. (Weckstein et al. 2002)
Somewhat intermediate between megarhyncha and schistacea slate-colored fox sparrows, with a paler, ashy gray back. (Weckstein et al. 2002)

- brevicauda Mailliard, 1918:

Breeds in the Mendocino Range of California, from the Yolla Bolly Mountains south to Snow Mountain and Sanhedrin Mountains. Migrates coastwards and south in winter. (Weckstein et al. 2002)
Similar to stephensi, but recognizable by more rusty tinge to brownish areas and the conspicuously shorter tail. (Weckstein et al. 2002)

- fulva Swarth, 1918:

Mountainous regions from central Oregon east of the Cascades Range (Steens Mountain, Sisters and Keeno Mountains) to Modoc and Lassen Counties, California. Winters in southwesternmost California and adjacent Mexico.
A browner version of monoensis; in winter range, distinguished from olivacea slate-colored fox sparrows by decidedly ruddy brown and larger bill. (Weckstein et al. 2002)

- mariposae Swarth, 1918:

Breeding in a limited area in California between the headwaters of the Little Shasta River (Siskiyou County) to Yosemite National Park and Kearsarge Pass. Winter range undocumented (Weckstein et al., 2002) due to lack of distinctiveness but probably same as megarhyncha and monoensis.
Probably nothing more than an intergrade between megarhyncha and monoensis; nowadays usually synonymized with the former. (Rising & Beadle 1996)
