= Sibirionetta formozovi =

Sibirionetta formozovi Temporal range: Early Pleistocene

Scientific classification
- Kingdom: Animalia
- Phylum: Chordata
- Class: Aves
- Order: Anseriformes
- Family: Anatidae
- Genus: Sibirionetta
- Species: †S. formozovi

Binomial name
- †Sibirionetta formozovi Zelenkov et al., 2023

Extinct species of duck

Sibirionetta formozovi is an extinct species of Sibirionetta that lived during the Early Pleistocene.

== Distribution ==
Sibirionetta formozovi is known from Irkutsk Oblast.
