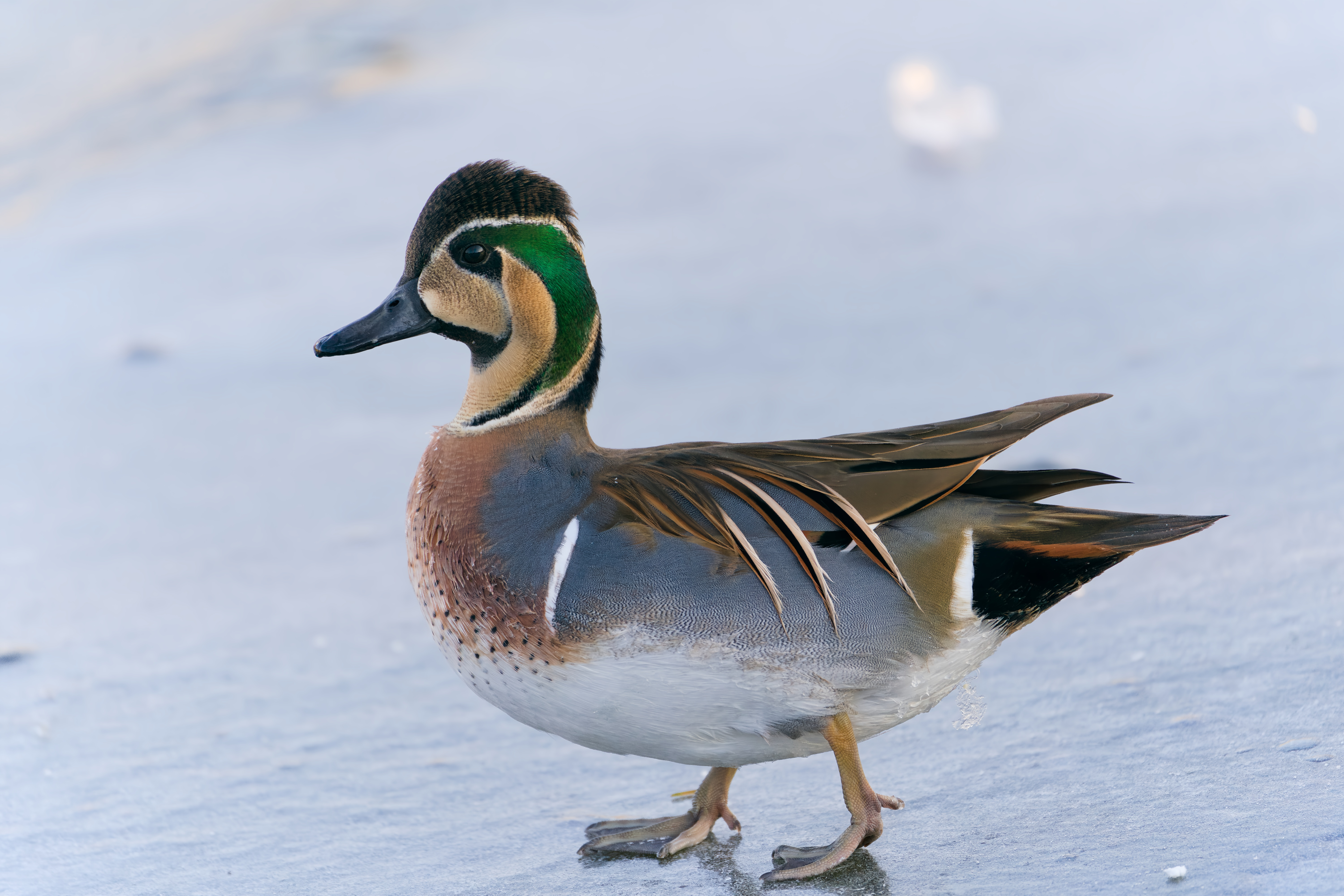
- A male Baikal teal
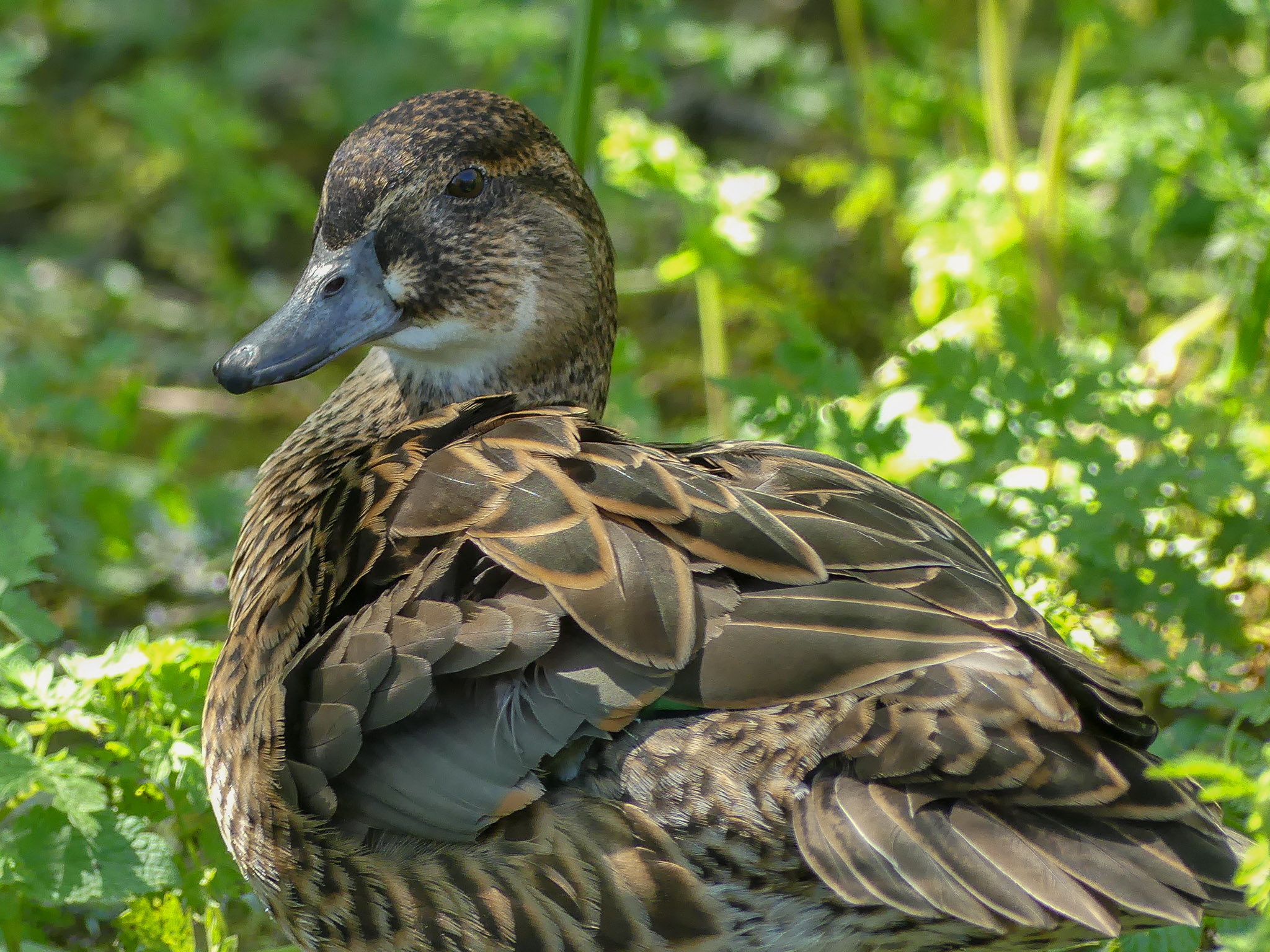
- A female at WWT Arundel, West Sussex

Conservation status
- Least Concern (IUCN 3.1)
- CITES Appendix II

Scientific classification
- Kingdom: Animalia
- Phylum: Chordata
- Class: Aves
- Order: Anseriformes
- Family: Anatidae
- Genus: Sibirionetta
- Species: S. formosa

Binomial name
- Sibirionetta formosa (Georgi, 1775)
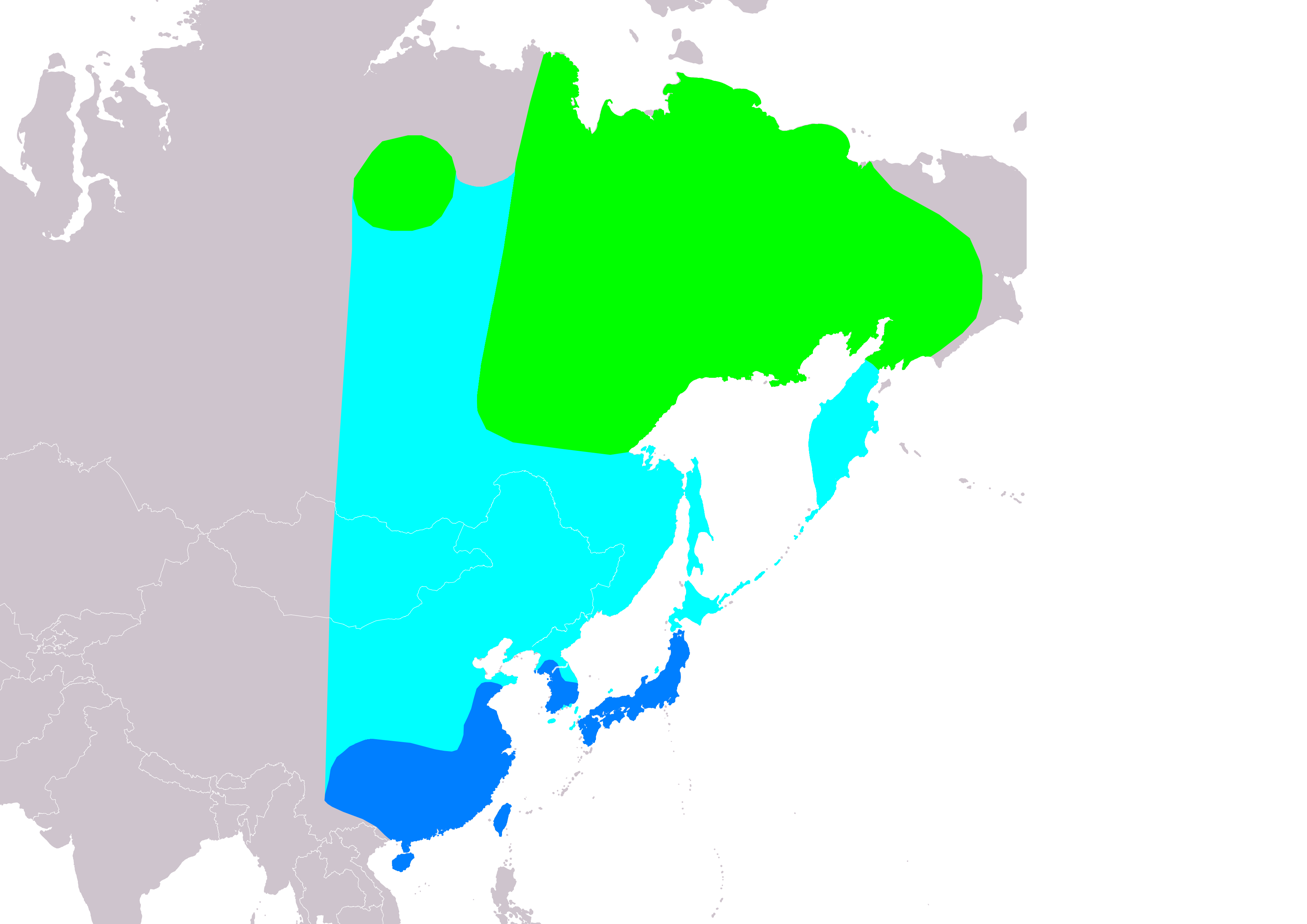
- Range of S. formosa Breeding Passage Non-breeding

Synonyms
- Anas formosa Georgi, 1775

= Baikal teal =

Species of bird

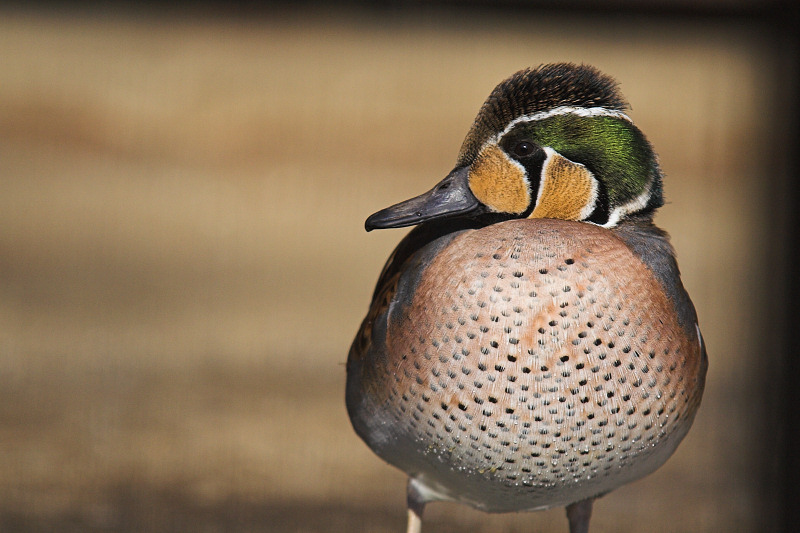
Baikal teal

The Baikal teal (Sibirionetta formosa), also called the bimaculate duck or squawk duck, is a dabbling duck that breeds in eastern Russia and winters in East Asia.

== Taxonomy ==
The first formal description of the Baikal teal was by the German naturalist Johann Gottlieb Georgi in 1775 under the binomial name Anas formosa. A molecular phylogentic study published in 2009 found that the genus Anas as then defined was non-monophyletic. Based on this analysis the genus was split into four proposed genera with the Baikal teal placed in the resurrected genus Sibirionetta that had been introduced by the German zoologist Hans von Boetticher in 1929. The name Sibirionetta is derived from the Latin sibiricus for Siberia and the Ancient Greek nētta for a duck. The specific epithet formosa is from the Latin formosus for "beautiful".

== Description ==
The Baikal teal has a height of 30–40 cm (11.75–15.75 in), and a weighs an average of 500 g (1 lb). At a length between 39–43 cm (15–17 in), this duck is slightly larger and longer-tailed than the common teal. The breeding male is unmistakable, with a striking green nape, yellow and black auriculars, neck, and throat. It has a dark crown, and its breast is light brown with dark spots. Its grey sides are set off on the front and rear with white bars.

The female looks similar to a female green-winged teal but with a longer tail, and a distinctive white spot at the base of the bill and a white throat that angles to the back of the eye. She also has a distinct light eyebrow bordered by a darker crown. The underwing is also similar to the Green-winged Teal, but has a darker leading edge. The green speculum has an indistinct cinnamon-cream inner border. Some "females" have "bridle" markings on their faces, but it has been suggested that at least some of these bridled "females", if not all, are in fact juvenile males. The juvenile has a plumage similar to that of the female and can be distinguished from the Common Teal by the pale loral spot.

In non-breeding (eclipse) plumage, the drake looks more like the female, but plumage is a much richer reddish-brown (rufous) colour.

== Distribution and habitat ==
It breeds within the forest zone of eastern Siberia from the Yenisey basin eastwards to Kamchatka, northern Koryak, eastern Magadan Oblast, northern Khabarovsk Krai, southeastern and northern Sakha east central Irkutsk Oblast, and northern Krasnoyarsk Krai. It is a migratory species, wintering in South Korea, Japan, Taiwan, northern and eastern China, from Beijing down the coast to the Vietnam border, and west to Yunnan, then north to Chongqing and Henan.

It breeds in pools on the tundra edge and within swampy forests. In winter it is found on lowland fresh waters.

== Status ==
This species is classified as Least Concern on the IUCN Red List, though it was classified as Vulnerable before 2011 due to hunting and destruction of its wintering wetland habitats. These threats remain, but the Baikal teal is recovering, with increased numbers of wintering birds and some increase in habitat area. Based on the numbers of Baikal teal counted wintering in South Korea, the global population is estimated to be around 1.07 million individual adults around 2010, a major increase from the tens of thousands counted in the 1980s and few hundreds of thousands in the 2000s.

== Gallery ==
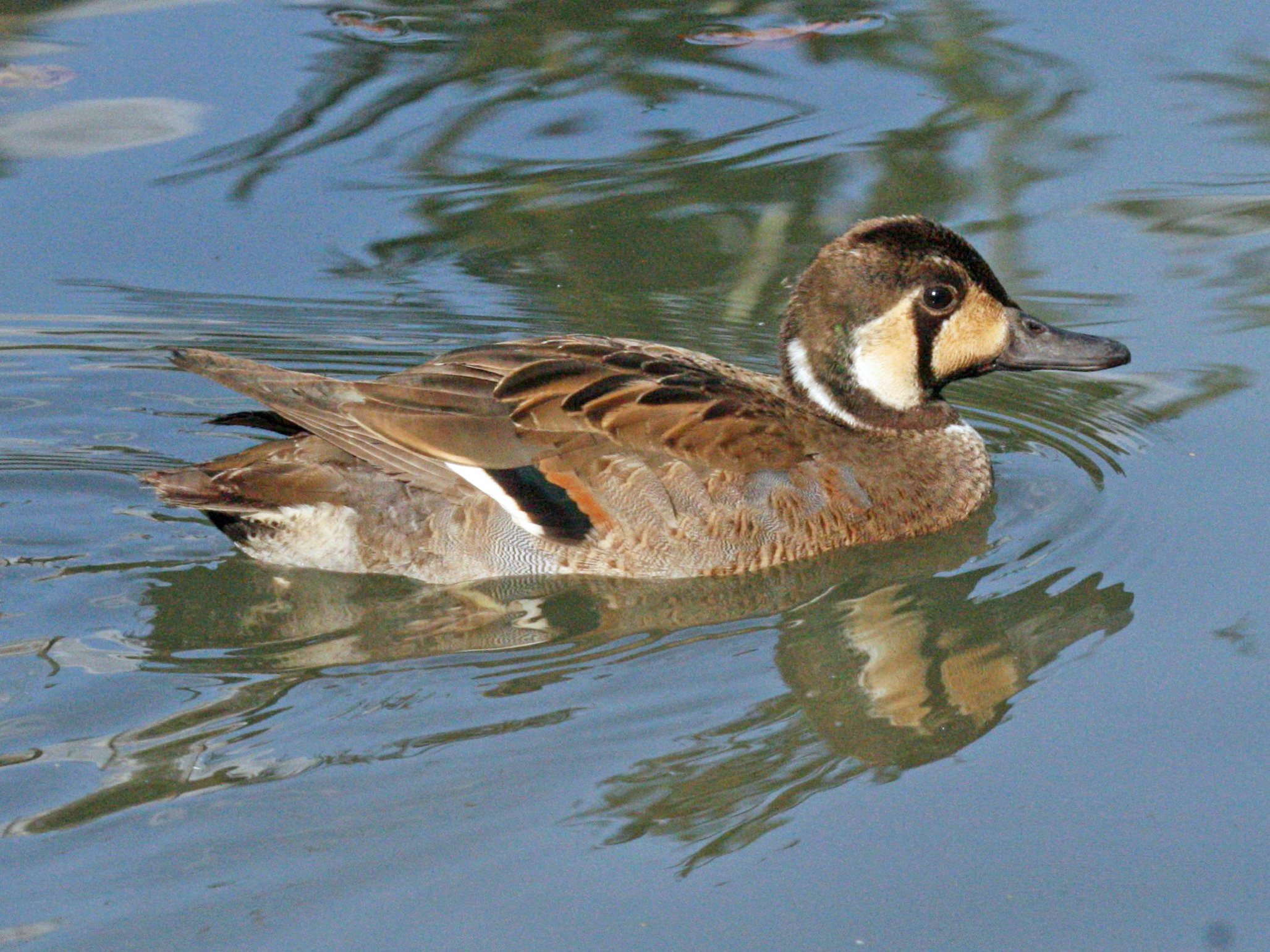

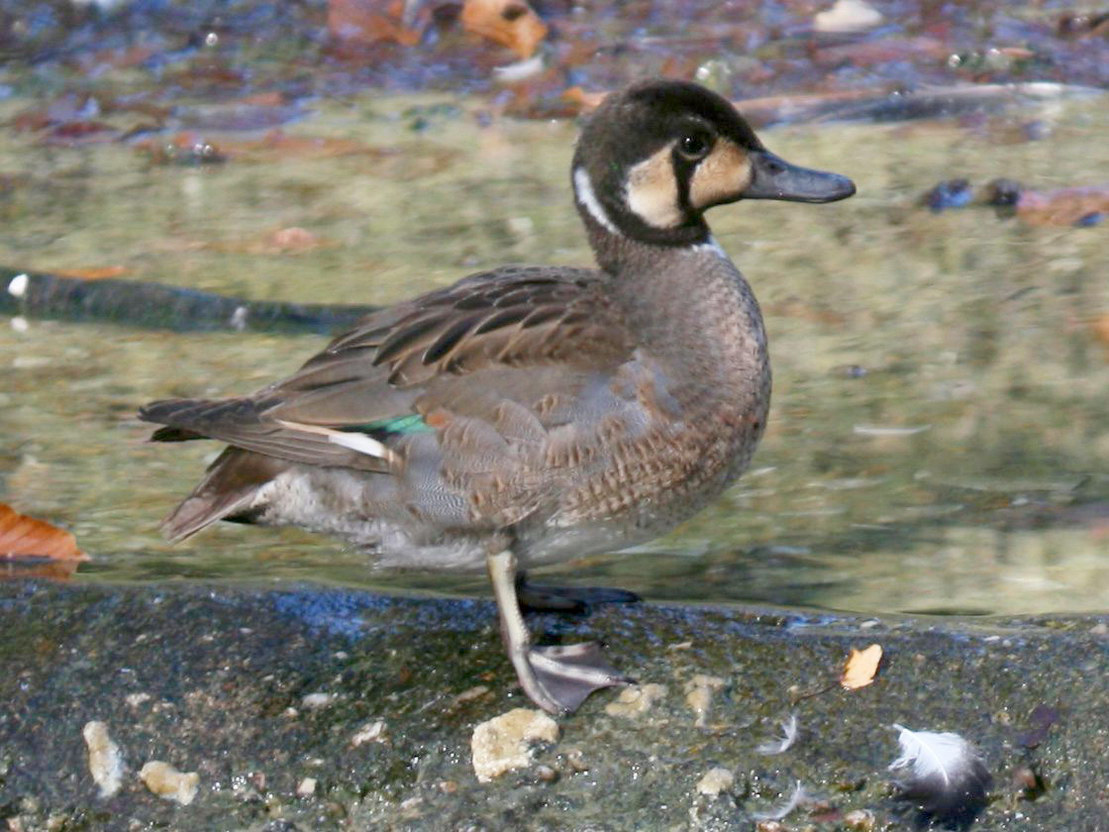

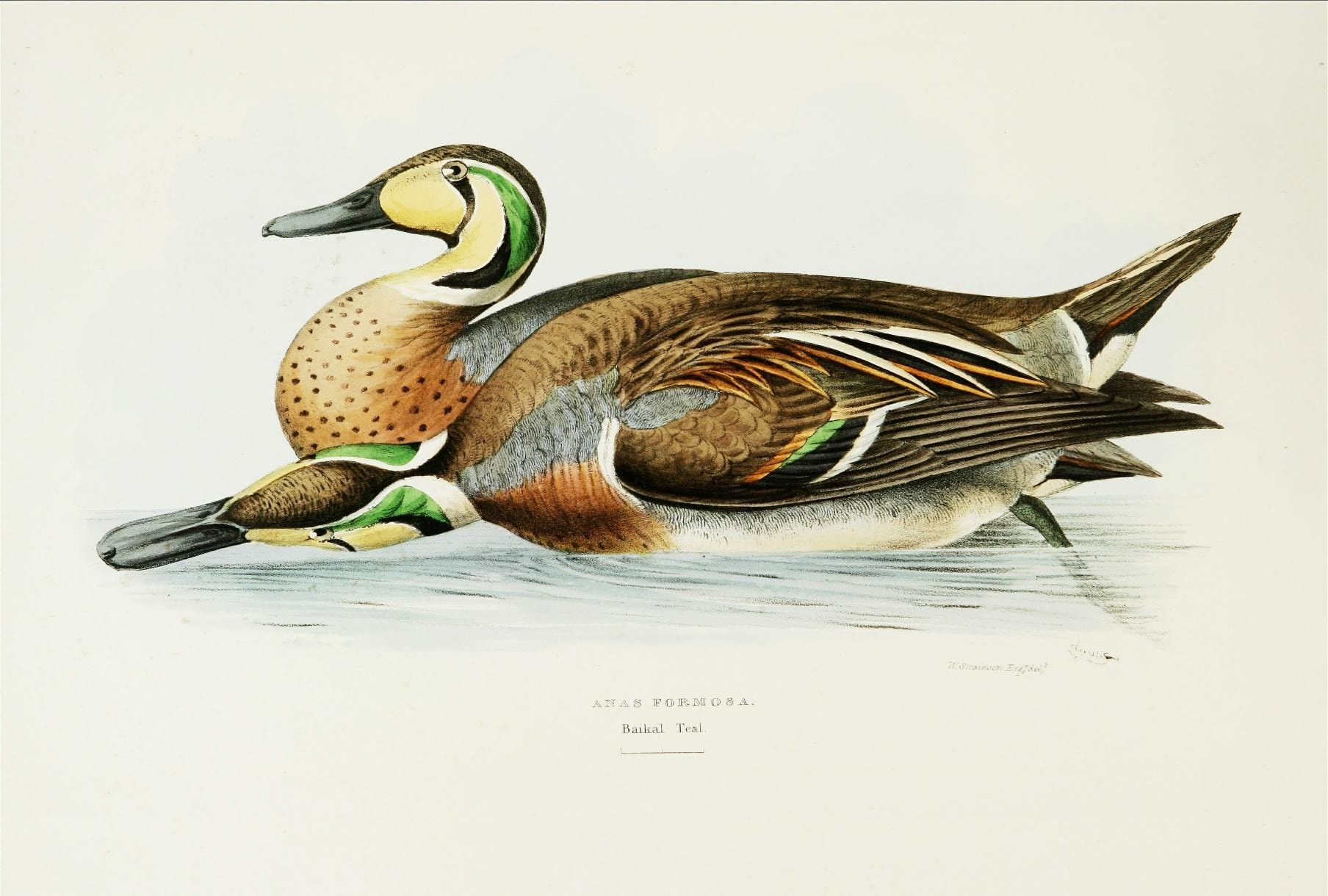
