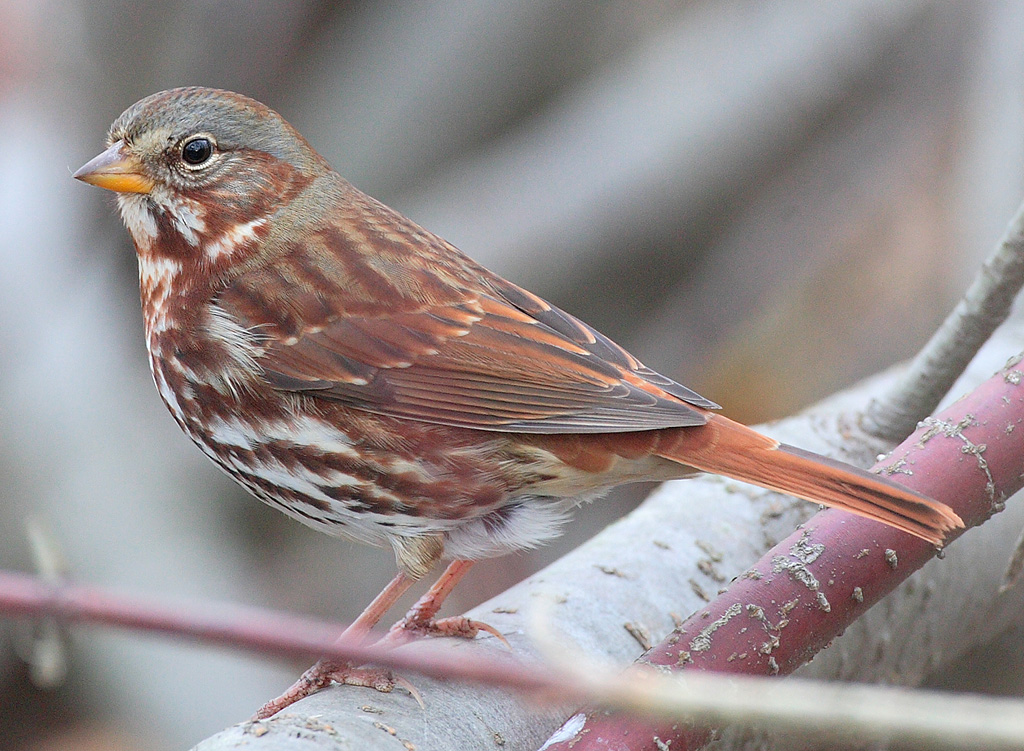
- Probable eastern fox sparrow Passerella iliaca iliaca

Conservation status
- Least Concern (IUCN 3.1)

Scientific classification
- Kingdom: Animalia
- Phylum: Chordata
- Class: Aves
- Order: Passeriformes
- Family: Passerellidae
- Genus: Passerella
- Species: P. iliaca
- Subspecies: P. i. iliaca

Trinomial name
- Passerella iliaca iliaca (Merrem, 1786)

= Red fox sparrow =

Subspecies of bird

Red fox sparrow is the collective name for the most brightly colored taxa in the American sparrow genus Passerella, the Passerella iliaca iliaca group.

== Taxonomy ==
Pending wider-spread acceptance of species status, the red fox sparrow is currently classified as a "subspecies group" within fox sparrows.

It has long been suspected to be a separate evolutionary lineage due to morphological distinctness, and this is confirmed by analysis of mtDNA sequence and haplotype data. This group appears to be most closely related to the slate-colored fox sparrows, but it is altogether likely to represent the basalmost divergence of the fox sparrow clade.

== Description ==
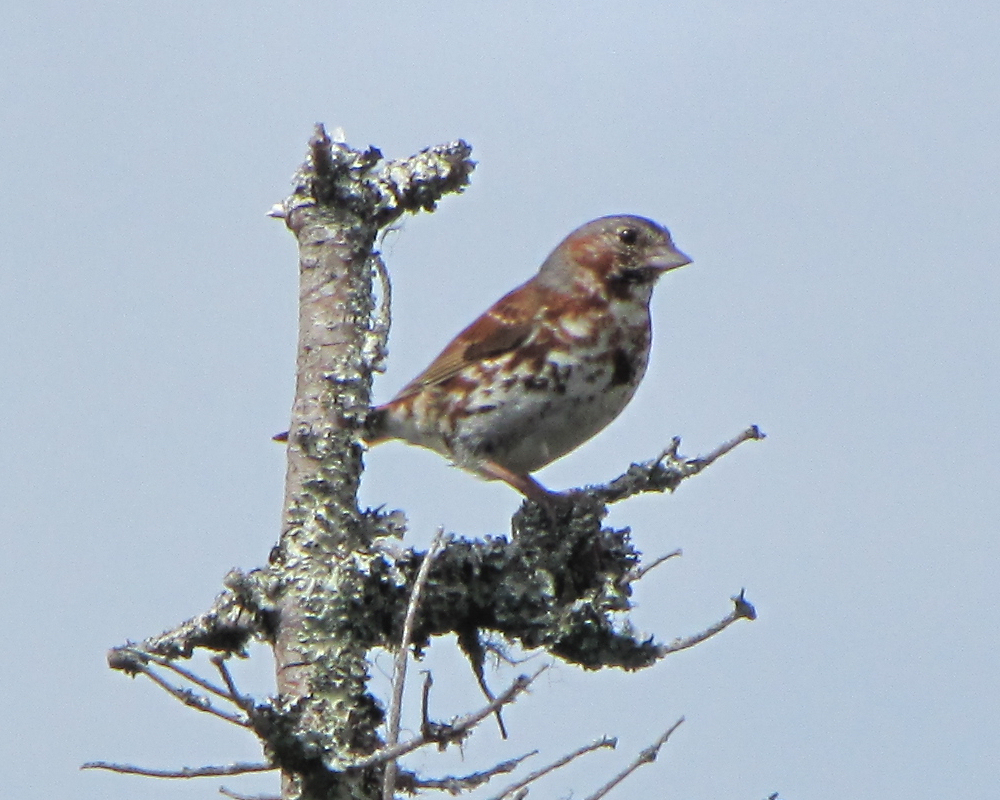
Port Rexton, Newfoundland and Labrador

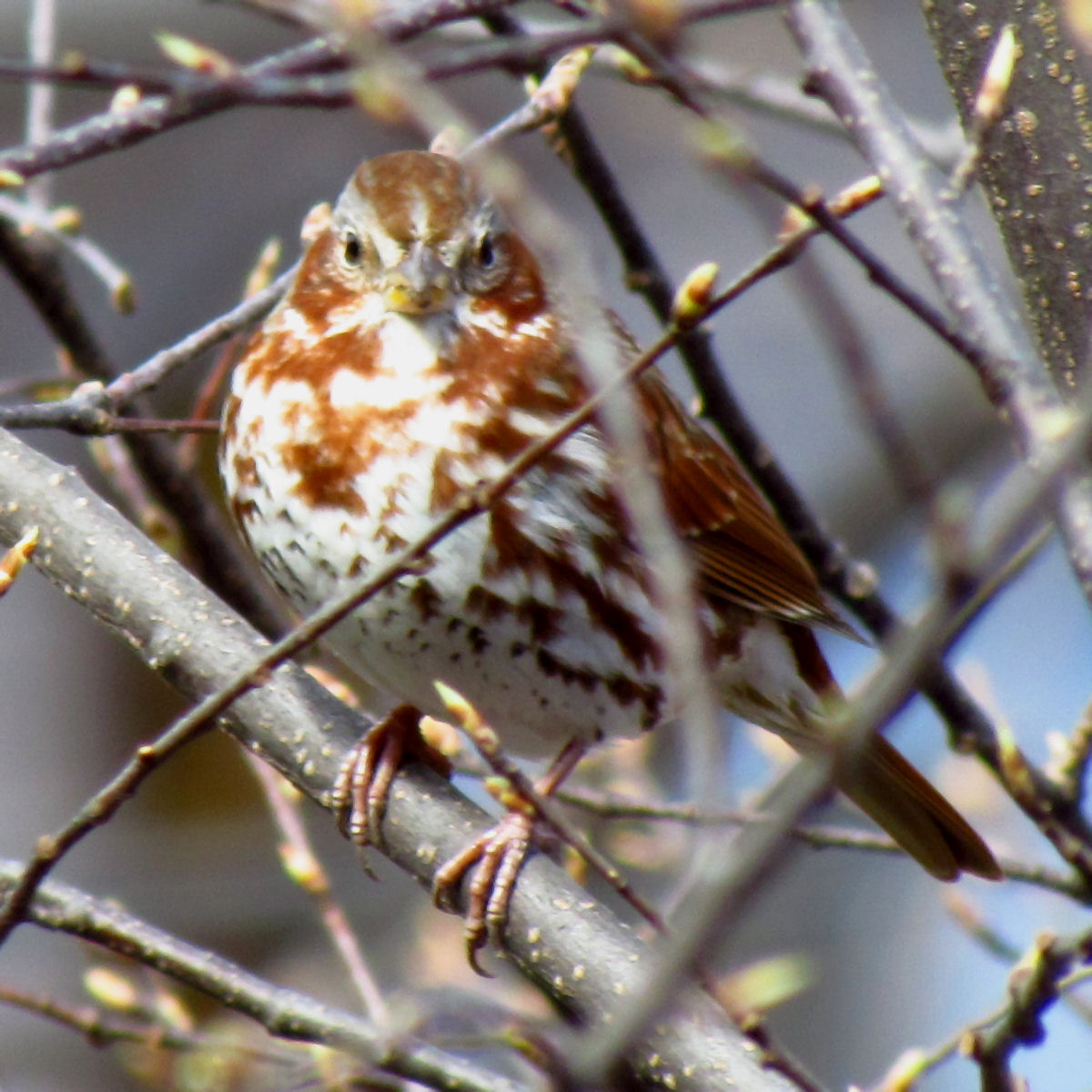
Ottawa, Ontario

The red fox sparrow is a large sparrow with a length of 15–19 cm (6–7.5 in), wingspan of 27 cm (11 in) and an average weight of 32 grams (1.1 ounces). The head is gray with a rufus crown auriculars or ear coverts. Throat is white with a rufus lateral stripe on each side. The lower bill is yellow while the top transitions from yellow at the bottom to black at the top. The breast has reddish brown streaks with a messy central spot. The streaks continue down the flanks but the belly is generally white. The combination of distinct rufus and gray streaks on the back with a gray rump is diagnostic. Sexes are morphologically similar.

=== Vocalization ===
Its voice is described as "a loud smack like Brown Thrasher".

== Behavior ==
=== Reproduction ===
Red fox sparrows breed in a wide band that stretches through mostly taiga habitat, from Newfoundland to northern Alaska. Their preferred breeding habitats are dense willow and alder thickets as well as spruce and fir bogs.

Red fox sparrows may nest on the ground, or in shrubs and trees. They typically nest less than 2 metres off the ground. Clutch consists of 3–5 pale blue to pale green eggs that are thickly spotted with brown. Incubation lasts between 12 and 14 days. The eggs are mostly incubated by the female though both sexes feed the young. Young birds are altricial and fledge in 9 to 11 days.

=== Wintering and migration ===
They winter in temperate and subtropical North America; in the northern United States and southern Canada they often only stop over on their migration further south. The spring migration starts around February, and by early May almost all birds have returned to the breeding grounds. In fall, they start to move south around early October, and by mid-November, only the last stragglers still remain up North.

== Ranges and geographic variation ==
Geographic variation in the iliaca subspecies group is minor compared to individual variation, both in morphology and molecular data samples. The Yukon fox sparrow (Passerella iliaca zaboria) differs from the nominate subspecies, the eastern fox sparrow (Passerella iliaca iliaca) only in having a grayer head and a browner malar stripe on average. The morphological distinction between the subspecies is not pronounced and the birds are not resident all year; therefore positive identification within the red fox sparrow complex is often not possible in the field, at least in some regions.

However, the populations occupy different ranges, apparently—as far as they can be distinguished—with just a small band of overlap. The contact zone is roughly the area between the Nelson and lower Churchill Rivers, Manitoba, in summer. In winter, the Mississippi River and the US states of Alabama and Georgia mark the approximate boundary between the subspecies' ranges. P. i. iliaca occurs from S Wisconsin and Ontario east to Massachusetts and then along the coast north to southern Canada; it ranges south to the Gulf of Mexico and N Florida, whereas P. i. zaboria occurs from SE Minnesota to the Great Plains, south to Texas and east to the zone of overlap mentioned above.
