= 2023 in archosaur paleontology =

This article records new taxa of every kind of fossil archosaur that were scheduled to be described during 2023, as well as other significant discoveries and events related to the paleontology of archosaurs that were published in 2023.

== Pseudosuchians ==
=== New pseudosuchian taxa ===
Name	Novelty	Status	Authors	Age	Type locality	Country	Notes	Images
Alligator munensis	Sp. nov	Valid	Darlim et al.	Middle Pleistocene to Holocene		Thailand	An altirostral species of alligator closely related to the Chinese alligator.	
Antecrocodylus	Gen. et sp. nov		Martin et al.	Miocene		Thailand	An early diverging crocodile. The type species is A. chiangmuanensis.	
Aphaurosuchus kaiju	Sp. nov		Martins et al.	Late Cretaceous	Adamantina Formation	Brazil	A baurusuchid.	
Baru iylwenpeny	Sp. nov		Yates, Ristevski, & Salisbury	Late Miocene	Alcoota Fossil Beds	Australia	A member of the clade Mekosuchinae.	
Comahuesuchus bonapartei	Sp. nov	Valid	Kellner, Figueiredo & Calvo	Late Cretaceous (Turonian to Coniacian)	Portezuelo Formation	Argentina		
Dentaneosuchus	Gen. et comb. nov		Martin et al.	Eocene (Bartonian)	Sables du Castrais Formation	France	A member of the family Sebecidae; a new genus for "Atacisaurus" crassiproratus Astre (1931).	
Huenesuchus	Gen. nov.	Disputed	Kischlat	Middle Triassic (Ladinian)	Santa Maria Formation	Brazil	A replacement name for Prestosuchus Huene 1938, considered to be a nomen nudum. McDavid (2025) considers this name to be a junior synonym of Prestosuchus.	
Kryphioparma	Gen. et sp. nov		Reyes, Parker, & Heckert	Late Triassic (Norian)	Chinle Formation	United States (Arizona)	An aetosaur. The type species is K. caerula.	
Scolotosuchus	Gen. et sp. nov	Valid	Sennikov	Early Triassic	Lipovskaya Formation	Russia (Volgograd Oblast)	A member of the family Rauisuchidae. The type species is S. basileus. Published online in 2023, but the issue date is listed as December 2022.	
Torvoneustes jurensis	Sp. nov	Valid	Girard et al.	Late Jurassic (Kimmeridgian)	Reuchenette Formation	Switzerland		
Turnersuchus	Gen. et sp. nov		Wilberg et al.	Early Jurassic (Pliensbachian)	Charmouth Mudstone Formation	United Kingdom	An early diverging thalattosuchian. The type species is T. hingleyae.	
Venkatasuchus	Gen. et sp. nov	Valid	Haldar, Ray & Bandyopadhyay	Late Triassic (Norian to Rhaetian)	Dharmaram Formation	India	A typothoracine aetosaur. The type species is V. armatum.	

=== General pseudosuchian research ===
- Evidence of the impact of the interplay of abiotic and biotic processes on the evolution of pseudosuchians is presented by Payne et al. (2023).
- A study on the biomechanical properties of the skull of Riojasuchus tenuisceps is published by Taborda, Von Baczko & Desojo (2023), who propose that R. tenuisceps could have had a wading habit, feeding on small-sizey prey caught from the shoreline.
- A study on the bone histology of Decuriasuchus quartacolonia is published by Farias et al. (2023), who interpret their findings as indicative of early ontogenetic stage of known specimens, which might have stayed in group to obtain food and avoid predation before reaching maturity, as well as opening the possibility that D. quartacolonia may represent an earlier growth stage of the larger Prestosuchus chiniquensis.
- A study on the bone histology of Fasolasuchus tenax and Prestosuchus chiniquensis, providing evidence of slower growth rate in the latter taxon, is published by Ponce et al. (2023).
- A study on the biomechanics of the skull of Saurosuchus galilei is published by Fawcett et al. (2023), who interpret Saurosuchus as having a weak bite for an animal of its size, possessing several mechanically weak features in the skull, and likely avoiding tooth–bone interactions while feeding.
- Redescription of the braincase of Saurosuchus galilei and a study of its sensorial capacities is published by von Baczko et al. (2023), who report evidence interpreted as indicative of an enhanced olfactory acuity.
- An osteoderm and tooth of a 'rauisuchian', likely a rauisuchid, are described from the lower Elliot Formation of South Africa, and identify two potential morphotypes of rauisuchid in the lower Elliot.
- Redescription of the anatomy of the skull of Shuvosaurus inexpectatus is published by Lehane (2023).

=== Aetosaur research ===
- A study on the humeral histology in specimens of Aetosaurus ferratus from the Kaltental site (Lower Stubensandstein, Germany) is published by Teschner et al. (2023), who interpret the studied specimens as juveniles, and interpret the accumulation of small-sized specimens at Kaltental as possible evidence of gregarious behavior in juveniles of A. ferratus.
- Parker, Reyes & Marsh (2023) describe a new specimen of Typothorax coccinarum from Petrified Forest National Park (Arizona, United States) that is the largest aetosaur specimen reported to date, and report that the studied individual likely had not yet reached skeletal maturity, indicating that body size may not be a reliable indicator of maturity in aetosaurs.

=== Crocodylomorph research ===
- A study on the bone histology of early crocodylomorphs is published by Botha et al. (2023), who interpret their findings as indicating that the transition from high growth rates of earlier-diverging pseudosuchians to slower rates of bone deposition during mid-late ontogeny happened around the origin of Crocodylomorpha during the Late Triassic.
- Revision of the fossil material of Saltoposuchus connectens is published by Spiekman (2023), who considers S. connectens to be a taxon distinct from Terrestrisuchus gracilis, and interprets the histology of the femur of the second-largest studied specimen as indicative of sustained high growth rates.
- Redescription of Terrestrisuchus gracilis is published by Spiekman et al. (2023), who report evidence indicative of extensive pneumatization of the posterior skull region, as well as probable anatomical adaptations to non-nocturnal, possibly cathemeral activity patterns.
- Evidence from the osteological correlates of the trigeminal nerve in extant and fossil taxa, interpreted as indicative of an increase in sensory abilities in Early Jurassic crocodylomorphs, preceding their transitions to a semiaquatic habitat, is presented by Lessner et al. (2023).
- A study on the relationship between osteoderm relative area of pits and terrestrial or aquatic lifestyle in extant and extinct crocodyliforms, indicating that taxa with lower the degree of ornamentation were more likely to be terrestrial, is published by de Araújo Sena & Cubo (2023).
- A study on palatal grooves of thalattosuchians is published by Young et al. (2023), who report that the studied grooves were continuous with ossified canals that connected the oral cavity to the nasal cavity, and interpret the studied grooves and canals as likely evidence of the existence of a heat exchange pathway linking the palatal vascular plexus to the vessels that supplied blood to the brain and eyes.
- A study on the growth patterns of Macrospondylus bollensis is published by Johnson, Amson & Maxwell (2023).
- Young et al. (2023) describe thalattosuchian fossil material from deposits in European Russia ranging from Bajocian to Berriasian or Valanginian in age, including fossil material of cf. Thalattosuchus, Torvoneustes and Tyrannoneustes which expands known geographical range of these taxa, as well as including the oldest record of Geosaurini reported to date.
- Revision of the fossil record of thalattosuchians from the Jurassic Rosso Ammonitico Veronese (Italy), as well as description of three new metriorhynchoid specimens (including a specimen from the upper Bajocian-upper Bathonian of Cima del Porco representing one of the oldest known metriorhynchids, and a Bajocian specimen which might have been a metriorhynchid or a closely related metriorhynchoid), is published by Serafini et al. (2023).
- Evidence indicative of limited evolutionary convergence in the morphology of the postcranial skeletons of members of Thalattosuchia and Dyrosauridea, even when found within similar environments, is presented by Scavezzoni & Fischer (2023).
- New specimen of Hsisosuchus of uncertain specific assignment, providing new information on the shape and arrangement of the osteoderms in the ventral trunk shield of members of this genus, is described from the Upper Jurassic of Yunnan (China) by Wu et al. (2023).
- A study on the notosuchian physiology is published by de Araújo Sena et al. (2023), who find maximal rates of oxygen consumption of notosuchians to be lower than those of extant mammals and monitor lizards but higher than those of extant crocodilians during periods of intensive activity, and interpret notosuchians as likely having a more active lifestyle than extant crocodilians.
- A study on possible effects of climate, body size and diet on the survival of terrestrial notosuchians during the Cretaceous–Paleogene extinction event is published by Aubier et al. (2023), who find evidence of increase in body size during the Late Cretaceous which may be related to the shift from omnivorous to carnivorous diet, but find the studied data insufficient to list definitive reasons for the survival of sebecids into the Cenozoic.
- A study on the bone histology of a femur of Araripesuchus wegeneri is published by Faure-Brac & Cubo (2023), who find no evidence for the presence of sustained fibrolamellar complex in the studied taxon, and interpret this finding as consistent with the ectothermic regime inferred for notosuchians, but not with their high maximum metabolic rates and with upright stance of A. wegeneri, which therefore had a phenotype with no equivalent in the extant fauna.
- A study on the long bone microstructure in Notosuchus terrestris, providing evidence of high growth rates interrupted by periods of decreased or arrested growth, is published by Navarro, Cerda & Pol (2023).
- A study on the bone histology of Stratiotosuchus maxhechti, interpreted as indicative of growth dynamics similar to those of medium-to-large theropods, is published by Andrade et al. (2023), who argue that niche partitioning between baurusuchids and theropods was more likely than competitive exclusion.
- Description of new fossil material of itasuchid crocodyliforms from the Upper Cretaceous Bauru Group (Brazil) is published by Pinheiro et al. (2023), who also confirm the monophyly of Itasuchidae with some variation in its content, and find the South American itasuchid species to occupy a crocodyliform morphospace, possibly indicating distinct niche occupations.
- A new mandibular ramus referred to Hamadasuchus cf. reboulli is described by Pochat-Cottilloux et al., who propose an emended diagnosis of the taxon and argue that only three specimens are actually referrable to this species. They further discuss multiple anatomical characters of the mandible that they suggest represent intraspecific or ontogenetic differences and are not diagnostically valuable. As a consequence, it is suggested that Antaeusuchus may be a species of Hamadasuchus.
- Pochat-Cottilloux et al. (2023) describe the endocranial structures of Hamadasuchus, providing evidence of adaptations to terrestrial lifestyle.
- A study on the ecology of sebecids from the Paleocene locality of Tiupampa (Bolivia), using a multi-isotopic proxy approach, is published by Pochat-Cottilloux et al. (2023), who interpret their findings as indicative of ectothermic thermoregulation and terrestrial lifestyle in the studied crocodylomorphs.
- A study on the biogeography of neosuchians throughout their evolutionary history, providing evidence of the impact of saltwater tolerance of neosuchians from different subclades on their historical biogeography, is published by Groh et al. (2023).
- Description of a new specimen of Acynodon adriaticus from the Campanian Villaggio del Pescatore site (Italy) and a study on the affinities of this species is published by Muscioni et al. (2023).
- Revision of the fossil material of Cenomanian crocodyliforms from the Arlington Archosaur Site (Woodbine Group; Texas, United States), providing evidence of the presence of at least five taxa with different snout shapes and body size which might be related to niche partitioning, is published by Adams, Drumheller & Noto (2023).
- A study on the taxonomic diversity, phylogenetic relationships and evolutionary history of Australasian crocodyliforms is published by Ristevski et al. (2023).
- Venczel (2023) describes new fossil material of Diplocynodon kochi from the Eocene Transylvanian Basin (Romania), extending known fossil record of this species to four new localities.
- A tooth of a member of the genus Purussaurus is described from the Toma Vieja locality near Paraná City (traditionally considered as the base of Ituzaingó Formation) by Bona et al. (2023), representing the first record of this genus from the Late Miocene of Argentina and the southernmost occurrence of a member of this genus reported to date.
- Taxonomic revision of the genus Mourasuchus is published by Cidade & Hsiou (2023).
- A study on the neuroanatomy and phylogenetic affinities of Portugalosuchus azenhae is published by Puértolas-Pascual et al. (2023), who recover Portugalosuchus as a member of Gavialoidea most closely related to Thoracosaurus neocesariensis.
- A collection of isolated gavialoid teeth is reported from the shallow marine deposits of Eocene Turnu Roșu (Romania) by Venczel et al. (2023), who recognize a minimum of five morphotypes.
- Burke & Mannion (2023) present a reconstruction of the neuroanatomy and neurosensory apparatus of "Tomistoma" dowsoni, providing evidence that this gavialoid displayed an intermediate morphology between those of extant gharials and false gharials.
- Redescription of "Tomistoma" taiwanicus is published by Cho & Tsai (2023), who transfer this species to the genus Toyotamaphimeia.
- A study on the inner braincase anatomy of Voay robustus is published by Perrichon et al. (2023).
- A collection of eighteen isolated neosuchian teeth as well as a single isolated crocodyliform osteoderm are reported from the Berriasian–Valanginian Feliz Deserto Formation (Brazil) by Lacerda et al. (2023), who recognize a minimum of three morphotypes among the teeth.
- A collection of 55 coprolites from the Eocene Na Duong Basin (Vietnam) are described by Halaçlar et al. (2023), who interpret them as belonging to a new ichnotaxon, Crococopros naduongensis

== Non-avian dinosaurs ==
=== New dinosaur taxa ===
Name	Novelty	Status	Authors	Age	Type locality	Country	Notes	Images
Ampelognathus	Gen. et sp. nov	Valid	Tykoski, Contreras & Noto	Late Cretaceous (Cenomanian)	Lewisville Formation	United States (Texas)	A small-bodied rhabdodontomorph ornithopod. The type species is A. coheni.	
Bustingorrytitan	Gen. et sp. nov	Valid	Simón & Salgado	Late Cretaceous (Cenomanian)	Huincul Formation	Argentina	A titanosaur sauropod. The type species is B. shiva.	
Calvarius	Gen. et sp. nov	Valid	Prieto-Márquez & Sellés	Late Cretaceous (Maastrichtian)	Talarn Formation	Spain	A small-bodied ornithopod belonging to the group Styracosterna. The type species is C. rapidus.	
Chucarosaurus	Gen. et sp. nov	Valid	Agnolin et al.	Late Cretaceous (Cenomanian-Turonian)	Huincul Formation	Argentina	A colossosaurian titanosaur. The type species is C. diripienda.	
Furcatoceratops	Gen. et sp. nov		Ishikawa, Tsuihiji & Manabe	Late Cretaceous (Campanian)	Judith River Formation	United States (Montana)	A centrosaurine ceratopsid. The type species is F. elucidans.	
Garumbatitan	Gen. et sp. nov		Mocho et al.	Early Cretaceous (Barremian)	Arcillas de Morella Formation	Spain	A sauropod belonging to the group Somphospondyli. The type species is G. morellensis.	
Gonkoken	Gen. et sp. nov	Valid	Alarcón-Muñoz et al.	Late Cretaceous (Maastrichtian)	Dorotea Formation	Chile	A non-hadrosaurid hadrosauroid. The type species is G. nanoi.	
Gremlin	Gen. et sp. nov		Ryan et al.	Late Cretaceous (Campanian)	Oldman Formation	Canada (Alberta)	A leptoceratopsid ceratopsian. The type species is G. slobodorum.	
Iani	Gen. et sp. nov	Valid	Zanno et al.	Late Cretaceous (Cenomanian)	Cedar Mountain Formation	United States (Utah)	An iguanodontian ornithopod belonging to the group Rhabdodontomorpha and the family Tenontosauridae. The type species is I. smithi.	
Igai	Gen. et sp. nov	Valid	Gorscak et al.	Late Cretaceous (Campanian)	Quseir Formation	Egypt	A titanosaur sauropod. The type species is I. semkhu.	
Inawentu	Gen. et sp. nov	Valid	Filippi et al.	Late Cretaceous (Santonian)	Bajo de la Carpa Formation	Argentina	A titanosaur sauropod. The type species is I. oslatus. Announced in 2023; the final article version was published in 2024.	
Jaculinykus	Gen. et sp. nov	Valid	Kubo et al.	Late Cretaceous	Barun Goyot Formation	Mongolia	A parvicursorine alvarezsaurid theropod. The type species is J. yaruui.	
Jiangxititan	Gen. et sp. nov	Valid	Mo et al.	Late Cretaceous (Maastrichtian)	Nanxiong Formation	China	A somphospondylian sauropod. The type species is J. ganzhouensis.	
Malefica	Gen. et sp. nov	Valid	Prieto-Márquez & Wagner	Late Cretaceous (Campanian)	Aguja Formation	United States (Texas)	A basally-branching hadrosaurid. Genus includes new species M. deckerti. Announced in 2022; the final article version was published in 2023.	
Migmanychion	Gen. et sp. nov	Valid	Wang et al.	Early Cretaceous	Longjiang Formation	China	A coelurosaurian theropod. The type species is M. laiyang.	
Minimocursor	Gen. et sp. nov	Valid	Manitkoon et al.	Late Jurassic	Phu Kradung Formation	Thailand	A basal member of Neornithischia. The type species is M. phunoiensis.	
Oblitosaurus	Gen. et sp. nov		Sánchez-Fenollosa, Verdú, & Cobos	Late Jurassic	Villar del Arzobispo Formation	Spain	An iguanodontian ornithopod belonging to the group Ankylopollexia. The type species is O. bunnueli.	
Platytholus	Gen. et sp. nov	Valid	Horner, Goodwin & Evans	Late Cretaceous (Maastrichtian)	Hell Creek Formation	United States (Montana)	A pachycephalosaurid. The type species is P. clemensi.	
Protathlitis	Gen. et sp. nov	Disputed	Santos-Cubedo et al.	Early Cretaceous (Barremian)	Arcillas de Morella Formation	Spain	The type species is P. cinctorrensis. Originally described as a baryonychine spinosaurid theropod; considered to be a probably chimeric nomen dubium of uncertain affinities by Rauhut, Canudo & Castanera (2025).	
Qianlong	Gen. et sp. nov	Valid	Han et al.	Early Jurassic (probably Sinemurian)	Ziliujing Formation	China	A basal member of Sauropodomorpha. The type species is Q. shouhu.	
Sphaerotholus lyonsi	Sp. nov	Valid	Woodruff, Schott & Evans	Late Cretaceous (Campanian)	Dinosaur Park Formation	Canada (Alberta)	A pachycephalosaurine; a species of Sphaerotholus.	
Sphaerotholus triregnum	Sp. nov	Valid	Woodruff, Schott & Evans	Late Cretaceous (Maastrichtian)	Hell Creek Formation	United States (Montana)	A pachycephalosaurine; a species of Sphaerotholus.	
Tharosaurus	Gen. et sp. nov	Disputed	Bajpai et al.	Middle Jurassic (Bathonian)	Jaisalmer Formation	India	The type species is T. indicus. Originally described as a dicraeosaurid sauropod; considered to be a nomen dubium representing an indeterminate eusauropod by Mannion & Moore (2025).	
Tyrannomimus	Gen. et sp. nov	Valid	Hattori et al.	Early Cretaceous (Aptian)	Kitadani Formation	Japan	An ornithomimosaur theropod. The type species is T. fukuiensis.	
Vectidromeus	Gen. et sp. nov	Valid	Longrich et al.	Early Cretaceous (Barremian)	Wessex Formation	United Kingdom	A hypsilophodontid. The type species is V. insularis. Announced in 2023; the final article version was published in 2024.	
Vectipelta	Gen. et sp. nov	Valid	Pond et al.	Early Cretaceous (Barremian)	Wessex Formation	United Kingdom	A nodosaurid. The type species is V. barretti.	

=== General non-avian dinosaur research ===
- Schwarz et al. (2023) observe the contents of unopened containers from Tendaguru Formation (Tanzania) expeditions via CT scans, and indicate the presence of fossils belonging to dinosaurs including Dysalotosaurus, Kentrosaurus, and Giraffatitan.
- A study on causes of recovery of different interrelationships of the three major dinosaur clades (Theropoda, Sauropodomorpha, and Ornithischia) in phylogenetic studies is published by Černý & Simonoff (2023), who find the three possible ways of resolving the relationships among these lineages (Saurischia-Ornithischia, Ornithischiformes-Theropoda and Ornithoscelida-Sauropodomorpha dichotomies) to be statistically indistinguishable and supported by nearly equal numbers of characters in the datasets from the studies of Baron, Norman & Barrett (2017) and Langer et al. (2017).
- A review of the history of morphometric studies in non-avian dinosaurs is published by Hedrick (2023).
- Cullen et al. (2023) reevaluate evidence for anomalously positive stable carbon isotope compositions of dinosaur bioapatite, report that the studied anomaly is present in the carbon isotope compositions of bioapatite in tooth enamel of not only dinosaurs but also mammals and crocodilians and in scale ganoine of gars from the "Rainy Day Site" in the Campanian Oldman Formation (Alberta, Canada) but is absent in extant vertebrates from the near-analogue modern ecosystem in the Atchafalaya Basin (Louisiana, United States), and interpret their findings as indicating that the studied anomaly is not the result of a unique dietary physiology of dinosaurs.
- A study on the element ratios in the enamel of dinosaurs from the Oldman Formation is published by Cullen & Cousens (2023), who interpret their findings as indicative of differences in habitat use, dietary plant sources and feeding height between hadrosaurs and other ornithischians, as well as indicating that troodontid theropods were mixed-feeding to plant-dominant omnivores.
- Dinosaur eggshell fragments with preserved eggshell membranes are reported from the Late Jurassic Brushy Basin Member of the Morrison Formation (Utah, United States) by Lazer et al. (2023).
- Oussou et al. (2023) describe new tracksites with ornithopod, sauropod and theropod (including possible bird-like non-avian theropod) tracks from the Jurassic Isli Formation (Morocco).
- Navarro-Lorbés et al. (2023) describe tracks produced by an undetermined bipedal non-avian dinosaur from the Lower Cretaceous Cameros Basin (Spain), interpreted as likely produced during swimming, and provide information on the swimming behaviour of the trackmaker.
- Méndez Torrez et al. (2023) report the discovery of the first assemblage of dinosaur tracks (dominated by sauropod tracks, including tracks of possible non-neosauropod eusauropods, and possibly preserving evidence of herd behaviour) from the Jurassic to earliest Cretaceous Castellón Formation (Bolivia).
- Naimi et al. (2023) describe tracks of small theropods and ornithopods from the Albian-Cenomanian strata from the Ouled Nail Mounts, representing some of the stratigraphically youngest records of non-avian dinosaurs in Algeria reported to date.
- Esperante et al. (2023) report the discovery of a short-lived new site with hundreds of tracks of dinosaurs (subsequently removed because of the construction of a new road) from the El Molino Formation (Bolivia), including swim traces of theropod dinosaurs.
- Description of four dinosaur teeth assignable to three different groups (Tyrannosauroidea, Titanosauriformes, and Hadrosauroidea) from the Cretaceous Sunjiawan Formation (China) is published by Yin et al. (2023), representing the first record of a theropod from the formation, as well as representing potentially two new taxa, as the hadrosauroid teeth are distinct from Shuangmiaosaurus.
- A review of the Early Cretaceous dinosaur fauna from Thailand is published by Samathi et al. (2023).
- Li et al. (2023) report the discovery of sauropod and ornithopod tracks from the Zonggei Formation, providing evidence for the presence of abundant dinosaurs in the Late Cretaceous of the Tibet region (China).
- Flannery-Sutherland et al. (2023) describe the first dinosaur tracks from the Upper Cretaceous Nichkesaisk Formation (Kyrgyzstan), probably produced by both large-bodied and smaller-bodied theropods or ornithopods.
- A study on the duration of Late Cretaceous megaherbivore dinosaur assemblage zones in the 100 m thick stratigraphic section exposed at Dinosaur Provincial Park (Alberta, Canada) is published by Eberth et al. (2023), who interpret their findings as indicating that the dinosaur assemblage zones in the studied section had duration time of ~600–700.000 years, and were significantly shorter than those in the overlying Horseshoe Canyon Formation.
- Review of the Cretaceous non-avian dinosaur egg record from the Gobi Desert of Mongolia, including descriptions of eggs representing six ootaxa (Coralloidoolithus oosp., Dendroolithus oosp., Macroelongatoolithus oosp., Paraspheroolithus irenensis, cf. Protoceratopsidovum minimum, and cf. Spheroolithus maiasauroides) from the Upper Cretaceous localities Altan Uul I, Altan Uul IV, Bayanshiree, Shine Us Khudag and Shiluut Uul, is published by Tanaka et al. (2023).
- A study on the stable oxygen and carbon isotope compositions of dinosaur eggshell calcites and tooth apatites from the Upper Cretaceous Kakanaut Formation (Chukotka Autonomous Okrug, Russia) is published by Amiot et al. (2023), who interpret their findings as indicating that near-polar Kakanaut dinosaurs likely laid eggs in early spring, giving time for the hatchlings to grow before winter.
- A review of Cretaceous dinosaurs from India published by Khosla and Lucas (2023).

=== Saurischian research ===
- An isolated ilium of a probable non-herrerasaurid herrerasaurian, potentially representing the first record of such a saurischian in unambiguous Carnian beds, is described from the Pivetta site (Candelária Sequence; Brazil) by Garcia et al. (2023).
- Silva et al. (2023) described new herrerasaurid material from the Predebon site (Candelária Sequence of the Santa Maria Supersequence, Brazil), and interpret its anatomy as possibly indicative of the presence of a herrerasaurid morphotype distinct from Gnathovorax cabreirai and Staurikosaurus pricei.
- A track site of dinosaur footprints is described from the Middle Jurassic Xietan Formation (Hubei, China) by Xing et al. (2023), who interpret the tracks as belonging to small sauropods (similar to Brontopodus) and probable theropods.
- Lei et al. (2023) report theropod bite traces on 68 sauropod bones from the Upper Jurassic Morrison Formation (United States), as well as evidence of tooth wear in large-bodied theropods from the Morrison Formation interpreted as indicating that the studied theropods were biting into bone, and consider it most likely that the wear seen on large theropod teeth was mostly caused by contact with the destroyed bones of the more frequently consumed juvenile sauropods, while the studied bite traces were most likely caused by scavenging on carcasses of large-bodied sauropods.

==== Theropod research ====
- A study on the developmental strategies underlying the evolution of body size of non-avialan theropods is published by D'Emic et al. (2023), who report that changes in the rate and duration of growth contributed nearly equally to the body size changes.
- A study on the relationship between the body size of theropods, the area of muscles important for their balance and locomotion, and their capacity for agility is published by Henderson (2023), who argues that theropod body plan had an upper size limit based on a minimum acceleration threshold.
- Cullen et al. (2023) use multiple lines of evidence, including histology of teeth and morphological comparisons, to evaluate proposed theropod facial reconstructions, and argue that non-avian theropods most likely had lips that covered their teeth.
- Review of hand modifications and hand functions in late non-avian theropods is published by Barsbold (2023).
- Kirmse et al. (2023) describe a coelophysoid femur from the Tytherington fissures near Bristol, UK, which cannot be definitively compared and referred to Pendraig.
- Peng et al. (2023) describe abundant tracks from the Upper Triassic Tianquan track site (Xujiahe Formation; Ya'an, western Sichuan Basin, China), interpreted as produced by small theropods and representing one of the earliest record of dinosaurs from the eastern Tethys realm.
- New specimen of Sinosaurus triassicus, including a complete skull and 11 cervical vertebrae, is described by Zhang, Wang & You (2023).
- Purported "coelophysoid-grade" tibia from the Sinemurian of the Isle of Skye (Scotland, United Kingdom) is reinterpreted as fossil material of cf. Sarcosaurus woodi by Ezcurra et al. (2023).
- Sharma, Hendrickx & Singh (2023) describe dental material of a non-coelurosaur averostran theropod from the Bathonian Fort Member of the Jaisalmer Formation (India), providing evidence of the presence of at least one taxon of a medium to large-bodied theropod on the Tethyan coast of India during the Middle Jurassic.
- Tracks assigned to the ichnotaxon cf. Eubrontes, providing evidence of the presence of small theropods within the Hami pterosaur fauna, are described from the Lower Cretaceous Tugulu Group (Xinjiang, China) by Li et al. (2023).
- Footprints of small theropods with a cursorial gait are described from the Lower Cretaceous Botucatu Formation (Brazil) by Leonardi et al. (2023), who name a new ichnotaxon Farlowichnus rapidus.
- Theropod scrapes from the Cretaceous of Colorado, originally interpreted as evidence of display arenas or leks of theropods, are argued to be more likely results of failed attempts by theropods to dig near-circular bowls that were to be used as nests by Moklestad & Lucas (2023).
- Review of the fossil record of Abelisauroidea in continental Africa is published by Souza-Júnior et al. (2023).
- Averianov & Lopatin (2023) describe an elongated and highly pneumatized cervical vertebra of a long-necked theropod from the Lower Cretaceous (Aptian) Ilek Formation (Kemerovo Oblast, Russia); subsequently Averianov et al. (2024) interpret this vertebra as likely belonging to the holotype specimen of the noasaurid Kiyacursor longipes.
- Barbosa et al. (2023) study the functional morphology of dental and pedal elements of the skeleton of Vespersaurus paranaensis, and interpret it as indicating that this theropod had a generalist diet, feeding on small or immobile prey.
- Amudeo-Plaza et al. (2023) interpret a theropod tooth from the Cretaceous (Albian-Turonian) Quebrada La Totora Beds as the first record of an abelisaurid from Chile.
- Paulina-Carabajal et al. (2023) report the discovery of a natural cranial endocast of an abelisaurid from the Santonian Bajo de la Carpa Formation (Argentina).
- Longrich et al. (2023) describe new abelisaurid material from the Ouled Abdoun Basin, interpreted as indicative of coexistence of as many as three abelisaurid taxa in Morocco during the late Maastrichtian.
- Description of the anatomy of the axial skeleton of Aucasaurus garridoi is published by Baiano et al. (2023).
- A study on the evolution of the morphological characters of the pelvic girdle, femur, tibia and fibula in early theropods, especially in megalosauroids, is published by Lacerda, Bittencourt & Hutchinson (2023).
- Lacerda, Bittencourt & Hutchinson (2023) present reconstructions of the hindlimb musculature of Condorraptor currumili, Marshosaurus bicentesimus and Piatnitzkysaurus floresi.
- Revision of the spinosaurid taxonomy is published by Terras et al. (2023).
- Pedal ungual phalanx of a possible spinosaurid is described from the Jurassic (Bathonian) Jaisalmer Formation (India) by Sharma, Novas & Singh (2023).
- A collection of seven isolated spinosaurid teeth as well as a single preungual pedal phalanx of an indeterminate theropod are reported from the Berriasian–Valanginian Feliz Deserto Formation (Brazil) by Lacerda et al. (2023).
- An isolated spinosaurid tooth of uncertain provenance, likely recovered from a Valanginian exposure of the Hastings Group (United Kingdom), is assigned to a taxon distinct from Baryonyx walkeri by Barker, Naish & Gostling (2023).
- Barker et al. (2023) reconstruct the endocasts of the baryonychine spinosaurids Baryonyx walkeri and Ceratosuchops inferodios, finding their morphology to be similar to non-maniraptoriform theropods despite their highly modified skulls.
- The first baryonychine teeth from South America reported to date are described from the Lower Cretaceous Feliz Deserto Formation (Brazil) by Lacerda et al. (2023).
- Redescription of the anatomy of the skull of Irritator challengeri and a study on the affinities of this spinosaurid is published by Schade et al. (2023).
- Description of a pathological tooth of Spinosaurus from the Late Cretaceous Ifezouane Formation (Morocco) is published by Smith and Martill (2023), representing the first record of external dental pathology in a spinosaurine spinosaurid.
- Reconstruction of the musculature of the pectoral girdle and forelimbs in megaraptoran theropods is presented by Aranciaga Rolando et al. (2023).
- A pathological third metatarsal of Phuwiangvenator, indicating that the bone experienced a greenstick fracture and healed before the animal's death, is described from the Lower Cretaceous Sao Khua Formation (Khon Kaen, Thailand) by Samathi et al. (2023).
- A probable megaraptorid frontal and fused parietal fragment, representing the oldest megaraptorid skull element reported to date, is described from the Aptian upper Strzelecki Group (the "Wonthaggi Formation"; Australia) by Kotevski et al. (2023).
- A study estimating the number of telencephalic neurons in theropod dinosaurs is published by Herculano-Houzel (2023), who argues that Allosaurus and Tyrannosaurus are endotherms with baboon- and monkey-like numbers of neurons; however, this study has been criticized.
- The study suggesting that carnosaurs like Allosaurus were primarily scavengers that fed on sauropod carcasses, originally published by Pahl and Ruedas (2021) is criticized by Kane et al. (2023) but later defended by Pahl and Ruehdas (2023).
- Description of the endocranial anatomy of Allosaurus fragilis and A. jimmadseni is published by Lessner et al. (2023).
- Yu et al. (2023) describe a probable metriacanthosaurid tooth from the Middle Jurassic Dongdaqiao Formation (China), interpret its morphological similarities to velociraptorine teeth as most likely resulting from convergent evolution, and argue that other Jurassic dromaeosaurid-like teeth from the Jurassic deposits of Asia and Europe might be teeth of non-dromaeosaurid theropods.
- Carrano (2023) describes an incomplete theropod skeleton from the Lower Cretaceous Arundel Clay (Maryland, United States), representing the first definitive record of Acrocanthosaurus from the eastern part of North America reported to date.
- Zhang et al. (2023) report the discovery of fossil downy feathers of coelurosaurs from the Lower Cretaceous Zhonggou Formation (China), with macromorphology (including rachis, barbs and barbules) essentially the same as in modern bird feathers, but with the microscopic morphology noticeably different from that of living bird feathers.
- Johnson-Ransom et al. (2023) estimate bite force and cranial stresses in tyrannosauroid theropods, and interpret their findings as indicative of greater cranial stress and greater bite force in tyrannosaurids than in early-diverging tyrannosauroids.
- Carr (2023) redescribes the hindlimb of the lectotype of Alectrosaurus olseni, describes a partial tyrannosauroid skull from the Iren Dabasu Formation (China) with similarities to skulls of Raptorex kriegsteini and juvenile Tyrannosaurus rex, and questions the assignment of fossil material from Mongolia and Uzbekistan to the genus Alectrosaurus.
- Yun (2023) describes a tyrannosaurid pedal ungual from the Williams Fork Formation of Colorado (US).
- Therrien et al. (2023) describe a juvenile specimen of Gorgosaurus libratus from the Dinosaur Park Formation (Alberta, Canada), preserved with remains of two specimens of Citipes elegans within their first year of life in its abdominal cavity, and interpret this finding as indicating that G. libratus underwent a dietary shift over the course of its life.
- New fossil material of Albertosaurus sarcophagus, including the left pubis with tooth traces interpreted as evidence of cannibalism, is described from the Danek Bonebed (Horseshoe Canyon Formation; Alberta, Canada) by Coppock & Currie (2023).
- A study on the affinities of tyrannosaurines, reanalyzing the dataset of Warshaw & Fowler (2022), is published by Scherer & Voiculescu-Holvad (2023), who name a new clade Teratophoneini, and find no support for a single anagenetic lineage within derived tyrannosaurines; their findings are subsequently contested by Warshaw, Barrera Guevara & Fowler (2024), whose phylogenetic analysis indicates that recognized Daspletosaurus species represent a single anagenetic lineage ancestral to Tyrannosaurus-line tyrannosaurines.
- Fiorillo et al. (2023) report the discovery of a theropod track from the Chignik Formation (Alaska, United States) produced by a tyrannosaur larger than Nanuqsaurus hoglundi, and interpret this finding as suggestive of different selective pressures on tyrannosaurids between the northern and southern extremes of Alaska.
- Hodnett et al. (2023) report on a tyrannosaur tooth (assigned to cf. Tyrannosaurus sp.) from the Harebell Formation (Wyoming, United States), marking the first confirmed record of a dinosaur fossil discovered within the Yellowstone National Park.
- Evidence of preservation of elements associated with bone remodeling and redeposition (sulfur, calcium, zinc) in a specimen of Tyrannosaurus rex, interpreted as indicative of preservation of original endogenous chemistry in the studied specimen, is presented by Anné et al. (2023).
- A study on the formation and function of the enlarged unguals of alvarezsauroid and therizinosaur theropods is published by Qin et al. (2023), who interpret their findings as indicative of the evolution of digging adaptions in late-diverging alvarezsauroids, find the unguals of early-branching therizinosaurs to perform well in piercing and pulling, and interpret the enlarged unguals of Therizinosaurus as not adapted to functions that required considerable stress-bearing.
- A study on the hindlimb variation between the best-preserved specimens of putative ornithomimosaurs from the Angeac-Charente bonebed (France) is published by Pintore et al. (2023), who interpret their findings as indicative of the presence of sexual dimorphism in the studied theropods.
- Two ornithomimid pedal phalanges are described from the Late Cretaceous Fox Hills Formation (South Dakota, United States) by Chamberlain, Knoll, and Sertich (2023), representing the first dinosaur skeletal material from the formation.
- Averianov et al. (2023) describe an ornithomimid tibia from the Maastrichtian Udurchukan Formation, (Amur Oblast, Russia), representing the first finding of an ornithomimid in the Upper Cretaceous strata from the Russian Far East reported to date.
- A study on the bone histology of the holotype specimen of Parvicursor remotus is published by Averianov et al. (2023), who interpret this specimen as a young individual, not more than one year old, and reevaluate the course of alvarezsaurid miniaturization inferred by Qin et al. (2021), finding no compelling morphological data indicating that parvicursorine alvarezsaurids fed on colonies of social insects and that their miniaturization was related to myrmecophagy.
- A study on the range of motion at the shoulder in Mononykus olecranus is published by Senter (2023).
- Wills, Underwood & Barrett (2023) identify therizinosauroid and troodontid teeth, as well as three morphotypes of dromaeosaurid teeth, in a sample of isolated theropod teeth from the Middle Jurassic (Bathonian) microvertebrate sites in the United Kingdom.
- Reconstruction of the hindlimb musculature of Falcarius utahensis is presented by Smith (2023).
- Smith & Gillette (2023) reconstruct soft tissues of the hindlimbs and likely posture of Nothronychus graffami.
- Skeletal indicators of a propatagium are investigated by Uno & Hirasawa (2023), supporting the presence of this structure in non-avian pennaraptorans such as Caudipteryx and Microraptor.
- A review of the evidence for partially buried eggs and their significance for the evolution of contact incubation in Mesozoic pennaraptorans is published by Hogan & Varrcchio (2023).
- Averianov & Lopatin (2023) describe fossil material (metatarsals) of a caenagnathid with similaries to Elmisaurus rarus and a dromaeosaurid with similarities to Velociraptor mongoliensis from the Upper Cretaceous Bostobe Formation (Kazakhstan).
- Voris, Zelenitsky & Therrien (2023) describe new caenagnathid fossil material from the upper Maastrichtian portion of the Scollard Formation (Alberta, Canada), including fossils indicative of the presence of a large-bodied taxon similar to Anzu wyliei or Caenagnathus collinsi.
- The most complete caenagnathid specimens from the southern part of North America reported to date are described from the Campanian Aguja Formation (Texas, United States) by Wick, Lehman & Fortner (2023), who present a histology-based growth model for one of the studied specimens (the first for a caenagnathid), indicating that it needed least five years to approach fully adult size.
- The feasibility of contact incubation by oviraptorids based on their nest architecture is experimentally tested by Hogan (2023).
- A review of bone microstructure and histology in dromaeosaurids and troodontids is published by Martin, Currie & Kundrát (2023).
- Yang et al. (2023) report the first discovery of fossil materials of a large-bodied dromaeosaurid (probably a eudromaeosaur) from the Upper Cretaceous Quantou Formation (Jilin, China).
- Croudace et al. (2023) reconstruct the feather colouration of an approximately one-year-old individual of Wulong bohaiensis, reporting evidence indicative of the presence of iridescent plumage of the forelimb and hindlimb remiges and grey plumage on other portions of the body.
- A partial left tibia and articulated proximal tarsals, likely belonging to an indeterminate velociraptorine, are described from the Upper Cretaceous Lo Hueco fossil site (Cuenca, Spain) by Malafaia et al. (2023), who also review the European theropods of the Late Cretaceous.
- Averianov & Lopatin (2023) describe new fossil material of Kansaignathus sogdianus from the Santonian Ialovachsk Formation (Tajikistan), and confirm the phylogenetic placement of K. sogdianus as the basalmost Asiatic velociraptorine.
- Czepiński (2023) describes a specimen of Shri devi with a partial skull from the Upper Cretaceous Barun Goyot Formation (Mongolia), and reports that the anatomy of the skull confirms close affinities of Shri with Velociraptor mongoliensis, but also that the skull has anatomical features suggesting convergence to the North American eudromaeosaurians.
- A study on the nasal structures of Velociraptor mongoliensis, indicating that this theropod was unlikely to have a fully developed nasal thermoregulation apparatus for its brain as seen in modern birds, is published by Tada et al. (2023).
- A study on the bone histology of the holotype of Liaoningvenator curriei is published by Martin, Caizhi & Kundrát (2023), who interpret their findings as indicative of a growth pattern transitive between those of basalmost and more derived troodontids.
- Evidence from eggshells of Troodon, interpreted as indicative of endothermic physiology but also of reptile-like eggshell mineralization process, is presented by Tagliavento et al. (2023).

==== Sauropodomorph research ====
- Lockley et al. (2023) evaluate a number of trackways assigned to basal saurischians, including those belonging to the ichnogenera Otozoum, Pseudotetrasauropus, Evazoum, and Kalosauropus, and examine their implications on the gait of "prosauropods".
- A new specimen of Buriolestes schultzi, interpreted as stouter than other specimens of B. schultzi and providing evidence of previously unknown variation in robustness within this species, is described from the Late Triassic of southern Brazil by Moro et al. (2023).
- A study on sauropodomorph tracks from the Upper Triassic lower Elliot Formation (Lesotho) is published by Sciscio et al. (2023), who interpret the studied tracks as confirming that sauropodomorphs already evolved large body size by the Norian, but also indicating that the makers of the studied tracks used both bipedal and quadrupedal locomotion styles during a 10-million-years interval in the Norian.
- Chapelle, Botha & Choiniere (2023) study the histology of a small sauropodomorph humerus from the upper Elliot Formation (South Africa), and interpret this specimen as a bone of a skeletally mature individual of a new taxon with a body mass of approximately 75.35 kg, representing the smallest known Jurassic sauropodomorph reported to date.
- New information on the anatomy of Jaklapallisaurus asymmetricus is presented by Ezcurra et al. (2023), who interpret J. asymmetricus as a member of Unaysauridae.
- Müller et al. (2023) describe the remains of a juvenile specimen of Unaysaurus, found associated with the holotype, from the Late Triassic Caturrita Formation (Brazil).
- Taxonomic revision of basal sauropodomorph specimens stored in the Palaeontological Collection of Tübingen, historically referred to the genus Plateosaurus, is published by Regalado Fernandez et al. (2023).
- Aureliano et al. (2023) provide evidence of the presence of an invasive air sac system in Macrocollum itaquii.
- Bem & Müller (2023) report the first discovery of the fossil material of Macrocollum itaquii outside its type locality.
- Moopen et al. (2023) describe material of a probable lessemsaurid from the Triassic lower Elliot Formation and estimating it to be one of the largest sauropodomorphs from the Norian of South Africa, as well as the first plant-vertebrate fossil associations in the formation.
- A study on the evolution of sauropod body mass is published by D'Emic (2023), who finds that sauropods independently surpassed the maximum body mass of terrestrial mammals at least three dozen times in their evolutionary history.
- Description of the anatomy of a partial juvenile sauropod vertebral series from the Middle Jurassic Nam Phong Formation (Thailand), interpreted as indicative of non-eusauropod affinities of the studied specimen, is published by Hanta et al. (2023).
- Description of new eusauropod fossil material from the Middle Jurassic Dongdaqiao Formation (China) is published by Wei et al. (2023), who interpret these findings as showing that gigantic sauropods were more widespread than previously known during the Middle Jurassic.
- A juvenile sauropod specimen, most closely resembling early-diverging eusauropods from the Middle Jurassic but sharing some derived features with the Late Jurassic mamenchisaurids and neosauropods, is described from the Middle Jurassic Dongdaqiao Formation (East Tibet, China) by An et al. (2023).
- The holotype of Mamenchisaurus sinocanadorum is redescribed by Moore et al. (2023), who also interpret Bellusaurus and Daanosaurus as juvenile mamenchisaurids.
- A tooth of a possible member of Turiasauria, which might represent the oldest record of the group reported to date, is described from the Lower Jurassic (Pliensbachian) Halse Formation (Denmark) by Milàn & Mateus (2023).
- A study on the anatomy of the skull of Bajadasaurus pronuspinax is published by Garderes et al. (2023).
- A study on bifurcated cervical ribs in apatosaurines is published by Wedel & Taylor (2023), who interpret the studied structures as divergent muscle attachments, likely enabling improved muscular control in the middle of the neck.
- A rebbachisaurid vertebra from the La Amarga Formation (Argentina) is redescribed by Lerzo (2023), who finds it to be a derived member of Rebbachisaurinae.
- A study on the microanatomy of the long bones of Nigersaurus taqueti is published by Lefebvre, Allain & Houssaye (2023), who interpret their findings as indicating that microanatomical structure in sauropod limb bones was not subject to drastic selective pressures imposed by heavy weight-bearing.
- New rebbachisaurid specimen, providing new information on the anatomy of the hindlimbs of rebbachisaurids, is described from the Cenomanian Huincul Formation (Argentina) by Bellardini et al. (2023).
- Torcida Fernández-Baldor et al. (2023) describe a dentary and several teeth of a basal macronarian close to Camarasaurus from the Valdepalazuelos site (Rupelo Formation; Spain) living during the Tithonian–Berriasian transition, providing evidence of the presence of two macronarian taxa at the Valdepalazuelos site.
- Cervical vertebra representing the first record of a titanosauriform sauropod from the Lower Cretaceous Kanmon Group (Japan) is described by Tatehata, Mukunoki & Tanoue (2023).
- Sauropod fossil material, including a vertebra of a possible member of the genus Ornithopsis, is described from the Lower Cretaceous sediments from the Balve II locality (Germany) by Hornung, Sachs & Schwermann (2023), representing the first finding of sauropod fossils from the upland environment in Europe reported to date.
- New information on the pneumatization of the ribs of the holotype specimen of Brachiosaurus altithorax is presented by Taylor & Wedel (2023).
- Lim et al. (2023) report the discovery of a fibula of a member of the family Euhelopodidae from the strata of the Lower Cretaceous Grès supérieurs Formation at Koh Paur island, representing the first finding of a non-avian dinosaur from Cambodia reported to date.
- Cruzado-Caballero et al. (2023) describe two new cases of caudal pathology in titanosaurs from the Late Cretaceous of Argentina and evaluate these cases for interpreting the commonness of pathology occurring in the fossil record.
- The pneumaticity of a titanosaur specimen from the Black Peaks Formation (Texas, United States) is investigated by Fronimos (2023).
- Averianov et al. (2023) describe a series of caudal vertebrae representing the first sauropod material from the Shestakovo 3 locality from the Lower Cretaceous Ilek Formation (Kemerovo Oblast, Russia), and interpret it as new fossil material of Sibirotitan astrosacralis.
- New specimen of Diamantinasaurus matildae, including the skull preserving cranial elements not previously known for this taxon and showing similarities with the skull of Sarmientosaurus musacchioi, is described from the Upper Cretaceous Winton Formation (Australia) by Poropat et al. (2023).
- Titanosaur teeth representing three distinct morphotypes, including the largest titanosaur tooth ever found, are described from the Upper Cretaceous Serra da Galga Formation (Brazil) by Silva Junior et al. (2023).
- Dhiman et al. (2023) report the discovery of 92 titanosaur egg clutches from the Upper Cretaceous Lameta Formation (Madhya Pradesh, India), including three types of clutches and assigned to six oospecies, interpret their findings as suggestive of higher diversity of titanosaur taxa from the Lameta Formation than indicated by body fossils, and evaluate the implications of the studied egg clutches for the knowledge of the reproductive biology of titanosaurs.
- A study on the bone histology of Uberabatitan ribeiroi, providing evidence of rapid, uninterrupted growth that ceased with the appearance of periodic interruptions in the advanced stages of development, is published by Windholz et al. (2023).
- A study on the long bone histology of Muyelensaurus pecheni and Rinconsaurus caudamirus is published by González et al. (2023), who find no evidence of a correlation between the ontogenetic stage and the body size in both taxa, unlike in other neosauropods.
- A new sauropod specimen (a saltasaurid humerus) is described from the Campanian deposits from the Quseir Formation (Egypt) by Wahba et al. (2023).
- A sauropod tooth assigned to the family Opisthocoelicaudiidae, representing the first record of a sauropod from Late Cretaceous Russia, is described from the Udurchukan Formation, (Russia) by Averianov, Bolotsky, and Bolotsky (2023).
- Paul and Larramendi (2023) suggest that some sauropods reached sizes comparable to the largest whales, and propose that the fragmentary taxon Bruhathkayosaurus may have weighed between 110 and 170 tonnes.
- Multiple sauropod tracks assigned to cf. Brontopodus isp., providing the first ichnological evidence of gregarious behavior in Cretaceous sauropods in Africa, are described from the Lower Formation of the Cenomanian Djoua series in the In Amenas region of Algeria by Zaagane et al. (2023).

=== Ornithischian research ===
- A study on the biomechanical properties of the skulls of Heterodontosaurus tucki, Lesothosaurus diagnosticus, Scelidosaurus harrisonii, Hypsilophodon foxii and Psittacosaurus lujiatunensis is published by Button et al. (2023), who interpret their findings as indicative of limited functional convergence among studied taxa, which achieved comparable performance of the feeding apparatus through different adaptations.
- A study on the evolution of forelimb muscle mechanics and function in ornithischian dinosaurs is published by Dempsey et al. (2023), who interpret their findings as indicating that thyreophorans, ornithopods and ceratopsians evolved quadrupedality through different patterns of rearrangement of forelimb musculature.
- Review of the fossil record of ornithischian dinosaurs from Southeast Asia and southern China is published by Manitkoon et al. (2023)
- Surmik et al. (2023) study ossified tendons of specimens of Pinacosaurus grangeri, Edmontosaurus regalis/"Ugrunaaluk kuukpikensis" and Homalocephale calathocercos, reporting the presence of collagenous fibre bundles and likely fibril bundles, blood vessels and associated cells in some of the studied samples, and argue that ossified tendons can be a source of molecular preservation in dinosaurs.
- A study on the histology and enamel microstructure of the maxillary cheek teeth of Heterodontosaurus tucki, providing the earliest known evidence of the presence of wear-resistant modified dentine in an ornithischian, is published by Calvert et al. (2023).
- Description of the skull osteology of Manidens condorensis is published by Becerra et al. (2023).
- Button & Zanno (2023) present a three-dimensional endocranial reconstruction of a specimen of Thescelosaurus neglectus, and report the presence of brain traits interpreted as suggestive of cognitive and behavioral capabilities within the range of extant reptiles, as well as a narrow hearing range, acute olfaction and vestibular sensitivity which might represent adaptations for burrowing behaviors.

==== Thyreophoran research ====
- A study on the phylogenetic relationships of thyreophorans is published by Raven et al. (2023), who identify four distinct ankylosaur clades, with the long-standing clade Nodosauridae recovered as paraphyletic; they suggest replacing the latter with the names Panoplosauridae, Polacanthidae, and Struthiosauridae.
- A study on the use of quadrapediality in Scutellosaurus lawleri, and on its implications for locomotor behavior evolution in dinosaurs, is published by Anderson et al. (2023), who interpret Scutellosaurus as mainly being a biped, and suggest quadrapediality was used during specific activities.
- Galton (2023) describes a right sternal bone of a specimen of Stegosaurus from the Carnegie Quarry at Dinosaur National Monument (Morrison Formation; Utah, United States) and reevaluates three putative sternal bones from Como Bluff (Wyoming, United States) described by Gilmore (1914), arguing that they are neither sternal bones nor fossils of Stegosaurus.
- Description of nodosaurid osteoderms from the Late Cretaceous Snow Hill Island Formation (Antarctica) is published by Brum et al. (2023), who suggest that osteoderm structure may have helped nodosaurids colonize high-latitude environments more easily.
- Yoshida, Kobayashi & Norell (2023) report the discovery of fossilized larynx of a specimen of Pinacosaurus grangeri from the Campanian of Ukhaa Tolgod (Mongolia), and interpret its anatomy as indicating that Pinacosaurus might have been capable of vocalization and, like extant birds, might have possessed a non-laryngeal vocal source and used larynx as a sound modifier.
- Tumanova et al. (2023) describe anomalies within the airway and sinuses of a skull of a specimen of Tarchia, which were only detected while CT scanning the specimen, and which might have been caused by infection and/or trauma.
- A study on the cranial biomechanics of Panoplosaurus mirus and Euoplocephalus tutus is published by Ballell, Mai & Benton (2023), who find evidence of differences interpreted as indicative of relatively higher bite forces in Panoplosaurus, as well as indicative of stronger reinforcement of the skull of Euoplocephalus, consistent with highly defensive function.

==== Cerapod research ====
- Evidence of significantly rougher dental microwear texture in Late Cretaceous ornithopods compared to earlier members of the group, interpreted as indicative of dietary shift towards more abrasive foodstuffs, is presented by Kubo et al. (2023).
- Review of the diversity, relationships, biogeography and paleoecology of rhabdodontids is published by Augustin, Ősi & Csiki-Sava (2023).
- New rhabdodontid fossil material, possibly representing a taxon distinct from known Transylvanian rhabdodontids, is described from the Maastrichtian Densuș-Ciula Formation (Hațeg Basin; Romania) by Magyar et al. (2023).
- Redescription of Cumnoria prestwichii is published by Maidment et al. (2023), who recover Cumnoria as a non-ankylopollexian iguanodontian, and consider it to be distinct from Camptosaurus.
- Rotatori et al. (2023) report the presence of a rich neurovascular network in the dentary of a dryosaurid from the Upper Jurassic Lourinhã Formation (Portugal), similar to vascularisation present in cerapodan dinosaurs with high tooth replacement rates.
- Redescription of the holotype of Mantellisaurus atherfieldensis is published by Bonsor et al. (2023), who confirm Mantellisaurus to be distinct from Iguanodon.
- García-Cobeña, Cobosa & Verdú (2023) describe bone and trace fossils of styracosternan ornithopods from the Lower Cretaceous El Castellar Formation and Camarillas Formation (Spain), including manus-pes track set from the Camarillas Formation indicative of quadrupedal locomotion, assigned to the ichnogenus Caririchnium and produced by large styracosternans related to Iguanodon.
- A study on the palynological sample from the matrix surrounding a specimen of Iguanodon bernissartensis from the new Palau-3 site in the Lower Cretaceous Morella Formation is published by Rodríguez-Barreiro et al. (2023), who interpret the studied specimen as living in a coastal open forest environment with a warm and humid climate; the authors also compare the habitat of the studied specimen with those from other I. bernissartensis-bearing sites, and interpret I. bernissartensis as feeding mostly on fronds of ferns belonging to the families Anemiaceae and Cyatheaceae, as well as on the foliage of members of the family Cheirolepidiaceae.
- A study on the evolution of the dentary in hadrosauroids, providing evidence of changes during the transition from non-hadrosaurid hadrosauroids to saurolophids which probably enhanced food gathering and food processing abilities, is published by Söderblom et al. (2023).
- Description of new hadrosaurid fossils from the Upper Cretaceous Kakanaut Formation (Chukotka, Russia) and a study on their histology is published by Bapinaev et al. (2023), who interpret the studied fossils as possibly indicative of the presence of two hadrosaurid taxa in the Kakanaut fauna, and interpret the histology of the studied bones as possibly indicating that Arctic hadrosaurids of Chukotka were year-round residents of polar ecosystems.
- Joubarne, Therrien & Zelenitsky (2023) describe extensive skin impressions in three hadrosaurid specimens from the Campanian Dinosaur Park Formation (Alberta, Canada), with two specimens preserving integument of the manus showing that their digits II–III–IV were approximately equal in length and united in a common fleshy structure, and the third specimen preserving scale stripes on its torso which might have corresponded to color stripes in life.
- A study on the cranial suture interdigitation in Hadrosaurids, using data gathered from Gryposaurus and Corythosaurus is published by Dudgeon and Evans (2023) who find that suture interdigitation increased across Hadrosaurid ontogeny, that Lambeosaurines had higher suture interdigitation than other Iguanodontians, and that increased suture complexity coincided with Lambeosaurine crest evolution.
- Currie, Lü & Wang (2023) describe the maxilla of a juvenile lambeosaurine (likely either Corythosaurus or Lambeosaurus) from the Campanian Dinosaur Park Formation (Alberta, Canada), compare it with the maxilla of a probable juvenile hadrosaurine (possibly Gryposaurus) from a different bonebed from the same formation, and interpret these fossils as indicating that lambeosaurines and hadrosaurines had similar tooth counts at hatching, which subsequently diverged during ontogeny.
- Description of the anatomy of the postcranial skeleton of Laiyangosaurus youngi is published by Zhang et al. (2023).
- Seymour et al. (2023) estimate blood flow rates to the tibia shafts of Maiasaura peeblesorum, and report higher flow rates in juveniles which were likely related to higher oxygen demand for bone growth in juveniles compared to maintenance and repair of bone tissue damage in adults.
- A study on the anatomy of the holotype specimen of Gravitholus albertae is published by Dyer, Powers & Currie (2023), who interpret both Gravitholus albertae and Hanssuesia sternbergi as likely junior synonyms of Stegoceras validum.
- Han et al. (2023) describe entangled specimens of Psittacosaurus lujiatunensis and Repenomamus robustus from the Lujiatun Member of the Yixian Formation (China), and interpret the studied specimens as likely locked in combat as a result of the predation attempt on the part of the mammal.
- A study on the endocranial morphology of Liaoceratops yanzigouensis is published by Yang et al. (2023), who find that the brain, olfactory bulb and inner ear of Liaoceratops more closely resemble those observed in Psittacosaurus than those in more derived ceratopsians.
- A review of the cranial evolution in Ceratopsia is published by Nabavizadeh (2023).
- Chiba et al. (2023) provide evidence of the presence of frill margin undulations in Protoceratops andrewsi, and interpret the undulated frill margin as possible shared feature in protoceratopsids or even Coronosauria.
- Berry (2023) interprets the fossil record of late Campanian ceratopsids from western North America as indicative of a significant rate of background extinction approximately 76 million years ago, and interprets this pattern as most likely caused by competition for shared resources by sympatric ceratopsid species.
- The development and homology of epiparietals (P1 and P2) in three Centrosaurus specimens are described by Mallon, Holmes & Rufolo (2023), who suggest that these are separate ossifications that fuse with the parietal at different stages of ontogeny.
- A study on the bone histology of Triceratops, providing evidence of a relatively fast and continuous growth rate, is published by de Rooij et al. (2023).
- A study on the range of shoulder motion and on the orientation of the long bones of the forelimb of Thescelosaurus and Styracosaurus is published by Senter & Mackey (2023).

== Birds ==
=== New bird taxa ===
Name	Novelty	Status	Authors	Age	Type locality	Country	Notes	Images
Anachronornis	Gen. et sp. nov.	Valid	Houde, Dickson & Camarena	Thanetian	Willwood Formation	United States (Wyoming)	A basal anseriform of the new family Anachronornithidae. The type species is A. anhimops.	
Avolatavis europaeus	Sp. nov	Valid	Mayr & Kitchener	Eocene	London Clay	United Kingdom	A member of the family Vastanavidae.	
Caerulonettion	Gen. et comb. nov	Valid	Zelenkov	Miocene		France	A duck; a new genus for "Anas" natator Milne-Edwards (1867).	
Castignovolucris	Gen. et sp. nov		Buffetaut, Angst & Tong	Late Cretaceous (probably late Campanian)	Argiles et Grès à Reptiles Formation	France	A member of Enantiornithes. The type species is C. sebei.	
Charadriisimilis	Gen. et sp. nov	Valid	Mayr & Kitchener	Eocene	London Clay	United Kingdom	A member of Charadriiformes most closely resembling members of the group Charadrii. The type species is C. essexensis.	
Clymenoptilon	Gen. et sp. nov	Valid	Mayr et al.	Paleocene	Waipara Greensand	New Zealand	A member of the stem group of Phaethontiformes. The type species is C. novaezealandicum.	
Cratonavis	Gen. et sp. nov	Valid	Li et al.	Early Cretaceous	Jiufotang Formation	China	A non-ornithothoracine pygostylian. The type species is C. zhui.	
Danielsavis	Gen. et sp. nov.	Valid	Houde, Dickson & Camarena	Ypresian	London Clay Formation	United Kingdom	A member of Galloanseres of uncertain affinities; originally described as a basal anseriform, but subsequently argued to share possible derived characteristics with the Galliformes by Mayr, Carrió & Kitchener (2023). The type species is D. nazensis.	
Dynatoaetus	Gen. et 2 sp. nov.	Valid	Mather et al.	Chibanian	Mairs Cave	Australia	An Accipitrid, the type species is D. gaffae. It also includes the species D. pachyosteus.	
Eotrogon	Gen. et sp. nov	Valid	Mayr, De Pietri & Kitchener	Eocene (Ypresian)	London Clay	United Kingdom	A trogon. The type species is E. stenorhynchus.	
Eudyptula wilsonae	Sp. nov	Valid	Thomas et al.	Pliocene (Piacenzian)	Tangahoe Formation	New Zealand	A penguin, a species of Eudyptula.	
Falco powelli	Sp. nov	Valid	Emslie & Mead	Late Quaternary		United States (Nevada)	A kestrel.	
Fujianvenator	Gen. et sp. nov.	Valid	Xu et al.	Late Jurassic (Tithonian)	Nanyuan Formation	China	An anchiornithid. The type species is F. prodigiosus.	
Kumimanu fordycei	Sp. nov	Valid	Ksepka et al.	Paleocene (Teurian)	Moeraki Formation	New Zealand	An early penguin.	
Lavanttalornis	Gen. et sp. nov	Valid	Bocheński et al.	Miocene		Austria	A duck. The type species is L. hassleri.	
Macronectes tinae	Sp. nov	Valid	Tennyson & Salvador	Pliocene (Waipipian)	Tangahoe Formation	New Zealand	A member of the genus Macronectes.	
Mionetta defossa	Sp. nov	Valid	Zelenkov	Miocene		France	A duck.	
Mioquerquedula palaeotagaica	Sp. nov	Valid	Zelenkov	Miocene		Russia (Irkutsk Oblast)	A duck.	
Murgonornis	Gen. et sp. nov		Worthy et al.	Eocene		Australia	A presbyornithid. The type species is M. archeri	
Papasula abbotti nelsoni	Ssp. nov	Valid	Hume	Holocene		Mauritius	A subspecies of Abbott's booby.	
Papulavis	Gen. et sp. nov	Valid	Mourer-Chauviré et al.	Eocene (Ypresian)		France	A bird classified as cf. Aramidae. The type species is P. annae.	
Pelecanus paranensis	Sp. nov		Noriega et al.	Miocene	Paraná Formation	Argentina	A pelican.	
Perplexicervix paucituberculata	Sp. nov	Valid	Mayr, Carrió & Kitchener	Eocene (Ypresian)	London Clay	United Kingdom	Possibly a relative of bustards, assigned to the family Perplexicervicidae.	
Petradyptes	Gen. et sp. nov	Valid	Ksepka et al.	Paleocene (Teurian)	Moeraki Formation	New Zealand	An early penguin. The type species is P. stonehousei.	
Plotornis archaeonautes	Sp. nov	Valid	Ksepka et al.	Miocene (Aquitanian)	Mount Harris Formation	New Zealand	A member of Pan-Diomedeidae.	
Porzana payevskyi	Sp. nov	Valid	Zelenkov et al.	Early Pleistocene		Russia (Irkutsk Oblast)	A rail; a species of Porzana.	
Praecarbo	Gen. et sp. nov	Valid	Kessler & Horváth	Oligocene	Mányi Formation	Hungary	A cormorant. The type species is P. strigoniensis.	
Pterocles bosporanus	Sp. nov		Zelenkov	Pleistocene		Crimea	A sandgrouse; a species of Pterocles.	
?Pulchrapollia eximia	Sp. nov		Mayr & Kitchener	Eocene	London Clay	United Kingdom	A member of the family Halcyornithidae.	
?Pulchrapollia tenuipes	Sp. nov		Mayr & Kitchener	Eocene	London Clay	United Kingdom	A member of the family Halcyornithidae.	
Rhynchaeites litoralis	Sp. nov	Valid	Mayr & Kitchener	Eocene (Ypresian)	London Clay	United Kingdom	A member of the family Threskiornithidae.	
Selenonetta	Gen. et sp. nov	Valid	Zelenkov	Miocene		Russia (Irkutsk Oblast)	A duck. Genus includes new species S. lacustrina.	
Sericuloides	Gen. et sp. nov	Valid	Nguyen	Oligocene	Riversleigh World Heritage Area	Australia	A bowerbird. The type species is S. marynguyenae.	
Sibirionetta formozovi	Sp. nov	Valid	Zelenkov et al.	Early Pleistocene		Russia (Irkutsk Oblast)	A duck; a species of Sibirionetta.	
Sororavis	Gen. et sp. nov	Valid	Mayr & Kitchener	Eocene (Ypresian)	London Clay	United Kingdom	A member of the family Morsoravidae. The type species S. solitarius.	
Tagayanetta	Gen. et sp. nov	Valid	Zelenkov	Miocene		Russia (Irkutsk Oblast)	A duck. Genus includes new species T. palaeobaikalensis.	
Tegulavis	Gen. et sp. nov	Valid	Mourer-Chauviré et al.	Eocene (Ypresian)		France	A bird classified as cf. Galliformes. The type species is T. corbalani.	
Thegornis sosae	Sp. nov	Valid	Agnolín	Late Miocene (Tortonian)	Andalhualá Formation	Argentina	A member of the family Falconidae.	
Titanoperdix	Gen. et sp. nov	Valid	Zelenkov et al.	Early Pleistocene		Russia (Irkutsk Oblast)	A phasianid. The type species is T. felixi.	
Tynskya brevitarsus	Sp. nov	Valid	Mayr & Kitchener	Eocene	London Clay	United Kingdom	A member of the family Messelasturidae.	
Tynskya crassitarsus	Sp. nov	Valid	Mayr & Kitchener	Eocene	London Clay	United Kingdom	A member of the family Messelasturidae.	
Vultur messii	Sp. nov		Degrange et al.	Pliocene		Argentina	A New World vulture.	
Yarquen	Gen. et sp. nov		Tambussi et al.	Miocene	Collón Curá Formation	Argentina	An owl in the family Strigidae. The type species is Y. dolgopolae.	
Ypresiglaux	Gen. et sp. et comb. nov	Valid	Mayr & Kitchener	Early Eocene	London Clay	United Kingdom; United States (Virginia)	An owl. The type species is Y. michaeldanielsi; genus also includes "Eostrix" gulottai Mayr (2016). Announced in 2022; the final article version was published in 2023.	

=== Avian research ===
- A study on the evolution of limbs along avialan stem lineages is published by Wang & Zhou (2023), who provide evidence of a shift to low disparity and decelerated evolutionary rates near the origin of avialans, and interpret this shift as related to the evolutionary constrains on the morphology of the forelimb necessary for powered flight.
- Macaulay et al. (2023) report that, in spite of the differences of body shape, there is overall no difference in the position of whole-body centre-of-mass between birds and non-avian theropods, but rather that there is such difference between hindlimb-dominated predominantly terrestrial taxa and forelimb-dominated predominantly volant taxa regardless of their phylogenetic placement, and argue that the fully crouched bipedalism seen in modern birds evolved after powered flight.
- A study comparing dentin and enamel microstructure in Microraptor, Anchiornis, Sapeornis and Longipteryx, providing evidence of microscopic modifications in tooth enamel, dentin and cementum between early birds and other theropods, as well as previously unrecognized plasticity in the developmental mechanisms controlling tooth microstructure in Mesozoic toothed birds, is published by Wang et al. (2023).
- Kiat & O'Connor (2023) reevaluate evidence of molt in the fossil record of birds and non-avian dinosaurs, report rarity of molt occurrence both in the fossil record and in collections of extant bird species with simultaneous molts, and argue that the flight feather annual molt evolved with the development of powered flight, possibly only among crown birds.
- Hong et al. (2023) describe a footprint assigned to the ichnospecies Wupus agilis from the Cretaceous Daegu Formation, representing the largest bird footprint from South Korea described to date, report that ichnotaxa intermediate between non-avian theropod and unwebbed Mesozoic bird ichnotaxa generally show high morphological similarity with bird ichnospecies, and argue that these intermediate ichnotaxa might represent the ichnological record of large Mesozoic birds.
- The oldest bird tracks from Gondwana reported to date are described from the Lower Cretaceous "Wonthaggi Formation" (Australia) by Martin et al. (2023).
- Wu et al. (2023) study the phytoliths preserved in the stomach contents of a specimen of Jeholornis prima, interpreting them as indicating that Jeholornis likely ate leaves of plants from the magnoliid angiosperm clade.
- Five specimens of Sapeornis chaoyangensis with different-preserved feathers are reported from the Early Cretaceous Jehol Biota (China) by Zhao et al. (2023), who examine their implications for the taphonomy of soft tissues from the Jehol Biota.
- Evidence from the study of well-preserved specimen of Confuciusornis sanctus, interpreted as indicating that this bird was capable of prolonged flights as long as it alternated periods of high-efficiency gliding with active flapping, is presented by Chiappe et al. (2023).
- An enantiornithine specimen from the Lower Cretaceous La Huérguina Formation closely resembling Concornis is described by Nebreda et al. (2023).
- O'Connor et al. (2023) describe feathers of a young enantiornithine individual from the Cretaceous amber from Myanmar, and interpret this finding as indicating that immature enantiornithines rapidly molted body feathers.
- Redescription and a study on the affinities of Dapingfangornis sentisorhinus is published by Wang et al. (2023).
- A study aiming to determine the diets of members of the family Pengornithidae is published by Miller et al. (2023), who report that Pengornis, Parapengornis and Yuanchuavis show adaptations for vertebrate carnivory.
- Wang (2023) describes a new specimen of Parabohaiornis martini with a well-preserved skull from the Lower Cretaceous Jiufotang Formation (China), and reports the presence of the plesiomorphic temporal and palatal configurations (similar to those of non-avian dinosaurs) in the skull of Parabohaiornis.
- Clark et al. (2023) attempt to determine the dietary habits of longipterygids, reporting dental features indicative of carnivory, with additional support for insectivory.
- A study on the gastral mass preserved with specimens of Archaeorhynchus and Iteravis, interpreted as indicative of the digestive system comparable to that of extant birds, is Liu et al. (2023).
- Lowi-Merri et al. (2023) provide evidence of soaring and foot-propelled swimming capabilities of Ichthyornis.
- Blood flow rates in the femora of a variety of extinct and extant avialans are estimated by Hu et al. (2023).
- The visual fields of Hesperornis and extant foot-propelled diving birds are estimated by Pecsics & Csörgő (2023).
- Zelenkov & Arkhangelsky (2023) describe new fossil material of Campanian hesperornithids from the Karyakino locality (Saratov Oblast, Russia), including the first femur of Hesperornis rossicus.
- A synsacrum and a tarsometatarsus assigned to the Vegaviidae from the Upper Cretaceous López de Bertodano Formation (Antarctica) are described by de Souza et al. (2023).
- A study on the anatomy of the articular region of the lower jaw of Vegavis iaai is published by Álvarez-Herrera et al. (2023), who report the presence of anatomical features shared with modern neornithine birds, and particularly with members of the neoavian clade Aequorlitornithes.
- Acosta Hospitaleche, O'Gorman & Panzeri (2023) describe a partial ulna of a bird (comparable in size with ulnae of the coscoroba swan or the southern screamer) from the Maastrichtian La Colonia Formation (Argentina), showing similarities to ulnae of members of Anseriformes and possibly representing the first record of a neornithine from the La Colonia Formation.
- Evidence from the study of eggshell fragments of Diamantornis laini from the Marsawdad Formation (Oman), interpreted as indicating that the deposits containing the eggshells are approximately 8-7 million years old, is presented by Pickford et al. (2023).
- Mourer-Chauviré, Pickford & Senut (2023) describe new fossil material of Struthio coppensi from the Miocene sites in the Sperrgebiet (Namibia).
- Buffetaut (2023) reports the discovery of a plaster cast of the lost femur of Struthio anderssoni from the late Pleistocene deposits of the Upper Cave at Zhoukoudian (China), and transfers the species S. anderssoni to the genus Pachystruthio.
- The body mass and running speed of Opisthodactylus kirchneri are estimated by Jones, Vezzosi & Blanco (2023).
- A study on the evolutionary history of the elephant birds, based on data from fossil eggshells, is published by Grealy et al. (2023), who interpret their findings as supporting the placement of Mullerornis into a separate family, as well as indicative of the existence of a genetically distinct lineage of Aepyornis in Madagascar's far north, report evidence of divergence within Aepyornis corresponding with the onset of the Quaternary, and tentatively advocate synonymising Vorombe titan with Aepyornis maximus.
- Tracks made by moa from the Pliocene–Pleistocene Maniototo Conglomerate Formation (New Zealand) are described by Fleury et al. (2023).
- A study on the formation of the rhamphotheca in the middle-latest Eocene Antarctic pelagornithids is published by Piro & Acosta Hospitaleche (2023).
- A study on the histology of long bones of Lutetodontopteryx tethyensis and cf. Dasornis sp. from the Eocene (Lutetian) locality Ikove (Luhansk Oblast) is published by Dobrovolsky (2023).
- Aspects of the life history of Lutetodontopteryx tethyensis and cf. Dasornis sp. are inferred based on bone histology by Dobrovolsky & Gorobets (2023).
- The impact of including fossil taxa on inferring the ancestral morphology of the quadrate in Galloanserae is studied by Kuo, Benson & Field (2023).
- Revision of small-bodied ducks from the Miocene localities in France and Mongolia is published by Zelenkov (2023), who transfers the species Anas velox to the genus Protomelanitta and transfers the species Anas soporata to the genus Mioquerquedula.
- Fossils of hazel grouse from the Quaternary of Bulgaria are documented by Boev (2023).
- Mayr et al. (2023) describe bird cervical vertebrae from the Quercy fissure fillings (France), densely covered with tubercles similar to those reported in members of the genus Perplexicervix and in "Dynamopterus" tuberculatus from the Messel pit in Germany as well as in extant maned rat, and interpret these tubercles as a feature of distinctive clade of Eocene birds (Perplexicervicidae), possibly representing an anti-predator adaptation against the killing bite of mammalian carnivores.
- An egg belonging to a flamingo from the Pleistocene of Mexico is described by Cruz et al. (2023).
- Fossils of small rails from the late Pleistocene and early Holocene of the Southern High Plains are described by Moretti & Johnson (2023).
- The evolutionary history of the takahē and moho are inferred through analyses of ancient mitochondrial genomes by Verry et al. (2023).
- A study of Pleistocene fossils from the Naracoorte Caves (Australia) by Lenser & Worthy (2023) confirmed the presence of plains-wanderer in the fossil assemblages at this site, and suggests that this species formerly inhabited forest and woodland environments.
- Fossils of the red-throated loon and an undetermined species of Gavia are described from the Pleistocene Liuchungchi Formation (Taiwan) by Wu et al. (2023), representing the first Pleistocene records of Gaviidae in the subtropical Northwest Pacific reported to date.
- Ecomorphology of the penguin wing is studied by Haidr (2023), finding that Madrynornis resembled extant piscivorous penguins in its wing morphology.
- A skull of a small penguin, possibly representing a new species belonging to the genus Spheniscus, Eudyptula or to a new genus ancestral to both listed genera, is described from the Miocene Bahía Inglesa Formation (Chile) by Acosta Hospitaleche & Soto-Acuña (2023).
- Figueiredo et al. (2023) report a partial coracoid of the genus Morus from the middle Miocene (Langhian) of the Setúbal Peninsula (Portugal), an instance that represents the first Miocene sulid described from the Iberian Peninsula.
- Ksepka & Tennyson (2023) report the discovery of the humerus of a probable stem gannet from the Hurupi Formation, representing the oldest record of a sulid from New Zealand reported to date.
- Guilherme et al. (2023) describe fossil material of Macranhinga sp. and Anhinga minuta from the Acre conglomerate member in the southwestern Amazon region, suggesting the presence of potentially three distinct darter taxa within the same locality during the late Miocene.
- Osteological comparisons and historical accounts of recently extinct island night herons are presented by Hume (2023).
- The relationship between skull morphology and feeding ecology of vultures is studied by Steinfield et al. (2023), finding that Breagyps may have belonged to the "gulper" feeding guild, which specializes in feeding on the soft internal tissues of carcasses.
- Coprolites of bearded vultures from the Pleistocene of Portugal are described by Sanz et al. (2023).
- A tarsometatarsus of a cinereous vulture from the Late Pleistocene Gansuiji Formation (Japan) is described by Matsuoka & Hasegawa (2023), representing the first fossil record of this species from Japan.
- Pellets and a fragmentary beak of a barn owl from the Holocene of Socotra Island (Yemen) are reported by Ramello et al. (2023).
- The first known phorusrhacid footprints are described from the Río Negro Formation (Argentina) by Melchor et al. (2023), who name a new ichnotaxon Rionegrina pozosaladensis, and interpret the studied footprints as indicative of a primary role of digit III, secondary role of digit IV and a reduced role of digit II in body weight support.
- Changes in the diversity of amazon parrots in the Caribbean are inferred through analyses of genetic sequences from ancient and modern specimens by Oswald et al. (2023).
- Stidham, O'Connor & Li (2023) reexamine the holotype of Corvus fangshannus and reinterpret it as a member of the sedentary Northern Raven (Corvus corax) lineage.
- Baumann et al. (2023) report isotopic data from raven remains from early Gravettian sites in Southern Moravia (Czech Republic), interpreted as indicating that the studied ravens consumed the same range of foods as contemporaneous Gravettian foragers, regularly feeding on larger herbivores and especially mammoths.
- A review and update of the Cenozoic fossil record of birds in Argentina is published by Tambussi, Degrange & de Mendoza (2023).
- Mourer-Chauviré et al. (2023) describe fossil material of a songbird of uncertain affinities, a lovebird of uncertain specific assignment and cf. Palaeortyx from the Miocene deposits at Grillental (Namibia), representing some of the earliest records of their respective groups in Africa reported to date.
- Changes in body size of birds from the Yucatán peninsula since the Late Pleistocene are documented by Silva-Martínez et al. (2023).
- Fossil material of birds from the Pleistocene of La Crouzade Cave (France) is described by Garcia-Fermet et al. (2023).
- Neto de Carvalho et al. (2023) describe an assemblage of bird trace fossils from a Pleistocene coastal aeolianite unit from the south-west Portugal, including two new forms of traces: Corvidichnus odemirensis, likely produced by the western jackdaw, and Buboichnus vicentinus, attributed to the locomotion and feeding behaviour of a large eagle-owl.
- Gala, Laroulandie & Lenoble (2024) revise the record of bird remains from the Guadeloupe Islands spanning the last 30,000 years, providing evidence of direct and indirect human impact on changes of local bird communities.

== Pterosaurs ==
=== New pterosaur taxa ===
Name	Novelty	Status	Authors	Age	Type locality	Country	Notes	Images
Balaenognathus	Gen. et sp. nov	Valid	Martill et al.	Late Jurassic (late Kimmeridgian to Tithonian)	Torleite Formation	Germany	A member of the family Ctenochasmatidae. The type species is B. maeuseri.	
Cratonopterus	Gen. et sp. nov	Valid	Jiang et al.	Early Cretaceous	Huajiying Formation	China	A member of the family Ctenochasmatidae. The type species is C. huabei.	
Eopteranodon yixianensis	Sp. nov		Zhang et al.	Early Cretaceous	Yixian Formation	China	A member of the family Tapejaridae.	
Huaxiadraco	Gen. et comb. nov	Valid	Pêgas et al.	Early Cretaceous	Jiufotang Formation	China	A member of the family Tapejaridae. The type species is "Huaxiapterus" corollatus Lü et al. (2006).	
Lusognathus	Gen. et sp. nov	Valid	Fernandes et al.	Late Jurassic (Kimmeridgian-Tithonian)	Lourinhã Formation	Portugal	A member of the family Ctenochasmatidae belonging to the subfamily Gnathosaurinae. The type species is L. almadrava.	
Meilifeilong	Gen. et sp. et comb. nov	Valid	Wang et al.	Early Cretaceous (Barremian-Aptian)	Jiufotang Formation	China	A member of the family Chaoyangopteridae. The type species is M. youhao; genus also includes "Shenzhoupterus" sanyainus Ji, Zhang & Lu (2023).	
Petrodactyle	Gen. et sp. nov	Valid	Hone et al.	Late Jurassic	Mörnsheim Formation	Germany	A member of the family Gallodactylidae. The type species is P. wellnhoferi.	
Shenzhoupterus sanyainus	Sp. nov	Valid	Ji et al.	Early Cretaceous	Jiufotang Formation	China	A member of the family Chaoyangopteridae. Originally described as a species of Shenzhoupterus; Wang et al. (2023) transferred it to the genus Meilifeilong.	

=== Pterosaur research ===
- A study on the diversification of pterosaurs during their evolutionary history, aiming to determine the factors that affected pterosaur evolution, is published by Yu, Zhang & Xu (2023).
- A study comparing the sternal anatomy of 60 different pterosaur species is published by Hone (2023).
- Yang et al. (2023) compare wing ontogeny and performance in Rhamphorhynchus, Pterodactylus, Sinopterus and Pteranodon, and interpret the differences in the growth patterns of the studied pterosaurs as suggestive of more altricial development in Pteranodon than in smaller-bodied pterosaurs.
- Review of the fossil record of Jurassic and Cretaceous pterosaurs from Gondwana is published by Pentland & Poropat (2023).
- Revision of the pterosaur assemblage from the Kem Kem Group (Morocco) is published by Smith et al. (2023), who provide revised diagnoses for Afrotapejara zouhrii and Alanqa saharica, and report at least three distinct jaw morphotypes which cannot be referred to any previously named species.
- Jagielska et al. (2023) describe a non-pterodactyloid pterosaur specimen from the Bathonian Lealt Shale (Isle of Skye, Scotland, United Kingdom), preserving metatarsal and caudal vertebrae which are considerably larger than corresponding bones in the holotype of Dearc sgiathanach.
- A study on the surface of the holotype specimen of Scaphognathus crassirostris, providing evidence of the presence of six different types of pycnofibers, is published by Henkemeier, Jäger & Sander (2023).
- The oldest pterosaur remains found in Australia to date, including the first fossil material of a juvenile pterosaur from Australia, is described from the Lower Cretaceous Eumeralla Formation by Pentland et al. (2023).
- A study on the microstructure of the tooth and periodontium attachment tissues of Pterodaustro guinazui is published by Cerda & Codorniú (2023), who report that teeth of this pterosaur were set in a groove with no interdental separation, and find no evidence for gomphosis or the presence of replacement teeth.
- Pterosaur teeth which might represent the earliest record of Istiodactylidae reported to date are described from the Valanginian Wadhurst Clay Formation (United Kingdom) by Sweetman (2023).
- The geologically oldest specimen of Nurhachius reported to date is described from the Lower Cretaceous Jingangshan Member of the Yixian Formation (China) by Ozeki et al. (2023).
- Description of the pectoral girdle morphology and histology in Hamipterus, providing evidence of both the similarities and differences between the flight apparatus of pterosaurs and birds, is published by Wu et al. (2023).
- A study on the microstructure of teeth of Hamipterus, providing evidence of thin enamel that covered approximately half of the tooth crown, is published by Chen et al. (2023).
- Richards, Stumkat & Salisbury (2023) describe a new specimen of the Thapunngaka from the Lower Cretaceous (Albian) Toolebuc Formation (Australia), consisting of parts of the premaxillary and maxillary rostrum, and two new clades of tropeognathines, Mythungini and Tropeognathini.
- Smith, Martill & Zouhri (2023) reinterpret a purported shark spine from the Cenomanian Cambridge Greensand Member of the West Melbury Marly Chalk Formation (Cambridgeshire, United Kingdom) as a jaw fragment of an azhdarchoid distinct from Ornithostoma sedgwicki, but sharing a distinctive morphology with jaw fragments reported from the Kem Kem Beds of Morocco.
- Song, Jiang & Wang (2023) redescribe purported dsungaripterid remains from the Lower Cretaceous (Albian) Doushan Formation (China), assign the most complete element (a femur) to Azhdarchoidea, and study osteological correlates for thigh muscles on the femur, interpreting their general pattern as conservative when compared with other basal ornithodirans.
- New Jehol tapejarid skeleton, probably belonging to a specimen of Sinopterus dongi and providing new information on the skull anatomy in this species, is described by Zhou, Miao & Andres (2023).
- A study on the affinities of "Tupuxuara" deliradamus is published by Cerqueira, Müller & Pinheiro (2023), who interpret this pterosaur as a tapejarine.
- A study on the ontogeny of Caiuajara dobruskii, as inferred from its bone histology, is published by de Araújo et al. (2023).
- Fragmentary wing phalanges from the Aptian-Albian Antlers Formation (Texas, United States), originally noted by Bennett (2001) to be similar in their oval cross-sections to those of Dsungaripterus, are interpreted by Bennett (2023) as possible thalassodromine fossil material.
- Agnolín et al. (2023) report the discovery of a pterosaur cervical vertebra from the Cenomanian Candeleros Formation (Argentina), interpreted as the oldest record of an azhdarchid from South America reported to date.
- Four teeth representing the first pterosaur material from Ukraine reported to date are described from the Lower Cretaceous Burim Formation by Sokolskyi (2023).

== Other archosaurs ==
Name	Novelty	Status	Authors	Age	Type locality	Country	Notes	Images
Amanasaurus	Gen. et sp. nov	Valid	Müller & Garcia	Late Triassic (Carnian)	Candelária Sequence of the Santa Maria Supersequence	Brazil	A member of the family Silesauridae. The type species is A. nesbitti. Announced in 2023; the final article version was published in 2024.	
Mambachiton	Gen. et sp. nov	Valid	Nesbitt et al.	Late Triassic	Isalo II	Madagascar	A basal member of Avemetatarsalia. The type species is M. fiandohana.	
Venetoraptor	Gen. et sp. nov	Valid	Müller et al.	Late Triassic	Candelária Sequence of the Santa Maria Supersequence	Brazil	A member of the family Lagerpetidae. The type species is V. gassenae.	

=== Other archosaur research ===
- Redescription of the skeletal anatomy of Scleromochlus taylori is published by Foffa et al. (2023), who interpret S. taylori as a lagerpetid.
- Description of the anatomy of the braincase of Dromomeron gregorii is published by Bronzati et al. (2023), who also present reconstructions of soft tissues associated with the braincase, and report that sensory structures of D. gregorii were more similar to those of pterosaurs than to those of other early avemetatarsalians.
- Mestriner et al. (2023) describe an assemblage of silesaurid remains from the Waldsanga locality from the Santa Maria Formation (Brazil), providing evidence of the presence of a combination of dinosauromorph symplesiomorphies and silesaurid diagnostic traits in the postcranial skeletons of the studied specimens.

== General research ==
- Wang, Claessens & Sullivan (2023) establish skeletal features associated with the attachment of uncinate processes to vertebral ribs in extant birds and crocodilians, attempt to determine their distribution in fossil archosaurs, and interpret their findings as indicating that cartilaginous uncinate processes were plesiomorphically present (and likely had a ventilatory function) in dinosaurs, and maybe even in archosaurs in general.
- Aureliano et al. (2023) present the criteria which can be used to distinguish between lamellar bone fibres, Sharpey's fibres (tendon insertions) and air sac attachments in the bones of fossil archosaurs.
- De-Oliveira et al. (2023) report the discovery of an isolated tooth from the São Luiz Site (Candelária Sequence; Brazil), providing evidence of the presence of a previously unknown medium or large-sized carnivorous archosaur at the site.
- Abrahams & Bordy (2023) reevaluate tracks assigned to the ichnogenus Trisauropodiscus from the Upper Triassic–Lower Jurassic Elliot Formation, and report that the studied material includes tracks produced by a yet-unknown tridactyl archosaur with a bird-like foot morphology.
- Figueiredo et al. (2023) describe crocodylomorph and thyreophoran dinosaur tracks from the Lower Jurassic (Sinemurian) Coimbra Formation (Portugal), and name a new ichnotaxon Moyenisauropus lusitanicus.
- A possible didactyl deinonychosaurian track and an assemblage of pterosaur tracks is reported from the Jurassic Santai Formation (Shandong, China) by Xing et al. (2023).
- Evidence indicative of Valanginian maximum age for the Urho Pterosaur Fauna from the Tugulu Group in Junggar Basin (Xinjiang, China) is presented by Zheng et al. (2023).
- Juarez et al. (2023) corroborate the identification of abelisaurid and peirosaurid teeth from the Upper Cretaceous Ciénaga del Río Huaco Formation, representing the first record of both groups from the Upper Cretaceous of the Precordillera of La Rioja (Argentina).
- Putative avialan teeth from the Late Cretaceous of Alberta, Canada are reinterpreted as belonging to crocodylians by Mohr, Acorn & Currie (2023).
- Taphonomic effects of fossilization on melanin in feathers are experimentally investigated by Roy et al. (2023).
- Evidence from taphonomic experiments, interpreted as indicating that putative keratins reported from fossil feathers are most likely artefacts of fossilization, but also indicating that corneous β-proteins of feathers can persist through deep time, is presented by Slater et al. (2023).
- A review of the evolution of nest site use and nest architecture in avian and non-avian dinosaurs is published by Mainwaring et al. (2023).
- Evidence of changes in eggshell structure throughout embryonic development of the broad-snouted caiman is presented by Fernández, Piazza & Simoncini (2023), who interpret their findings as potentially explaining the differences in porosity and thickness of dinosaur eggshells found at different levels in fossil deposits with broods.
