= Caerulonettion =

Caerulonettion Temporal range: Early Miocene–Middle Miocene

Scientific classification
- Kingdom: Animalia
- Phylum: Chordata
- Class: Aves
- Order: Anseriformes
- Family: Anatidae
- Genus: †Caerulonettion; Zelenkov, 2023
- Species: †C. natator

Binomial name
- †Caerulonettion natator (Milne-Edwards, 1867)

Synonyms
- Anas natator (Milne-Edwards, 1867); Querquedula natator (Brodkorb, 1964); Dendrochen natator (Cheneval, 1983); Mionetta natator (Livezey & Martin, 1988)

Extinct genus of fossil ducks

Caerulonettion (meaning "teal teal") is an extinct genus of anatid birds from the Miocene Epoch of Europe. The genus contains a single species, C. natator, known from various limb and girdle bones. The Caerulonettion fossil material was originally assigned to various other anatid genera before being recognized as a distinct genus.

== Discovery and naming ==
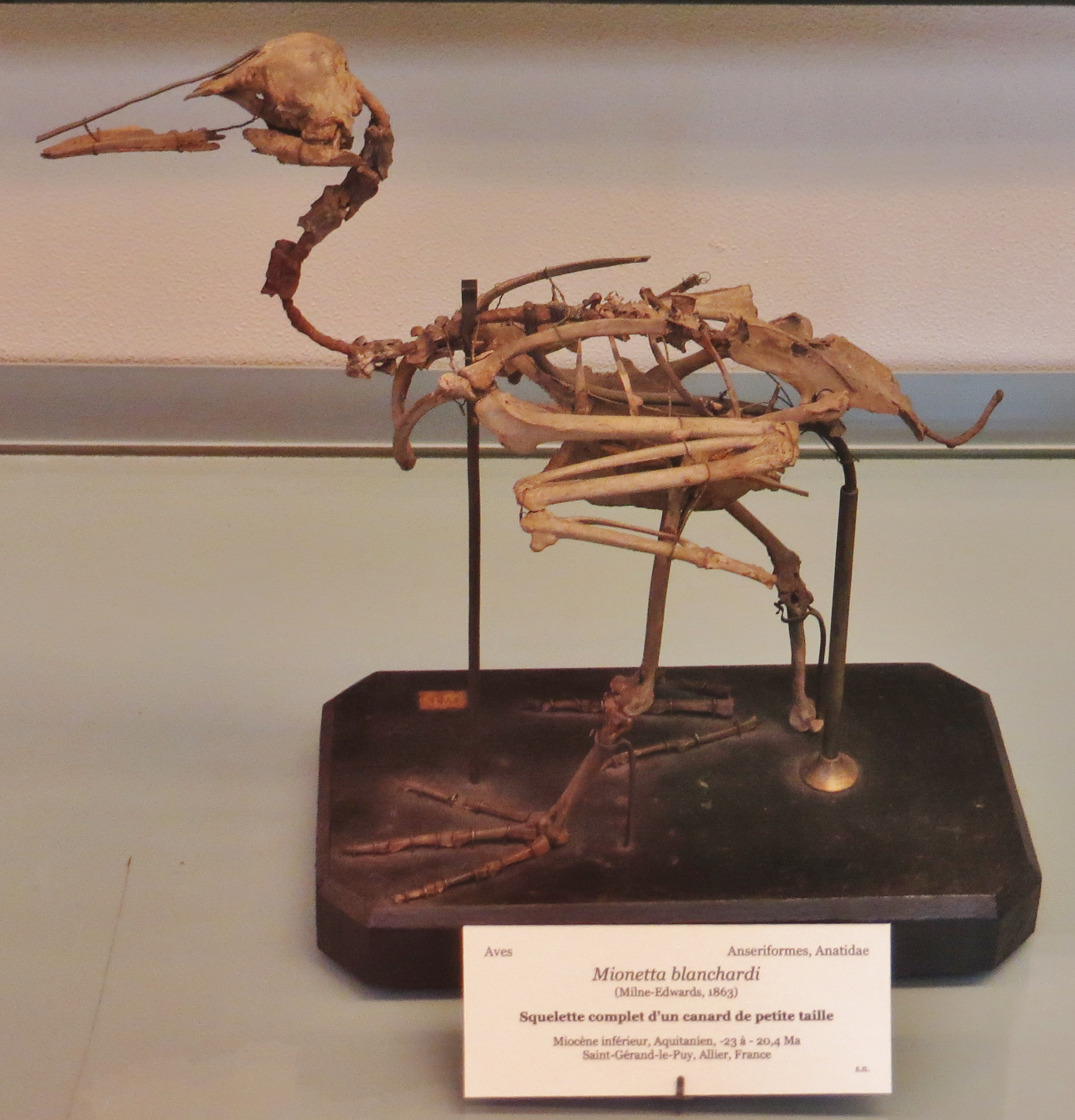
Skeleton of Mionetta, the genus Caerulonettion was previously assigned to

Fossil material assigned to Caerulonettion has been found in Early Miocene rocks of France and the Czech Republic, as well as early Middle Miocene rocks of Southern Germany. The lectotype specimen, MNHN Av-6428, consists of a left ulna found in the Saint-Gérand-le-Puy fossil locality of France. Additional bones known from nearby localities include right coracoids, humeri, ulnae, carpometacarpi, femora, and tibiotarsi. Partial left coracoids from the Sandelshausen locality of Germany and the Dolniche locality of Czech Republic have also been assigned to Caerulonettion.

Before being assigned to its own distinct genus, the fossil material was first considered to be a distinct species of Anas, A. natator, in 1867. The species was later transferred to Querquedula in 1964, Dendrochen in 1983, and Mionetta in 1988, under which the species remained until 2023.

In 2023, Nikita Zelenkov described Caerulonettion natator as a new combination for the extinct duck "Mionetta" natator based on these fossil remains. The novel generic name, "Caerulonettion", combines the Latin word caeruleus, the name of a teal or azure color, and Nettion, an obsolete genus name for extant teals, which is derived from the Greek "nēttion", meaning "small duck". The specific name, "natator", means "swimmer" in Latin.

== Description and classification ==
The preserved coracoids of Caerulonettion are proportionally and structurally similar to those seen in the extant Malacorhynchus (pink-eared duck) of Australia. However, since Caerulonettion is only known from limited fossil material, it is not known if the two genera are phylogenetically close. Zelenkov (2023) interpreted the similar coracoid structure as being a plesiomorphic trait. The coracoids of the Pinpanetta tedfordi, one of the oldest anatids, are also generally similar. Zelenkov further suggested that Caerulonettion represents a more derived anatid than Mionetta, and a possible ancestor of the Middle Miocene Mioquerquedula.
