= Yarquen =

Yarquen Temporal range: Mid Miocene (Langhian)

Scientific classification
- Kingdom: Animalia
- Phylum: Chordata
- Class: Aves
- Order: Strigiformes
- Family: Strigidae
- Genus: †Yarquen; Tambussi, Degrange & Ruiz, 2023
- Species: †Y. dolgopolae

Binomial name
- †Yarquen dolgopolae Tambussi, Degrange & Ruiz, 2023

Extinct species of owl

Yarquen is an extinct genus of owls which lived in what is now Argentina in the middle Miocene. It contains a single species, Yarquen dolgopolae. It is the oldest owl to have been formally described from South America.

== Discovery and naming ==
The known remains of Yarquen were discovered in the Collón Curá Formation of Río Negro Province, Argentina. The holotype, MLP 92-V-10-86, includes phalanges and the distal end of the right humerus.

The generic name is derived from the Araucanian word for 'owl', which is masculine in gender. The specific name honors Mathilde Dolgopol de Sáez, the first female paleontologist from Argentina.

== Description ==
Yarquen was a large owl, its humerus being comparable in size to that of the extant short-eared owl, which it thought to be about the size of. The ungual phalanx of digit 1 has lateral grooves on both sides and is strongly curved. Like other strigid owls, it was presumably a nocturnal or crepuscular predator.
