= Titanoperdix =

Titanoperdix Temporal range: Early Pleistocene (Gelasian) ~2.58–1.8 Ma

Scientific classification
- Domain: Eukaryota
- Kingdom: Animalia
- Phylum: Chordata
- Class: Aves
- Order: Galliformes
- Family: Phasianidae
- Genus: †Titanoperdix; Zelenkov et al., 2023

Type species
- Titanoperdix felixi Zelenkov et al., 2023

Extinct genus of Phasianidae

Titanoperdix is an extinct monospecific genus of landfowl, belonging to the Phasianidae family. It was related to the modern grey partridge, although it was substantially larger, reaching the size of the modern black grouse. Its fossilized remains were discovered in Early Pleistocene deposits, near Malye Goly, in Irkutsk Oblast, in Eastern Siberia.

== History and naming ==
Titanoperdix was described by Zelenkov, Palastrova, Martynovich and Volkova in 2023, based on a single fragmentary coracoid bone, labelled PIN, N° 2614/313. Its type, and only known species, is T. felixi.

The genus name Titanoperdix is derived from the prefix titano-, referring to the Titans of Greek mythology, and the suffix -perdix, referring to the modern genus of partridges Perdix. The type species, felixi, was given to honour the late zoologist Felix Yanovich Dzerzhinsky.

== Description ==
Titanoperdix is only known from a single holotype fragment of a coracoid, that appeared similar to that of modern "true" partridges and pheasants. Substantial differences in its anatomy allowed however to erect the animal into a distinct genus. The 20 cm long coracoid was substantially larger than that of modern species of partridges, indicating that Titanoperdix reached the size of a male black grouse.

== Paleobiology ==
The environment preserved in the Malye Goly locality preserves an important and rare view of the paleoenvironment of Eastern Siberia. The local avifauna is predominantly composed of waterbirds, including a modern common shelduck, an indeterminate sea duck potentially related to the modern goldeneye, the diminutive teal Sibirionetta formozovi, two other indeterminate genera of ducks, a grebe, the extinct crake Porzana payevskyi and a sandpiper, although terrestrial birds, such as Titanoperdix, a specimen associated to the modern Daurian partridge and a corvid were also present. Based on this fauna, the environment appears to be the ancient shoreline of a lake, along with a riverine ecosystem and open steppe-like environments in the hinterland.
