= Ángel Cabrera (naturalist) =

Spanish zoologist (1879-1960)

- Born: Ángel Cabrera Latorre; 19 February 1879; Madrid, Spain
- Died: 8 July 1960 (aged 81); La Plata, Argentina
- Education: Universidad Complutense de Madrid
- Known for: Many books, including South American Mammals
- Children: Ángel Lulio Cabrera
- Scientific career
- Institutions: Museo Nacional de Ciencias Naturales, Madrid; Universidad Nacional de La Plata, Argentina
- Author abbrev. (botany): A.Cabrera
- Author abbrev. (zoology): Cabrera

Ángel Cabrera Latorre (19 February 1879 – 8 July 1960) was a Spanish zoologist. He was born in Madrid and studied at the Universidad Central, Madrid (now part of the Universidad Complutense de Madrid). He worked the National Museum of Natural Sciences from 1902, going on several collecting expeditions to Morocco. In 1907, he proposed that the Iberian wolf was a separate subspecies, which he named Canis lupus signatus.

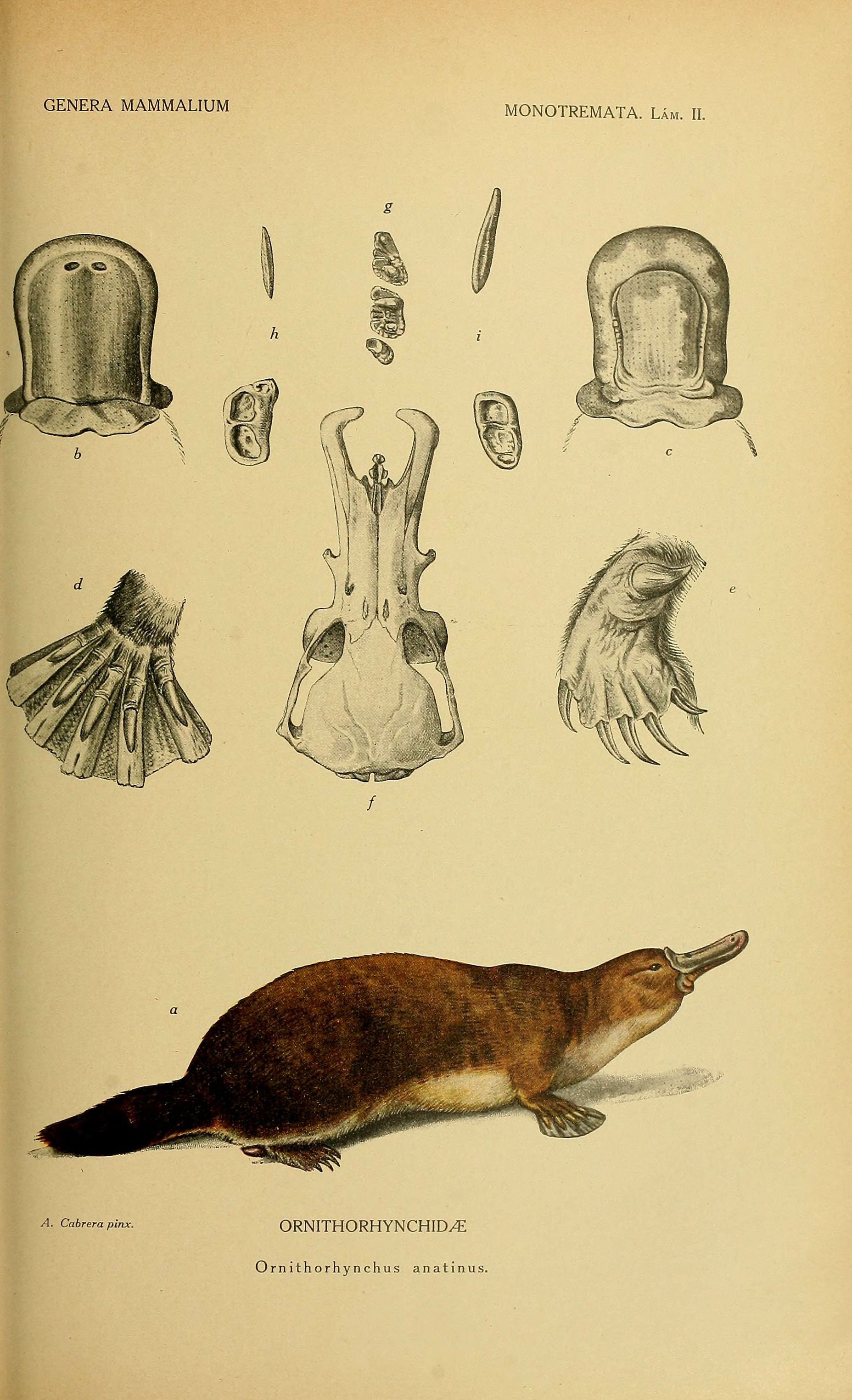
Illustration of Ornithorhynchus anatinus in the book Genera Mammalium (Cabrera, 1919).

In 1925 Cabrera went to Argentina and remained there for the rest of his life. He was head of the Department of Vertebrate Paleontology at the Museo de La Plata, and made collecting trips to Patagonia and Catamarca. In Patagonia he discovered the first Jurassic dinosaur of South America; he thus began a series of discoveries in this region, one of the richest in dinosaur remains. He supervised the doctoral work of some of the first palaeontologists of South America, including Mathilde Dolgopol de Sáez and Dolores López Aranguren.

His son Ángel Lulio Cabrera was a distinguished Argentinian botanist.

== Popularization ==
Cabrera wrote about 27 books. He was very active in disseminating ideas of zoology to the non-specialist general public. Among these works can be mentioned Catálogo de los mamíferos de América del Sur (Catalogue of South American Mammals), Zoología pintoresca (Picturesque Zoology), Historia de Leones (Story of Lions) and Los mamíferos extinguidos (Extinct Mammals), all in language accessible to non-specialist readers.
