= Charadriisimilis =

Charadriisimilis Temporal range: Early Eocene, 54.6–55 Ma

Scientific classification
- Kingdom: Animalia
- Phylum: Chordata
- Class: Aves
- Clade: Gruimorphae
- Order: Charadriiformes
- Genus: †Charadriisimilis; Mayr & Kitchener, 2023

Type species
- †Charadriisimilis essexensis Mayr & Kitchener, 2023

Extinct genus of birds

Charadriisimilis is an extinct genus of charadriiform birds from the Early Eocene (Ypresian) London Clay of Walton-on-the-Naze, United Kingdom. The genus contains a single species, Charadriisimilis essexensis, known from partial postcranial remains.

== Discovery and naming ==
The holotype of Charadriisimilis, NMS.Z.2021.40.93, was found in the London Clay in Essex by collector Michael Daniels in 1991. The holotype consists of a partial skeleton including furcula, coracoids, part of the left scapula and sternum, both carpometacarpi, left os carpi, and wing phalanges.

The species Charadriisimilis essexensis was erected in 2023 by Mayr & Kitchener as a new genus of wader-like birds. The name Charadriisimilis is derived from similis, Latin for "similar" or "like", and refers to the genus' similarity to the Charadrii. The specific ephitet essexensis refers to the type locality.

== Description ==
Charadriisimilis is smaller in size than other Eocene Charadriiformes-like birds such as Scandiavis and Nahmavis. The morphology of Charadriisimilis resembles that of the Charadrii. C. essexensis was similar in size to the common ringed plover.

== Classification ==
Charadriisimilis is classified among the Charadriiformes. Though it bears a strong resemblance to the Charadrii, and is recovered as its sister taxon. The presence of Charadriisimilis suggests the divergence of waders from sandpipers and gull-like birds by the Eocene. Cladogram after Mayr & Kitchener (2023):

- Charadriiformes
  - - Scolopaci (sandpipers)
    - Lari (Gulls, terns, skuas and skimmers)
  - - Charadriisimilis
    - - - Burhinidae (Stone-curlews)
        - Chionidae (Sheathbills)
      - - Pluvianus (Egyptian plover)
        - - - Haematopodidae (Oystercatchers)
            - Recurvirostridae (Avocets)
          - - Pluvialis (Golden-plovers and black-bellied plover)
            - Charadriidae (Plovers, dotterels, and lapwings)
