= Osvaldo Reig =

Argentine biologist and paleontologist

- Born: August 14, 1929; Buenos Aires, Argentina
- Died: March 13, 1992 (aged 62); Buenos Aires, Argentina
- Education: Doctor of Philosophy
- Alma mater: University of London; Colegio Nacional de Buenos Aires; Harvard University
- Occupations: Paleontologist, university professor, zoologist
- Employer(s): Harvard University; Central University of Venezuela; National Scientific and Technical Research Council; University of Buenos Aires
- Organization(s): TWAS; Argentine Paleontological Association; National Academy of Sciences (since 1986)
- Honours: Guggenheim Fellowship

Osvaldo Alfredo Reig (14 August 1929 – 13 March 1992) was an Argentine biologist and paleontologist. He was born in Buenos Aires, Argentina.

He made numerous contributions in the fields of paleontology and biological evolution. He studied at the Universidad de La Plata, but did not complete his studies. Later he worked at the University of Buenos Aires in the Department of Biological Sciences working with the biological evolution of mammals. In 1966 he began work at the Museum of Comparative Zoology at Harvard University. He worked for almost fifteen years at the Central University of Venezuela and the Simón Bolívar University. In 1973 he received his PhD in Zoology and Paleontology from the University of London. Among the important papers he authored was the description of Herrerasaurus, one of the earliest dinosaurs known.

In 1955, Reig was a founding member of the Asociación Paleontológica Argentina alongside Mathilde Dolgopol de Sáez.

Reig died in 1992.

== See also ==
- Category:Taxa named by Osvaldo Reig
