= Mathilde Dolgopol de Sáez =

Argentine vertebrate paleontologist

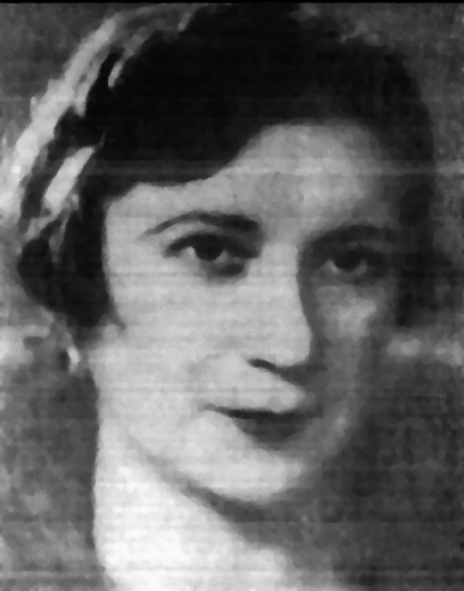
- Born: 6 March 1901; La Plata, Argentina
- Died: 29 June 1957 (aged 56); La Plata, Argentina
- Education: La Plata Museum
- Occupation: Paleontologist

Mathilde Dolgopol de Sáez (6 March 1901 – 29 June 1957) was an Argentine vertebrate paleontologist. She has “the distinction of being the first female vertebrate paleontologist in Latin America.”

== Biography ==
Mathilde Dolgopol de Sáez was born on 6 March 1901 in La Plata, Argentina. After graduating from high school, Dolgopol de Sáez began university studies at the then Escuela Superior de Ciencias Naturales of the Instituto del Museo of the Universidad Nacional de La Plata.

In 1927 she did her doctoral thesis on invertebrate paleontology under the mentorship of Ángel Cabrera (1879-1960), who came from Spain, served as head of the department of paleontology in the museum.

While she was still a student, she got a job as an assistant in the mineralogy department of the La Plata Museum and then remained working at this institution for her entire scientific career. During this time she held various positions, such as head of the laboratory and practical research in the department of paleontology, which she achieved after completing university teaching. Her scientific work began in 1927 with her publication of the first description of the fossil bird species Liornis minor in the journal Physis. Revista de la Sociedad Argentina de Ciencias Naturales.

The major part of her research was conducted between 1927 and 1940. Her research publications were mainly focused on fossil fish and birds.

In 1955, Dolgopol de Sáez was a founding member of the Asociación Paleontológica Argentina alongside Osvaldo Reig.

Dolgopol de Sáez was married to the Uruguayan cytogeneticist Francisco Alberto Sáez (1898–1976).

She died in La Plata on 29 June 1957.

== Legacy ==
The Miocene owl Yarquen dolgopolae was named in honor of Dolgopol de Sáez in 2023.
