= Lavanttalornis =

Lavanttalornis Temporal range: Middle Miocene

Scientific classification
- Kingdom: Animalia
- Phylum: Chordata
- Class: Aves
- Order: Anseriformes
- Family: Anatidae
- Genus: †Lavanttalornis; Bochenski et al., 2023
- Species: †L. hassleri

Binomial name
- †Lavanttalornis hassleri Bochenski et al. 2023

Extinct genus of birds

Lavanttalornis is an extinct genus of duck from the Miocene of Austria. The genus is known from a nearly complete specimen preserved across multiple rock slabs and stems from a locality which may represent a possible lagerstätte. It currently includes only a single species, L. hassleri.

== History and naming ==
The remains of Lavanttalornis were discovered in the Lavanttal of Carinthia in the south of Austria, which is known for the preservation of a diverse fauna dating back to the Miocene. Although not the first nor only fossil duck discovered in Austria, Lavanttalornis stands out as being the best preserved and is counted among the few nearly complete fossil ducks known worldwide. The fossil is preserved in four slabs, designated LMK-Pal 7453a to LMK-Pal 7453d, which are housed in the paleontological collection of the Landesmuseum Kärnten (also known as the kärnten.museum).

The scientific name Lavanttalornis means "bird from the Lavanttal", combining the German name for the area it was discovered in with the Ancient Greek word ornis for bird. The species name derives from its discoverer, Andreas Hassler, a professional veterinarian and amateur paleontologist.

== Classification ==
Lavanttalornis is recognized as a distinct genus on the basis of several traits which includes not just the features unique to this animal and the fact that it displays a mix of features otherwise observed in different types of modern ducks, but also the fact that it dates to the middle Miocene. This is significant due to the fact that modern genera of ducks only came to dominance during the late Miocene, with earlier Miocene ducks being typically recognized as distinct. It is however more difficult to determine which modern ducks Lavanttalornis was most closely related to. Bochenski and colleagues argue, on the basis of the animal's anatomy, that it is unlikely to have belonged to any group of diving duck, effectively meaning that Lavanttalornis was not a member of the whistling ducks, Oxyurinae and Aythyni. The team also argues that it can be excluded from the Tadornini or shelducks, a group of non-diving ducks. Things are uncertain beyond that. While Lavanttalornis shares some traits with modern members of Anatini, these could be purely superficial similarities and one of the most diagnostic regions of the humerus is not preserved.

== Paleobiology ==
Several aspects of the skeletal anatomy of Lavanttalornis may give hints towards its ecology. Notably, features of the coracoid, the humerus and the pelvis all show similarities to the corresponding elements in dabbling ducks, ducks that feed near the surface rather than diving. This is supported by the proportions of the individual bones to each other, with the ratio between humerus and caprometacarpus as well as the ratio between carpometacarpus and coracoid placing it alongside non-diving ducks. The third ratio examined in the type description, the brachial index or simply the ratio between humerus length and ulna length, is less conclusive as the values are fairly conservative among all ducks, dabbling or diving. However, the authors that described Lavanttalornis point out that these results are only tentative and may be changed once more specimen and species of modern ducks are examined.

Dabbling ducks, compared to diving ducks, have larger wings that allow for a more vertical take off, suited for landing on or leaving smaller bodies of water that may be broken up by vegetation. This ability would have been of use in the Miocene Lavanttal, which featured a variety of freshwater systems that were separated by humid and warm wetland forests within a basin that was more broadly surrounded by dryer low- and highlands as well as mountains. The preservation of Lavanttalornis as a mostly articulated and exceptionally complete fossil with only minor dislocations further suggests that the animal died in a calm environment without much underwater turbulation, allowing the carcass to decompose before being buried by sediment. A similarly well-preserved passerine fossil is known from the same locality, the quality of which could hint at the fact that this may be a Lagerstätte.
