= Falco powelli =

Falco powelli Temporal range: Quaternary

Scientific classification
- Kingdom: Animalia
- Phylum: Chordata
- Class: Aves
- Order: Falconiformes
- Family: Falconidae
- Genus: Falco
- Species: †F. powelli

Binomial name
- †Falco powelli Emslie & Mead, 2023

Extinct species of bird

Falco powelli is an extinct species of Falco that inhabited Nevada during the Quaternary period.
