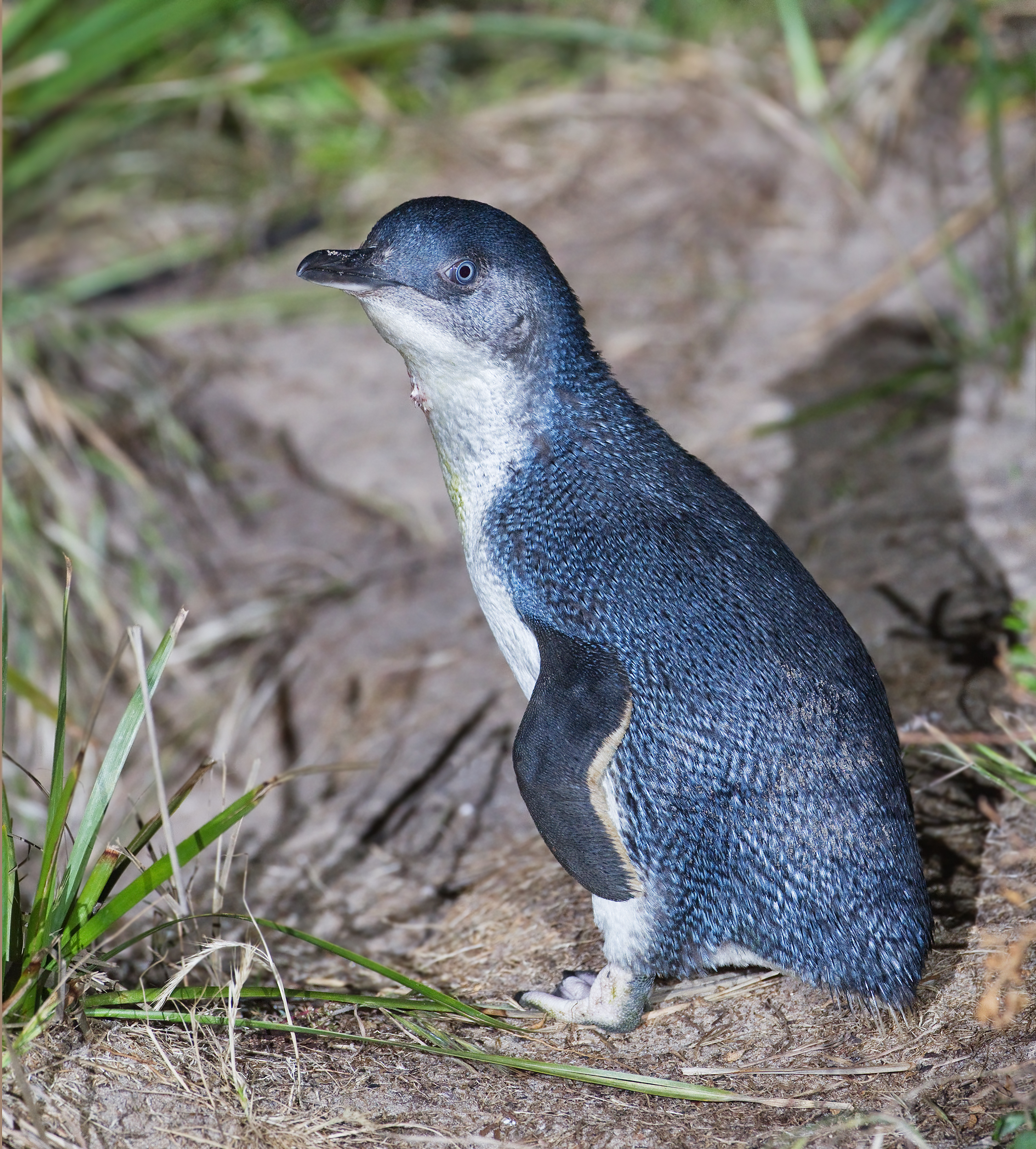
- Little penguin near burrow at night, Bruny Island, Tasmania, Australia

Scientific classification
- Kingdom: Animalia
- Phylum: Chordata
- Class: Aves
- Order: Sphenisciformes
- Family: Spheniscidae
- Genus: Eudyptula; Bonaparte, 1856

Type species
- Aptenodytes minor

Species
- Eudyptula minor; †Eudyptula wilsonae

= Eudyptula =

Eudyptula Temporal range: Piacenzian–Recent

Genus of birds

The genus Eudyptula from Ancient Greek εὖ (eû), meaning "well", δύπτης (dúptes), meaning "diver", and Latin -ula, a diminutive suffix, contains a single extant species of penguin, found in southern Australia, Tasmania, and New Zealand (including the Chatham Islands). It is commonly known as the little penguin, little blue penguin, or, in Australia, fairy penguin. In the language of the Māori people of New Zealand, little penguins are known as kororā.

For many years, a white-flippered form of the little penguin found only in North Canterbury, New Zealand was considered either a separate species, Eudyptula albosignata, or just a subspecies, Eudyptula minor albosignata. Analysis of mtDNA revealed that Eudyptula falls instead into two groups: a western one, found along the southern coast of Australia and the Otago region of New Zealand, and another found in the rest of New Zealand. E. novaehollandiae probably arrived in New Zealand from Australia less than 500 years ago, following the local extinction of E. minor in Otago.

== Classification ==
Order Sphenisciformes

- Family Spheniscidae
  - Genus Eudyptula
    - Eudyptula minor – little penguin
    - †Eudyptula wilsonae

=== Extant Species ===
Image	Scientific name	Common name	Distribution
	Eudyptula minor	little penguin	New Zealand, Chatham Islands, Southern Australia, Otago

=== Fossil species ===
Image	Scientific name	Distribution
	Eudyptula wilsonae	Tangahoe Formation, Taranaki, New Zealand
