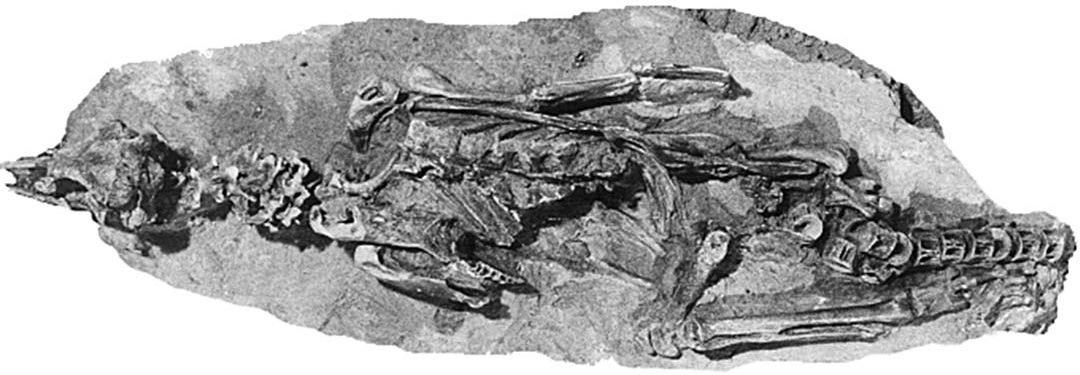

Scientific classification
- Kingdom: Animalia
- Phylum: Chordata
- Class: Aves
- Order: Sphenisciformes
- Family: Spheniscidae
- Genus: †Madrynornis
- Species: †M. mirandus

Binomial name
- †Madrynornis mirandus Hospitaleche et al., 2007

= Madrynornis =

Madrynornis Temporal range: Late Miocene

Extinct genus of birds

Madrynornis is an extinct monotypic genus of spheniscid containing the species M. mirandus that inhabited Argentina during the Late Miocene.
