= Darla Zelenitsky =

Canadian paleontologist

Darla K. Zelenitsky (born 1969) is a Canadian paleontologist most notable for her research on dinosaur. She co-led a team that described the first feathered dinosaurs from the Americas (in 2012), and has co-authored over 100 publications in the field. Her research primarily focuses on paleobiology and paleoenvironments, with a key look on dinosaurs using extinct taxa to detect and infer the changes seen over time.

== Education ==
Zelenitsky received her Bachelor of Science at the University of Manitoba, and then went on to obtain her Master of Science at the University of Calgary. She went on to complete her PhD at the University of Calgary, finishing in 2004. She has continued to work at the University of Calgary as an associate professor in the Department of Earth, Energy and Environment.

== Career ==
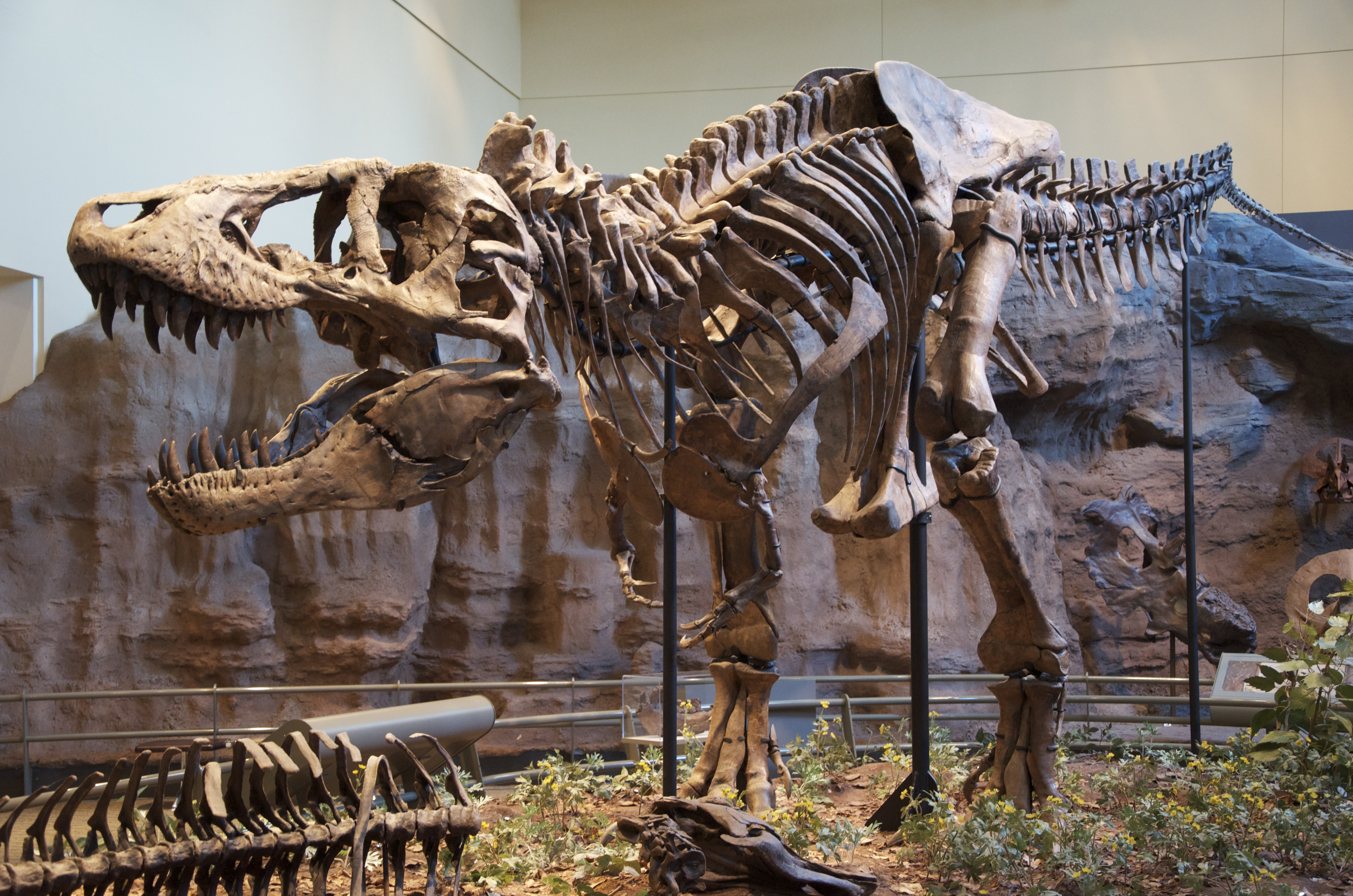
Mounted Tyrannosaurus rex skeleton

In 1996, while working alongside several other well-known paleontologists including Philip J. Currie, Zelenitsky first published an analysis of dinosaur eggshells and bones with the capability of ERD on thin-film, high-temperature superconductors. She would then go on to contribute to over twelve other publications before finally receiving her PhD. Since then, Darla has published articles for the New York times and the Smithsonian on the topic of paleontology. She has also aided in the discovery of Mussaurus egg compositions, and has provided evidence to suggest that the Tyrannosaurus rex was pivotal to the historical rise of giant carnivores. She has been featured in Global News, discussing dinosaur eggs missing from the fossil record.
