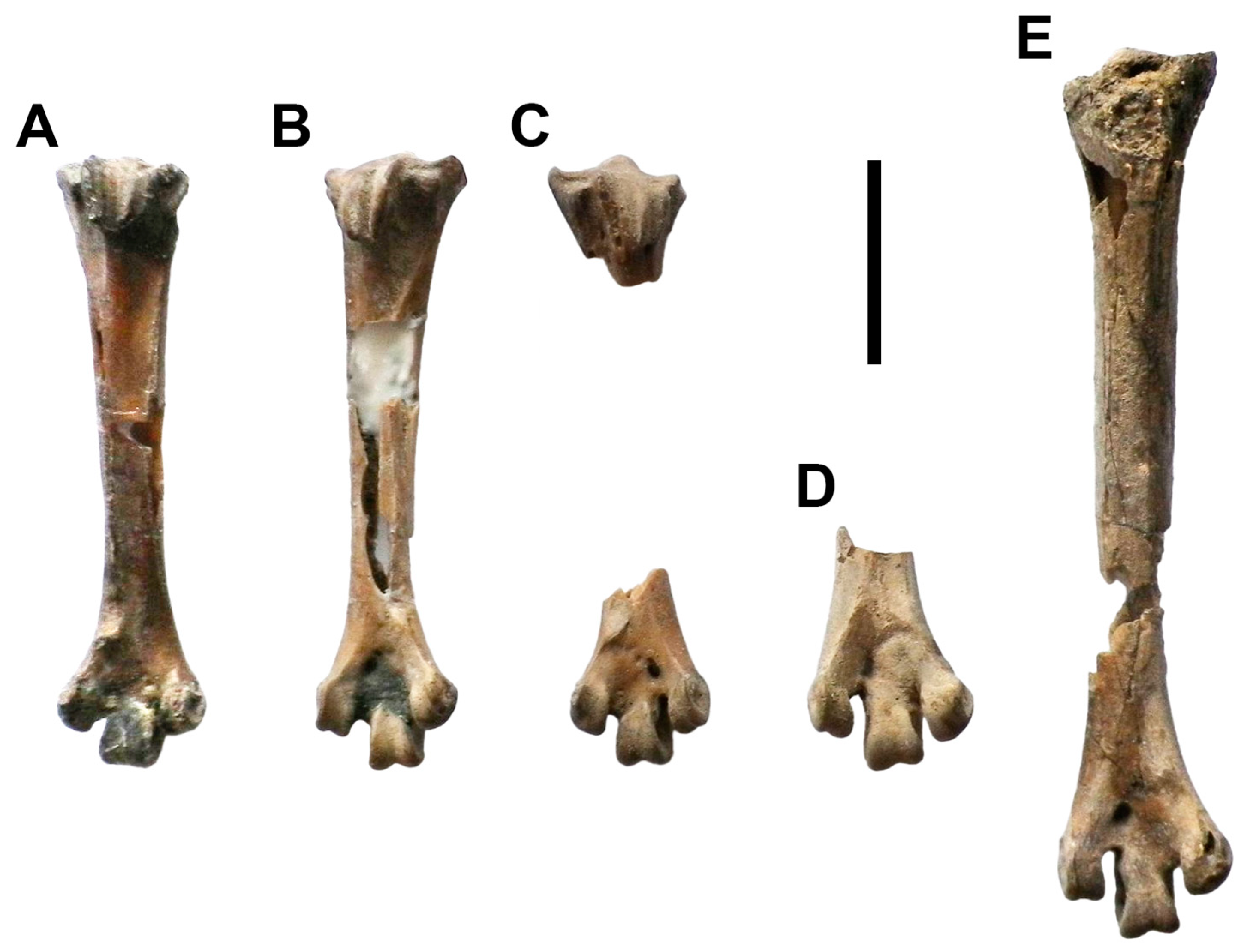
- Tarsometarsi bones from the holotype specimen of Danielsacis nazensis

Scientific classification
- Kingdom: Animalia
- Phylum: Chordata
- Class: Aves
- Order: Anseriformes
- Genus: †Danielsavis; Houde, Dickson & Camarena, 2023
- Species: †D. nazensis

Binomial name
- †Danielsavis nazensis Houde, Dickson & Camarena, 2023

= Danielsavis =

Danielsavis Temporal range: Ypresian

Extinct genus of anseriform bird

Danielsavis is an extinct monotypic genus of anseriform bird known from fossils found in England dating to the Ypresian stage of the Eocene epoch.

== Etymology ==
The genus Danielsavis is named after Michael C. S. Daniels for his discovery of the fossil site known as The Naze, a site stratigraphically located within the London Clay Formation which has preserved an extremely biodiverse avifauna. The specific epithet of the type species, Danielsavis nazensis, is named after the aforementioned fossil site.
