= Tegulavis =

Tegulavis Temporal range: Ypresian

Scientific classification
- Kingdom: Animalia
- Phylum: Chordata
- Class: Aves
- Order: Galliformes
- Genus: †Tegulavis; Mourer-Chauviré et al., 2024
- Species: †T. corbalani

Binomial name
- †Tegulavis corbalani Mourer-Chauviré et al., 2024

Extinct genus of birds

Tegulavis is an extinct genus of bird that lived in the Ypresian. It is currently known only from a right coracoid which resembles stem group Galliformes, but cannot be more precisely placed.

== Distribution ==
Tegulavis corbalani is known from the site of La Borie in France.
