= Perplexicervix =

Perplexicervix Temporal range: Eocene

Scientific classification
- Kingdom: Animalia
- Phylum: Chordata
- Class: Aves
- Order: Otidiformes (?)
- Family: †Perplexicervidae
- Genus: †Perplexicervix; Mayr, 2010

Type species
- †Perplexicervix microcephalon Mayr, 2010

Other species
- P. paucituberculata Mayr, 2023

Extinct genus of birds

Perplexicervix is a genus of bird in the monotypic family Perplexicervicidae that lived during the Eocene epoch. Its affinities are uncertain, but similarities with Otidiformes were noted in tentatively assigned postcranial remains.

== Distribution ==
The type species, P. microcephalon, appears in the eleventh Mammal-Paleogene zone of Hessen, Germany, its fossils having been found in the Messel Formation. The remains of a second species, P. paucituberculata, hail from the Walton Member of the London Clay Formation and date to the Ypresian.
