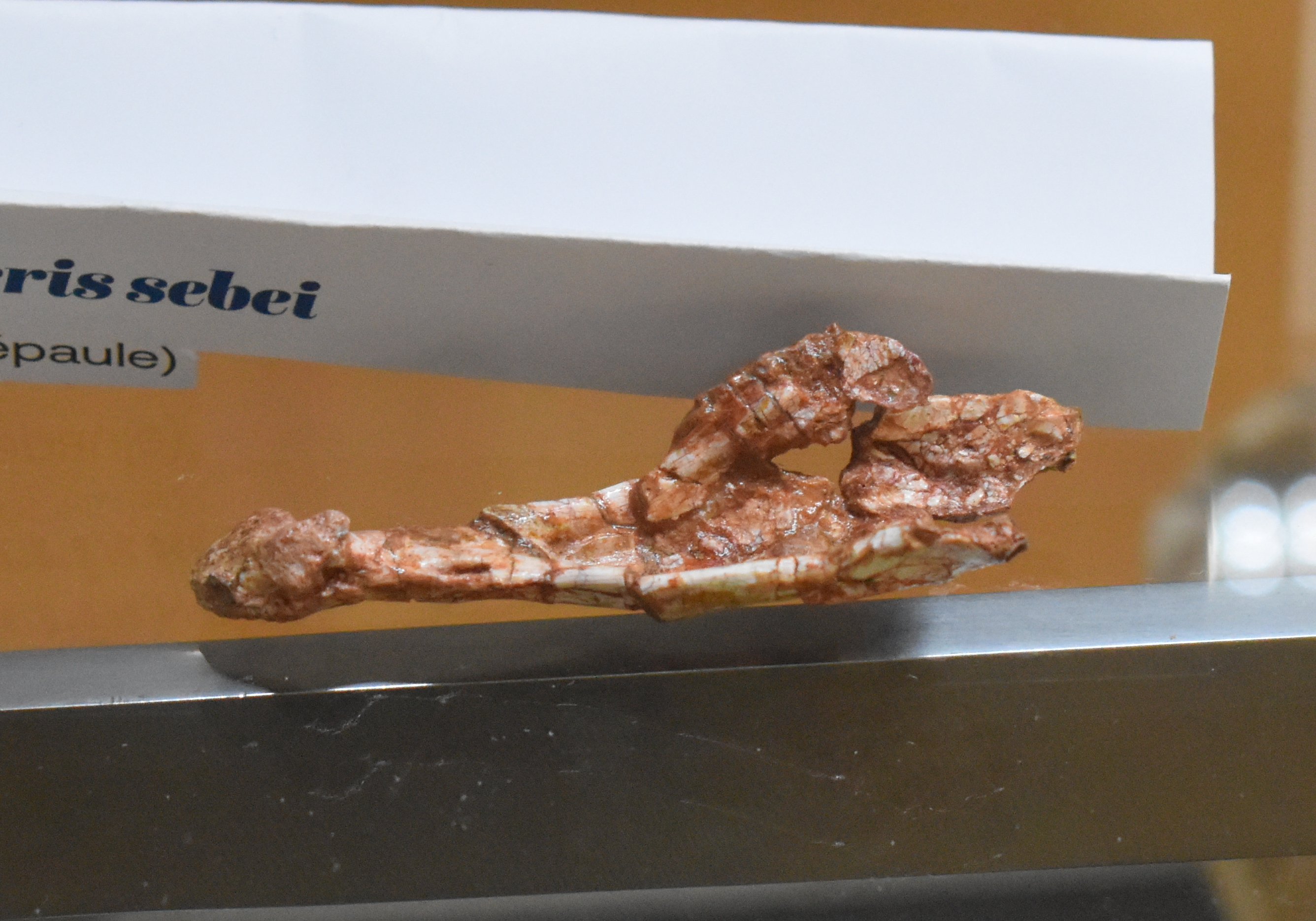
- Holotype coracoid of C. sebei at the Musée de Cruzy

Scientific classification
- Kingdom: Animalia
- Phylum: Chordata
- Class: Reptilia
- Clade: Dinosauria
- Clade: Saurischia
- Clade: Theropoda
- Clade: Avialae
- Clade: †Enantiornithes
- Genus: †Castignovolucris; Buffetaut, Angst & Tong, 2023
- Species: †C. sebei

Binomial name
- †Castignovolucris sebei Buffetaut, Angst & Tong, 2023

= Castignovolucris =

Castignovolucris Temporal range: Late Cretaceous, ~74–72 Ma

Extinct genus of bird

Castignovolucris (meaning "Castigno valley bird") is an extinct genus of enantornithe bird from the Late Cretaceous "continental red clays" of the Argiles et Grès à Reptiles Formation of France. It contains a single species, C. sebei, which was named and described in 2023.

== Discovery and naming ==
The holotype, MC-VCZ2-6, a right coracoid, was discovered sometime around the 1990s near Villespassans by Stéphane Sèbe and was donated to the Musée de Cruzy.

Castignovolucris sebei was named and described by Buffetaut, Angst & Tong (2023).

== Description ==
Castignovolucris was estimated to have a wingspan of around 127–185 cm (50–73 in) and may have been 75 to 110 cm (29.5 to 43.5 in) long when fully grown, making it one of the largest known enantiornitheans to date.

== Paleobiology ==
Castignovolucris would have been found on the Ibero-Armorican island in what is today Occitania, France.
