= Eudyptula wilsonae =

Eudyptula wilsonae Temporal range: Piacenzian

Scientific classification
- Kingdom: Animalia
- Phylum: Chordata
- Class: Aves
- Order: Sphenisciformes
- Family: Spheniscidae
- Genus: Eudyptula
- Species: †E. wilsonae

Binomial name
- †Eudyptula wilsonae Thomas et al., 2023

Extinct species of penguin

Eudyptula wilsonae commonly known as Wilson's little penguin, is an extinct species of Eudyptula that lived in New Zealand during the Piacenzian stage.
