= Mioquerquedula =

Mioquerquedula Temporal range: Middle Miocene

Scientific classification
- Domain: Eukaryota
- Kingdom: Animalia
- Phylum: Chordata
- Class: Aves
- Order: Anseriformes
- Family: Anatidae
- Genus: †Mioquerquedula; Zelenkov & Kuročkin, 2012

Type species
- †Mioquerquedula minutissima Zelenkov & Kuročkin, 2012

Other species
- †M. palaeotagaica Zelenkov 2023; †M. velox (A. Milne-Edwards, 1868)

Extinct genus of birds

Mioquerquedula is an extinct genus of ducks from the Middle Miocene containing two species, M. minutissima and M. velox. It was one of the smallest anseriforms known. The genus was erected by Nikita Zelenkov and Evgenii Nikolaievich Kurochkin in 2012.

== See also ==
- African pygmy goose
- Cotton pygmy goose
- Smallest organisms
