= Porzana payevskyi =

Porzana payevskyi Temporal range: Early Pleistocene

Scientific classification
- Kingdom: Animalia
- Phylum: Chordata
- Class: Aves
- Order: Gruiformes
- Family: Rallidae
- Genus: Porzana
- Species: †P. payevskyi

Binomial name
- †Porzana payevskyi Zelenkov et al., 2023

Extinct species of bird

Porzana payevskyi is an extinct species of Porzana that inhabited Irkutsk Oblast during the Early Pleistocene.
