= Cambron Abbey =

Former abbey in Brugelette, Hainaut, Belgium

- Abbaye de Cambron (French)
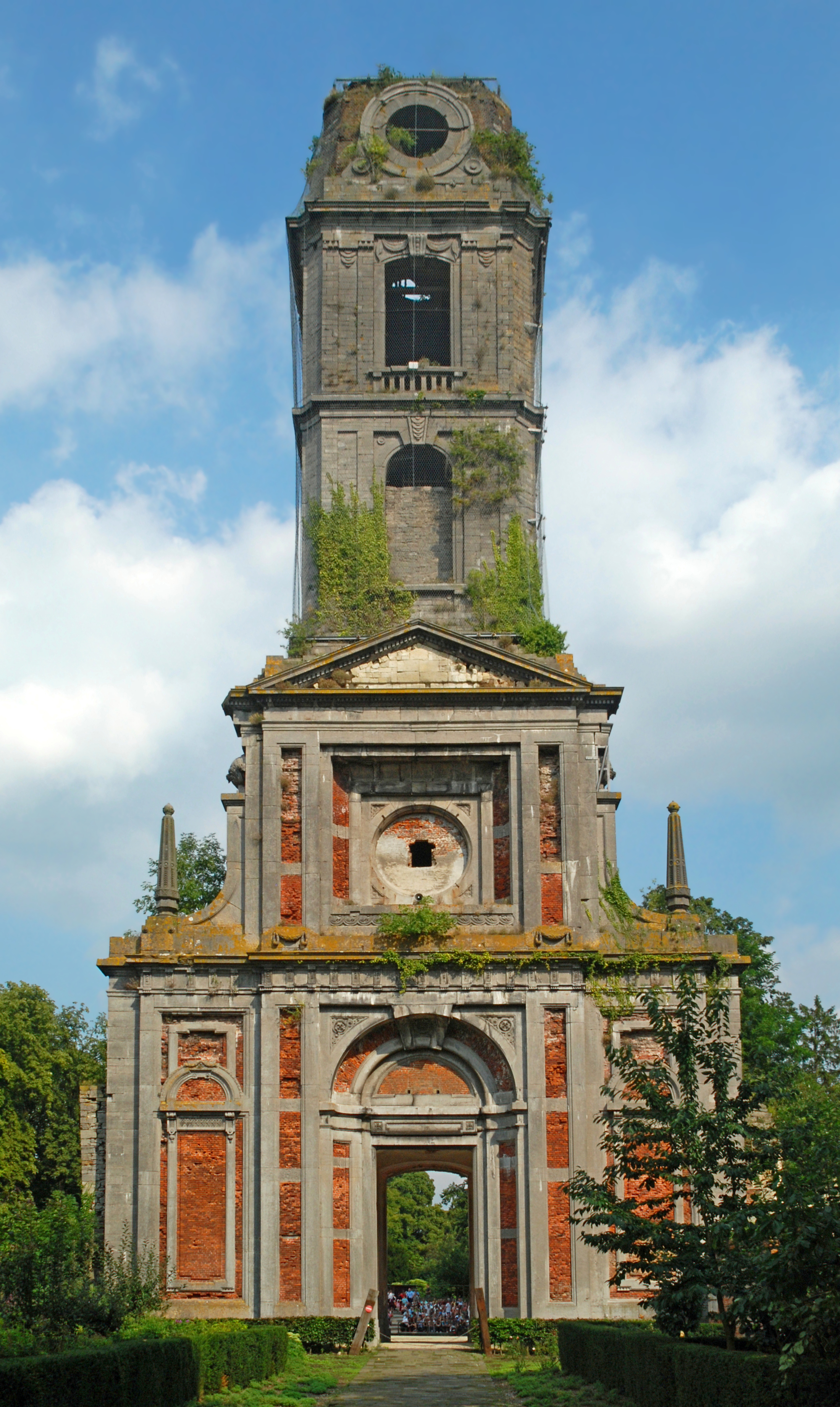
- Tower of the abbey church (1774)
- Interactive map of the Cambron Abbey area

General information
- Type: Abbey
- Location: Brugelette, Hainaut, Belgium
- Coordinates: 50°35′15″N 3°53′10″E

Cambron Abbey (French: Abbaye de Cambron; Latin: Camberona) was a Cistercian abbey in Cambron-Casteau, in the municipality of Brugelette, Hainaut, Belgium. It was located on the river Blanche, a tributary of the Dender, about 9 km (5.6 mi) to the south-east of Ath. Dissolved in 1782, parts of the abbey still survive as ruins within Pairi Daiza zoo and botanical garden.

== History ==
=== Heroic beginnings ===
Twelve monks from Clairvaux arrived at Cambron on August 1, 1148. They were sent by St. Bernard, abbot of Clairvaux, at the invitation of Anselm of Trazegnies, lord of Péronnes-lez-Binche and canon and treasurer of the Collegiate Chapter of Soignies, who offered land on the banks of the Dender for the foundation of an abbey. Living conditions were rudimentary. However, the Cistercian Order had already become prestigious. A Cistercian, the abbot of Tre Fontaine, had just been elected as Pope Eugene III.

According to Émile Poumon, St. Bernard stayed in Hainaut in 1148, when the abbey was founded. St. Bernard visited Cambron in 1150, by which time the monks were facing significant difficulties. The endowment from Anselm of Trazegnies was contested by his brother Gilles of Silly. However, the abbey managed to win the case. The first abbots were skilled administrators, as well as religious men, who brought together temporal competence and spiritual vigor. Fastré de Gaviamez, the second successor to St. Bernard, was an especially successful abbot.

Shortly after its foundation, the abbey grew substantially. It became one of the wealthiest monasteries of Hainault. It variously founded, or was given the supervision of, several daughter houses: the abbeys of Fontenelle at Valenciennes (1212), Nieuwenbosch near Ghent (1215), Épinlieu at Mons (1216), Beaupré near Mechelen (1221), Le Refuge at Ath (1224), Le Verger at Cambrai (1225) and Baudeloo at Saint-Nicolas (1225).

Two bishops, attracted by the holiness of the site, decided to retire there. Didier, Bishop of Thérouanne, wished to consecrate the last years of his life to prayer and contemplation. He retired to Cambron, where he died in 1196. The other, Henry, was a worldly and corrupt bishop who received a terrifying vision of the punishments of Hell. He reformed himself, renounced his worldly affairs, and spent the rest of his life as a simple monk at Cambron.

When Fastré of Gaviamez was promoted to Clairvaux, Gérard of Burgundy (a relative of St. Bernard) replaced him at Cambron. He retired after eight years. Daniel de Grammont, the Blessed, was elected the third abbot and served until his death in 1196.

=== Century of knowledge ===
At the end of the 13th century, Baudouin of Boussu, Doctor of Theology, was appointed to succeed Thomas d'Aquin at the University of Paris. He wrote a commentary on the "Book of Sentences" and left behind some collections of sermons. As the eleventh abbot of Cambron, he was a great promoter and organizer of theological studies. Cambron has since produced numerous theologians and intellectuals, several of whom enjoy great renown.

=== Our Lady of Cambron ===
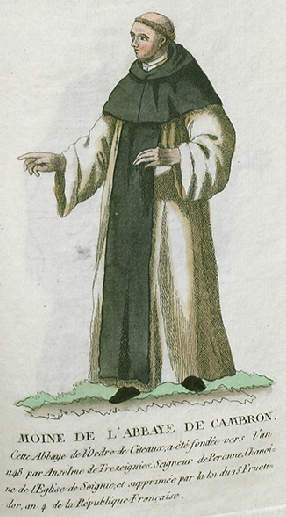
Monk of Cambron Abbey

In 1322, a serious incident occurred at Cambron, where an image of the Virgin Mary was profaned. The widely held suspicion was that a Jewish perpetrator had falsified conversion to Christianity to gain access to the image. The affair caused significant unrest and provoked the sympathy of many Christians. There were ceremonies held to repair the image. Thus, the devotion to Our Lady of Cambron was begun. After a request by the King of France, Philip of Valois, Pope Benedict XII issued a papal bull granting indulgences to pilgrims to Cambron. The pilgrimage to the Virgin of Cambron was thus begun. A solemn procession takes place each year on the third Sunday of Easter.

Among the pilgrims and visitors were several important figures, including the Emperor Maximilian I, who, passing through Belgium in the early 16th century, visited the sanctuary of Our Lady of Cambron. He gave the abbey sufficient funds to commission the restoration of the painted image.

In 1581, under the abbot Robert d'Ostelart, a troop of 600 Huguenots threatened to assault the abbey. However, they left the area without doing any damage. The monks attributed this seemingly miraculous circumstance to the protection of Our Lady of Cambron, which renewed devotion to the Virgin.

=== Renaissance ===
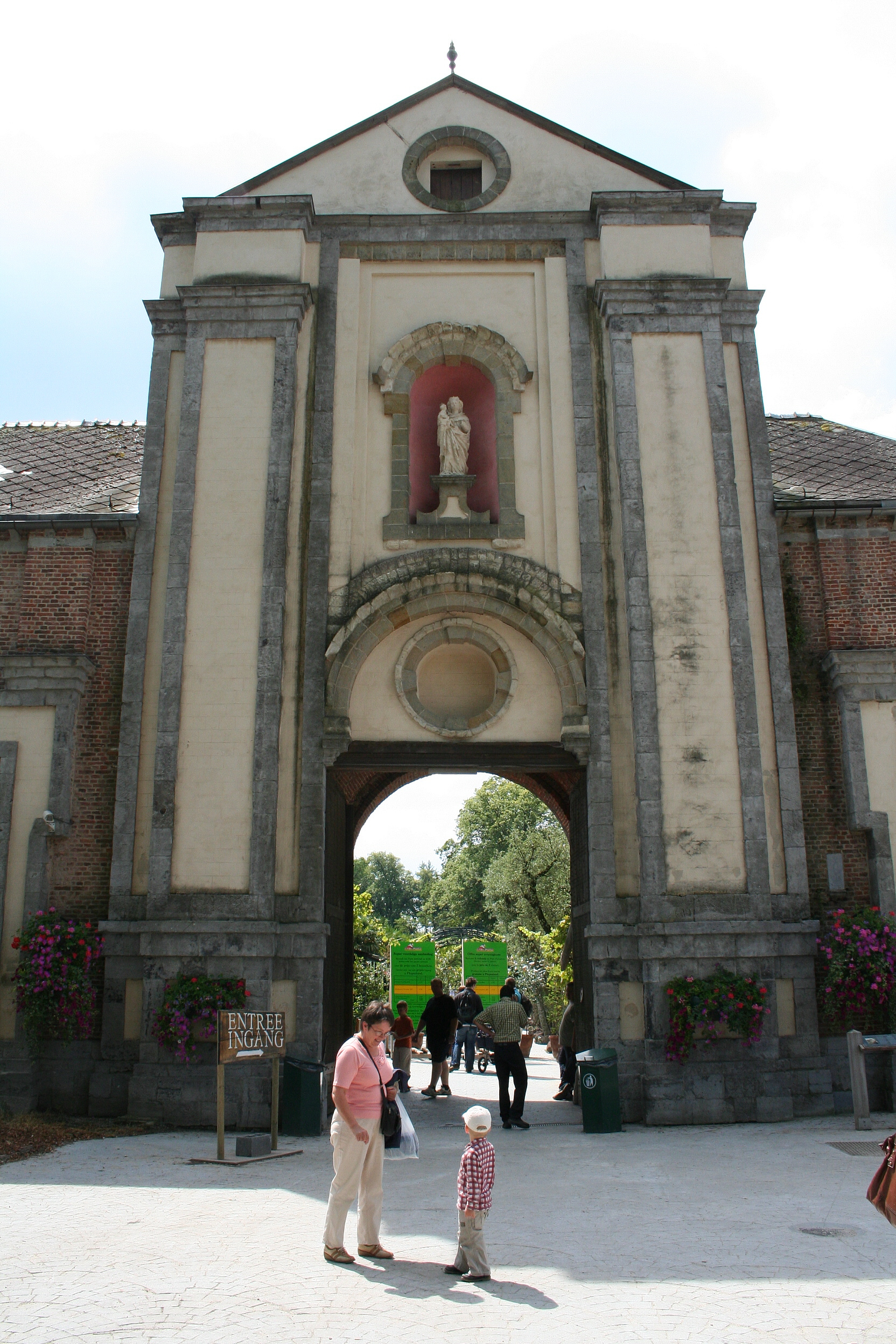
The entrance gate

By the end of the 14th century, there were more than 70 monks at Cambron pursuing the abbey's charitable mission. The monks increasingly recruited the aid of lay-brothers to tend the fields. The contribution of agricultural techniques to the local peasantry substantially improved both the status of the rural class and the local economy.

After facing difficulties in the 15th century, the abbey contributed greatly, in the 16th century, to the renaissance in the arts and theology. The master of novices André Enobarb, a distinguished humanist who corresponded with Erasmus, wrote a Latin tragedy about the miracles of Our Lady of Cambron. The abbot Robert d'Ostelart (d. 1613) supported the college in Ath and provided scholarships for theology students at Leuven. There were many other eminent monks at Cambron. Jean d'Assignies and Gregory de Lattefleur would both later become abbot of Nizelles. Baudouin Moreau, author of a famous commentary on the Rule of St. Benedict, became an emissary of the Cistercian Order in Rome. Jean Farinart, of Chièvres, who succeeded Robert d'Ostelart as abbot, was an excellent theologian and doctor of theology at Douai. Antoine Le Waitte, author of a history of Cambron Abbey (1672), was the abbey's librarian and significantly expanded its collections.

=== 17th and 18th centuries ===
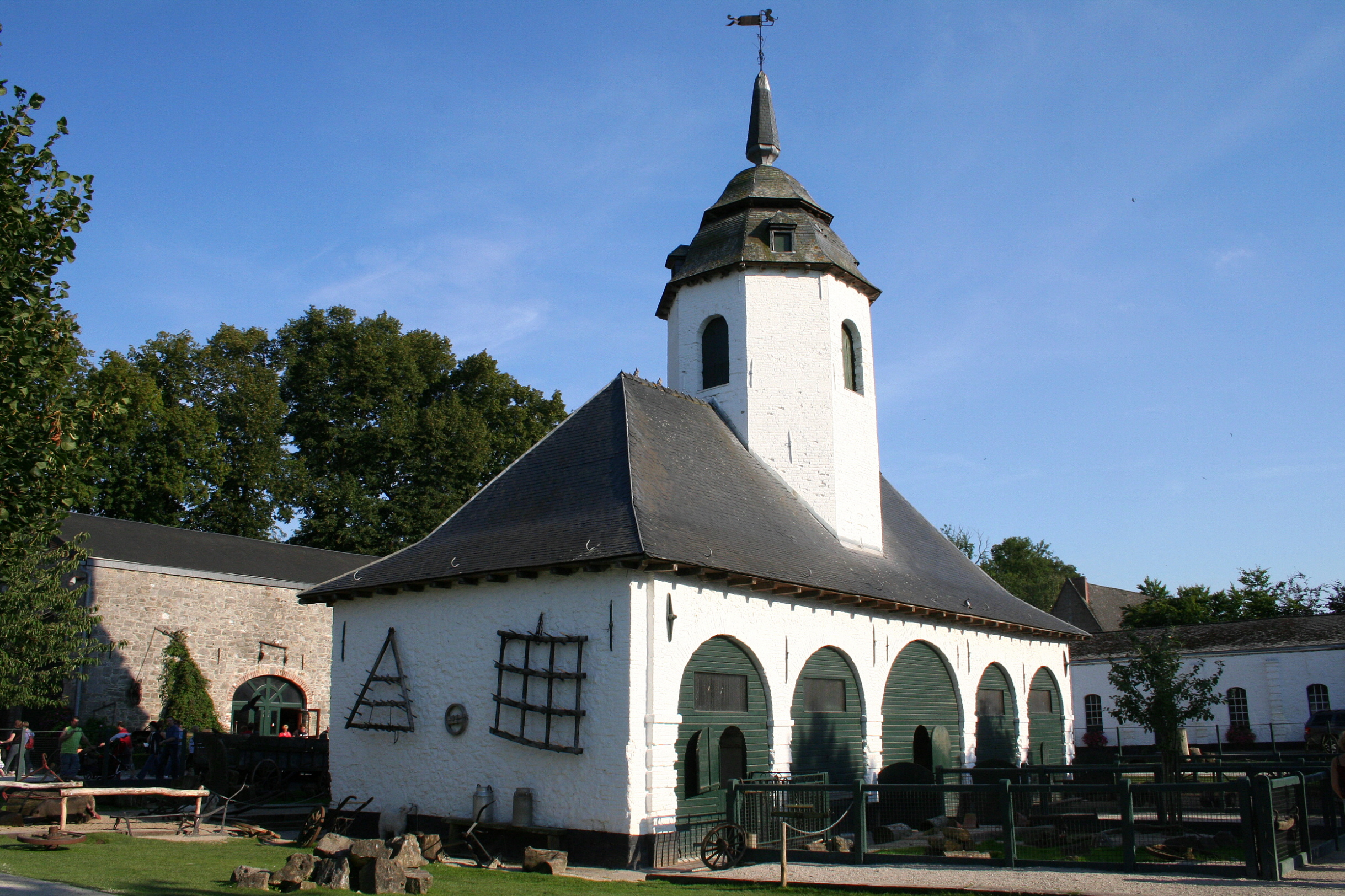
The carriage house

By the 17th century, the abbey had become rich from years of gifts, legacies, and productive agriculture. The abbey enjoyed great renown, but strict adherence to monastic life had begun to loosen. The abbey's wealth attracted the envy of others. At the end of the 17th century, the wars of King Louis XIV devastated the province of Hainaut, marking the beginning of the abbey's first period of decline.

At the beginning of the 18th century, a period of peace allowed for new prosperity and a spate of construction and renovation. The majority of structures still visible at the site today date from this period. The entrance gate of the abbey was given a statuary niche that held an image of the Virgin Mary. The abbey's tower, built under the direction of the architect Jean-François Wincqz, was constructed in a pure Neoclassical style. The carriage house, with five stalls and a dovecote in the center, is unique. The monumental staircase evokes the garden of a palace more than a monastery.

=== Dissolution of the abbey ===
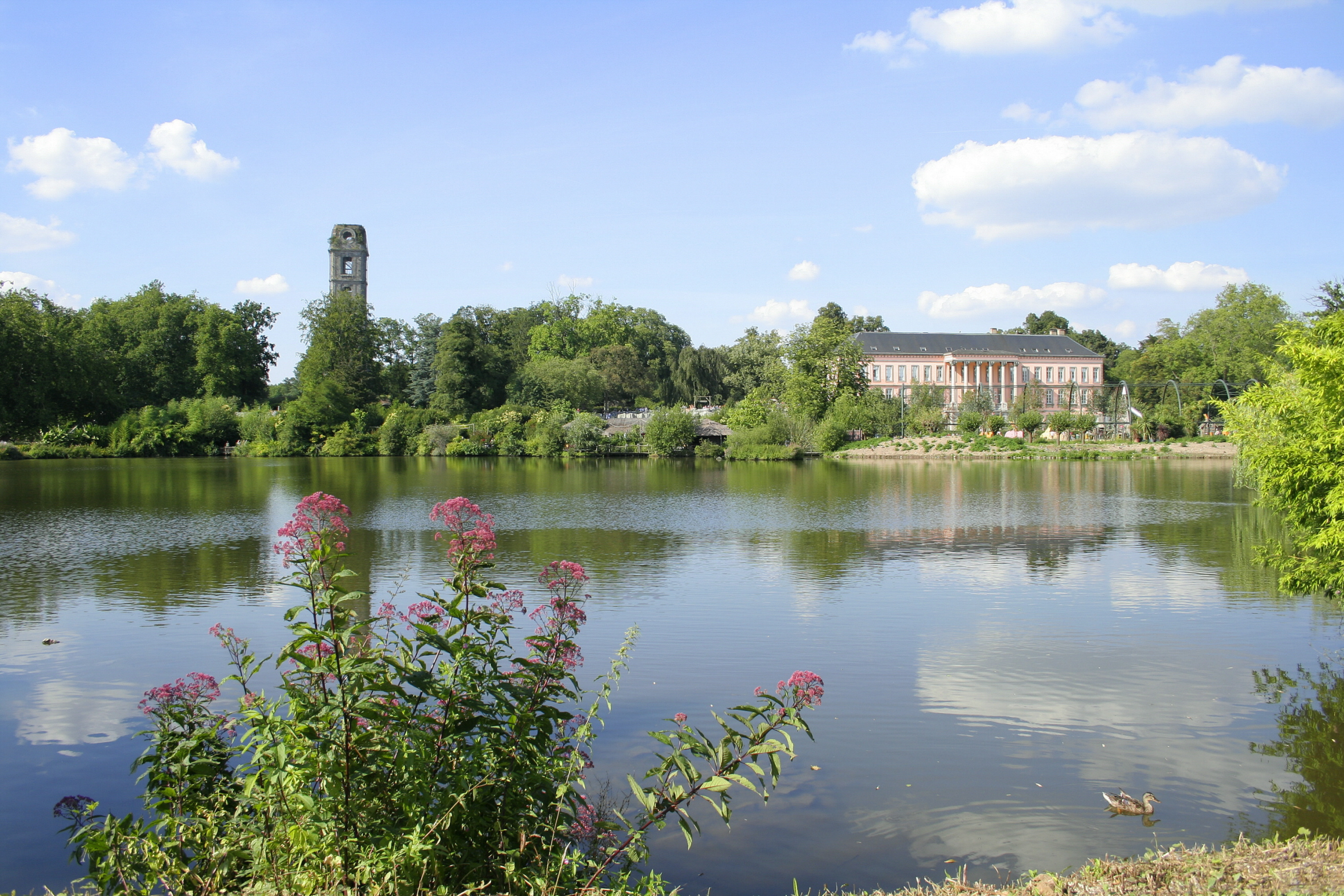
The abbey tower and Château Beaulieu

The abbey was still prosperous in 1782, at which time it had 58 monks. However, in 1783, Holy Roman Emperor Joseph II, the so-called enlightened despot, classified Cambron Abbey as one of the useless monasteries and convents, and it was therefore dissolved. The decision took effect in 1789. On May 27, 1789, the monks were expelled from the abbey and went into exile in the Netherlands.

The waning of Austrian power, hastened by the Brabant Revolution, and the establishment of the short-lived unified Belgian states, allowed the monks to return to the abbey for a time beginning in December 1789. Most of the buildings had already been looted. The subsequent French occupation would put an end to nine centuries of Cistercian life. Expelled by the Revolutionary government, the monks left the abbey for good in 1797. The 44th and final abbot of Cambron, Florent Pépin, died in the Netherlands on November 16, 1795. The abbey's assets were sold, and the succeeding owners tore the buildings down. Elements of the abbey interiors are displayed in the Attre Castle along with the columns from the rood screen, which have been re-erected along the castle's former entrance avenue.

The abbey was later sold to the Counts of Val de Beaulieu, who built a large château on the site and whose property it remained until 1993. In 1982, it was declared a protected area. It was then sold to the Domb family, who established a zoo there, now known as Pairi Daiza.

== Site and buildings ==
Of the abbey buildings there remain the tower of the abbey church of 1774, a monumental staircase of 1776, the entire medieval precinct wall and a 13th-century cellar that was formerly beneath the now-vanished lay brothers' quarters, measuring 12 metres by 18 metres with twelve pointed vaults, the main abbey gateway of 1722 and the former abbey farm with an 18th-century coach house. Remains of the former abbey church are kept in Attre Castle. In Bermeries near Bavay in France, a grange of Cambron is still extant. Other of the monastery's farms remain at Diksmuide, Rosière, Thiennes, Horrues, Wodecq, Rebais, Lombise and Stoppeldijk.

== Sources ==
- Peugniez, Bernard: Routier cistercien (2nd edn.), pp. 471–472. Editions Gaud: Moisenay ISBN 2-84080-044-6.
- C. Monnier, Histoire de l'abbaye de Cambron, Mons, I, 1876; II, 1884.
- Ursmer Berlière, Monasticon belge, I: Provinces de Namur et de Hainaut, Maredsous, 1890–1897, p. 343–357.
- R. Paternotte, Histoire de Notre-Dame de Cambron et de son culte, précédée d'une notice sur l'abbaye, Brussels, 1913.
- J.-M. Canivez, L'Ordre de Cîteaux en Belgique, Forges-lez-Chimay, 1926.
- S. Brigode, R. Brulet, J. Dugnoille et R. Sansen, "L'abbaye cistercienne de Cambron", in Annales du Cercle royal d'Histoire et d'Archéologie d'Ath et de la région et Musées athois, 46, 1976–1977, p. 30–111.
- J. Bastien, Les grandes heures de l'abbaye cistercienne de Cambron, Cambron-Casteau, 1984.
