= List of protected heritage sites in Brugelette =

This table shows an overview of the protected heritage sites in the Walloon town Brugelette. This list is part of Belgium's national heritage.

Object	Year/architect	Town/section	Address	Coordinates	Number^{?}	Image
Attre Castle and outbuildings, and the ensemble formed by the castle, outbuildings and the surrounding area ^{(nl)} ^{(fr)}		Brugelette		50.608496°N 3.840870°E	51012-CLT-0001-01 Info	Kasteel van Attre en de bijgebouwen, te Attre, en het ensemble gevormd door het kasteel, de bijgebouwen en diens omgeving
Artificial rock located in the classified site of Castle Attre to Brugelette ^{(nl)} ^{(fr)}		Brugelette		50.608140°N 3.845336°E	51012-CLT-0002-01 Info	
The bridge, valves and mechanism of the mill called: "Outre la Tout passe" in Brugelette and the ensemble formed by the mill and surrounding land ^{(nl)} ^{(fr)}		Brugelette		50.607629°N 3.831422°E	51012-CLT-0003-01 Info	De brug, kleppen en het mechanisme van de molen zei: "De la passe Tout Outre", in Brugelette en het ensemble gevormd door de molen en het omliggende land
The various buildings of the former abbey of Cambron-Casteau, namely the courtyard west of the entrance (18th-19th century), with the exception of the workshop, and the neo-classical castle built by architect Limburg in 1854 and the ensemble formed by various buildings in the area of the old abbey of Cambron-Casteau and surrounding areas ^{(nl)} ^{(fr)}		Brugelette		50.587163°N 3.885227°E	51012-CLT-0004-02 Info	De verschillende gebouwen van de voormalige abdij van Cambron-Casteau, namelijk de binnenplaats ten westen van de ingang (18e - 19e eeuw), met uitzondering van de werkplaats, en het neo-klassieke kasteel gebouwd door architect Limburg in 1854 en het ensemble gevormd door de verschillende gebouwen in het gebied van de oude abdij van Cambron-Casteau en de omliggende gebieden
Church ("St. Vincent") to Cambron-Casteau ^{(nl)} ^{(fr)}		Brugelette		50.589488°N 3.879425°E	51012-CLT-0006-01 Info	Kerk ('Saint-Vincent') te Cambron-Casteau
The facades and roofs of the old monastery of the Carmelites and the house in 1830, merged with the former convent ^{(nl)} ^{(fr)}		Brugelette		50.592678°N 3.859460°E	51012-CLT-0007-01 Info	
The facades and roofs of the castle Attre and interior of the building parts: the vestibule and its oratory, the great summer room, the room occupied by the grand staircase, the Chinese Room (comprising the curtains, original seats and matching seats), the lounge of the Archdukes (including original seats), the room of Marie-Christine and her boudoir, the winter parlor, dining room and upstairs, the library and games room as well as facades, walls and roofs of the two pavilions at the entrance and the site of the castle park. ^{(nl)} ^{(fr)}		Brugelette		50.608496°N 3.840870°E	51012-PEX-0001-01 Info	De gevels en daken van het kasteel Attre en interieur van de gebouwen delen: de vestibule en zijn oratorium, de grote zomerkamer, de kamer bezet door de grote trap, de Chinese Kamer (omvattende de gordijnen, originele stoelen en bijpassende zetels), de salon van de aartshertogen (inclusief originele zetels), de kamer van Marie-Christine en haar boudoir, de wintersalon, de eetkamer en, boven, de bibliotheek en een speelkamer, alsook de gevels, muren en daken van de twee paviljoens bij de entree en de site van het kasteelpark.
Artificial rock located in the classified site of Castle Attre ^{(nl)} ^{(fr)}		Brugelette		50.608140°N 3.845336°E	51012-PEX-0002-01 Info	

== See also ==
- List of protected heritage sites in Hainaut (province)
- Brugelette
