= Attre =

Attre may refer to:

- Rashid Attre (1919–1967), Pakistani film score composer
- Wajahat Attre (1945–2017), Pakistani music director
- Attre Castle, a castle in Brugelette, Wallonia, Belgium
