= Boschkapelle =

- Former municipality and village
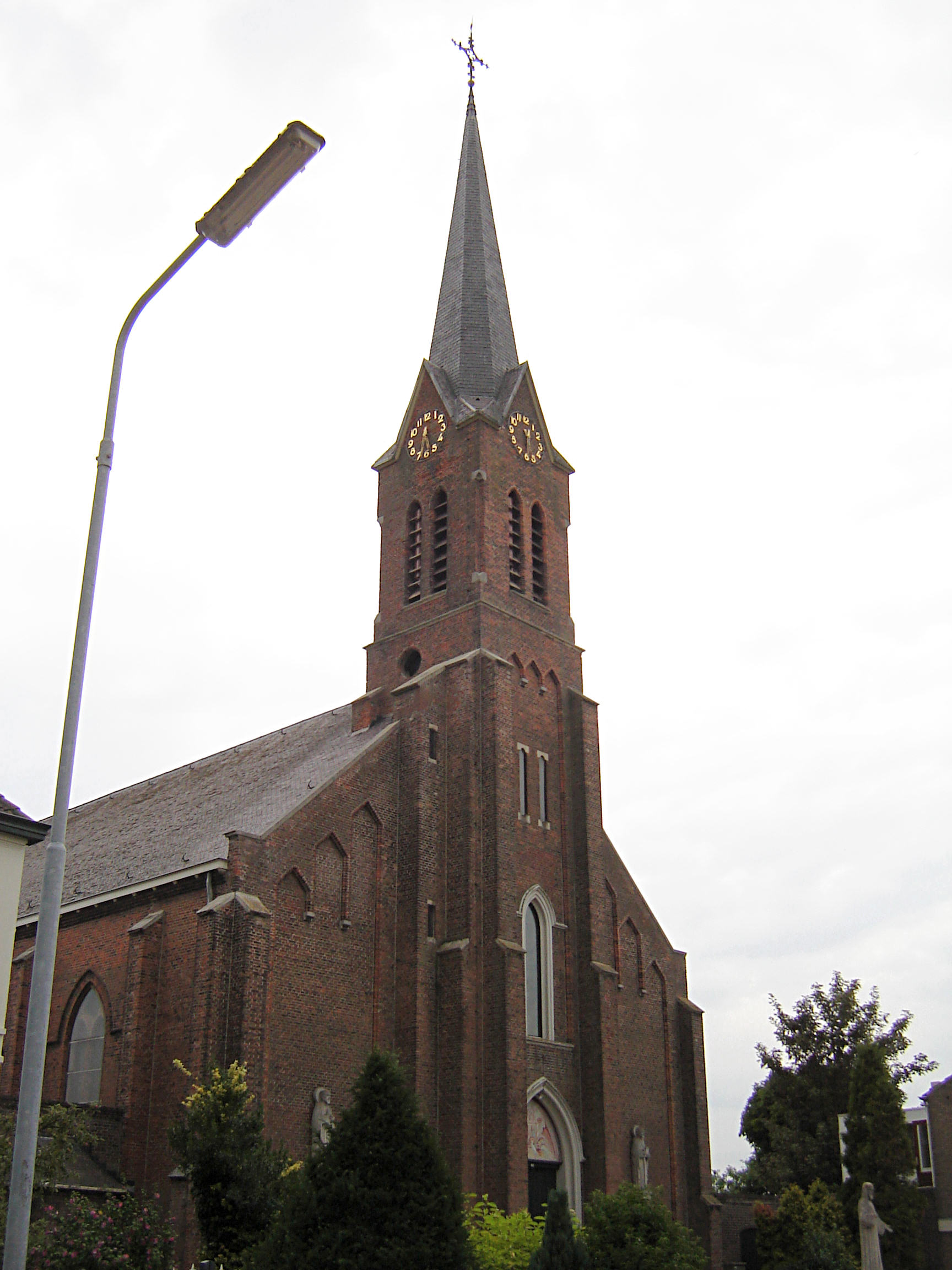
- Peter and Paul Church

- Flag Coat of arms

- Location in the province of Zeeland in the Netherlands Boschkapelle (Netherlands)
- Coordinates: 51°19′32″N 3°58′10″E
- Country: Netherlands
- Province: Zeeland
- Municipality: Hulst

Area
  - Total: 0.61 km^{2} (0.24 sq mi)
- Elevation: 1.6 m (5.2 ft)

Population (2021)
  - Total: 980
  - Density: 1,600/km^{2} (4,200/sq mi)
- Time zone: UTC+1 (CET)
  - Summer (DST): UTC+2 (CEST)
- Postal code: 4581
- Dialing code: 0114

Boschkapelle is a former village and municipality in the Netherlands. It is now part of the village of Vogelwaarde.

Boschkapelle was home to 375 people in 1840. The municipality of Boschkapelle consisted of the village itself, and the neighbouring villages of Kamperhoek and Stoppeldijkveer. In 1936, it merged with the municipality of Stoppeldijk to form the new municipality of Vogelwaarde. The two villages however stayed separate, until they merged in about 1970.
