= Vogelwaarde =

- Village
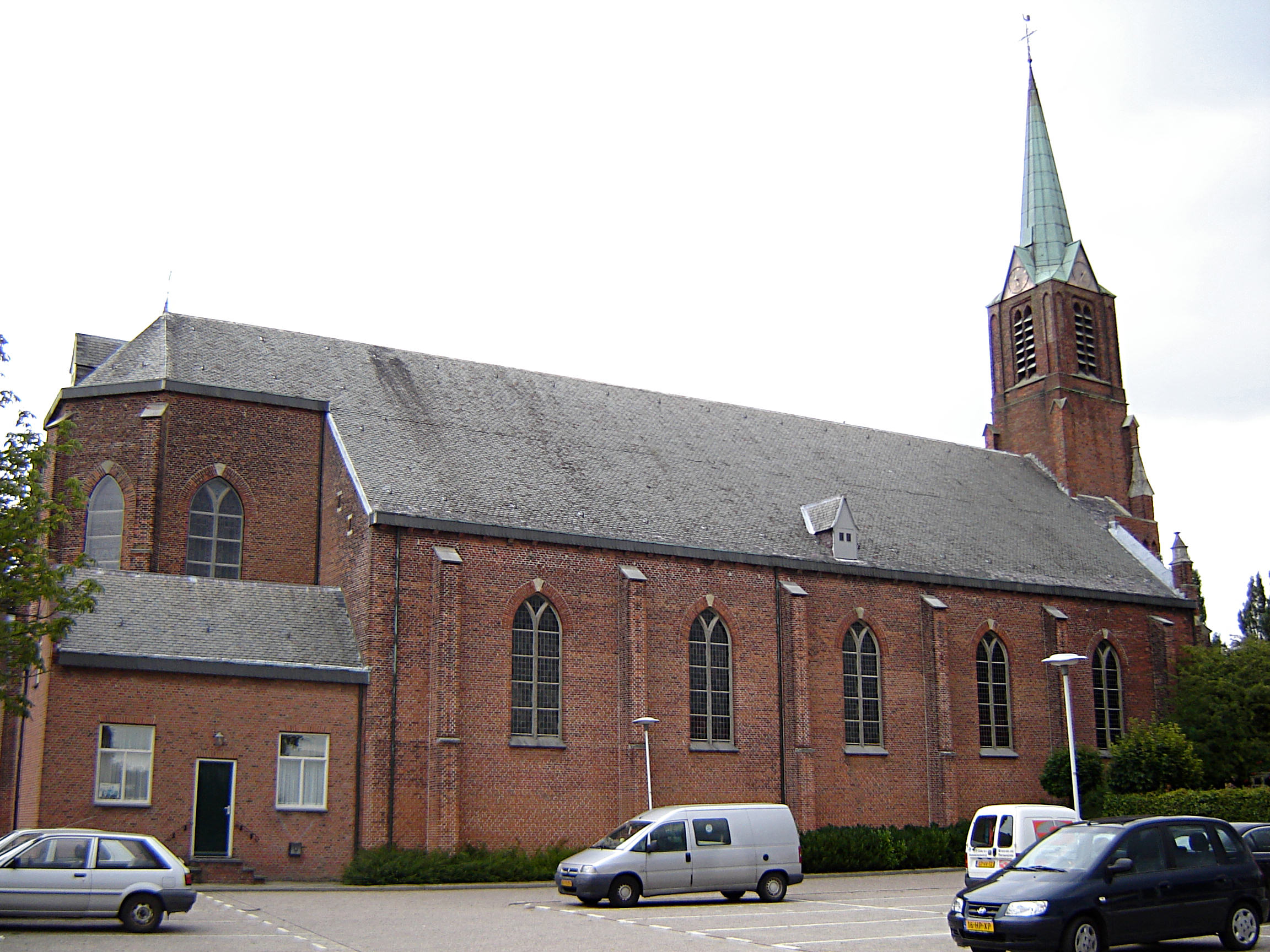
- Saint Gerulphus Church

- Coat of arms

- Location in the province of Zeeland in the Netherlands Vogelwaarde (Netherlands)
- Coordinates: 51°19′32″N 3°58′13″E
- Country: Netherlands
- Province: Zeeland
- Municipality: Hulst

Area
  - Total: 14.34 km^{2} (5.54 sq mi)
- Elevation: 1.6 m (5.2 ft)

Population (2021)
  - Total: 1,865
  - Density: 130.1/km^{2} (336.8/sq mi)
- Time zone: UTC+1 (CET)
  - Summer (DST): UTC+2 (CEST)
- Postal code: 4581
- Dialing code: 0114

Vogelwaarde is a village in the Dutch province of Zeeland. It is a part of the municipality of Hulst, and lies about 29 km southwest of Bergen op Zoom.

== History ==
The village was first mention in 1936 as Vogelwaarde, and is a combination of "land on water" and the stream Vogel. The village was formed in 1970 from the former villages Boschkapelle and Stoppeldijk. Both villages were located in the Stoppeldijkpolder. In 1645, the Boschkapelle, a chapel, was built which became a site of pilgrimage for the Martyrs of Gorkum in 1761.

The St Gerulphus is a three-aisled church with needle spire which was constructed between 1860 and 1861. The church burnt down in 1869, and was rebuilt and enlarged the next year. The St Paul and Peter Church was built between 1875 and 1876, and used to be located in Boschkapelle.

In 1936, the villages of Stoppeldijk and Boschkapelle formed the municipality of Vogelwaarde. Vogelwaarde was a separate municipality from 1936 to 1970, when it was merged with Hontenisse. In 2003, it became part of the municipality of Hulst.

The village has one of the few horseshoe factories in Europe. It was founded in 1906.
