= Pairi Daiza =

Zoo and botanical garden in Brugelette, Belgium

- Pairi Daiza logo

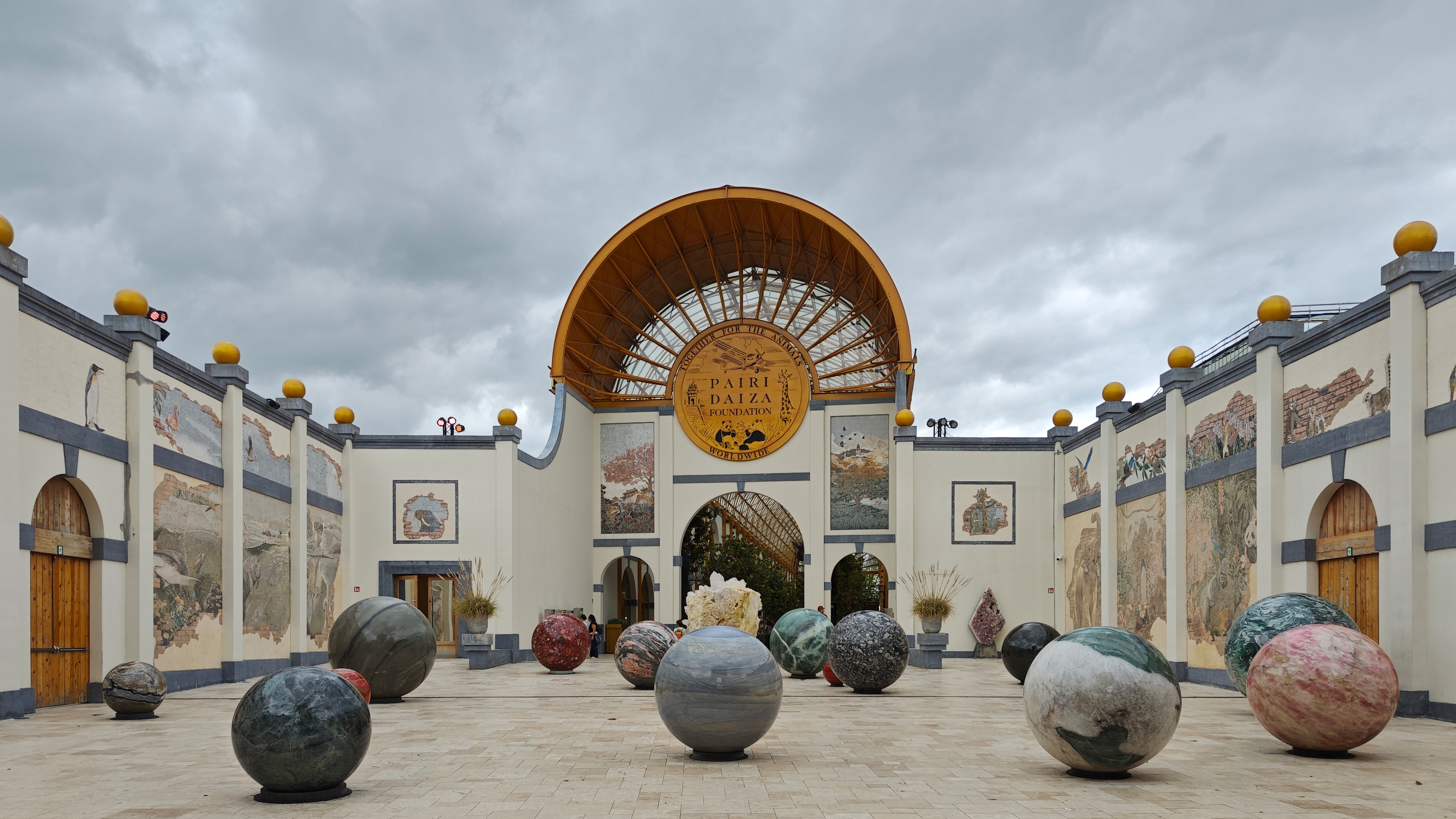
- Reception Hall
- Interactive map of Pairi Daiza
- 50°35′5″N 3°53′14″E
- Date opened: 1993
- Location: Brugelette, Belgium
- Land area: 75 hectares (190 acres)
- No. of animals: 7,000+
- Annual visitors: 2,000,000 (2018)
- Memberships: EAZA, Species360
- Website: www.pairidaiza.eu

Pairi Daiza (French pronunciation: [pɛʁi daiza]; formerly Paradisio) is a privately owned zoo and botanical garden located in Brugelette, Hainaut, Belgium. The 75-hectare (190-acre) large animal theme park is located on the site of the former Cistercian Cambron Abbey, and is home to over 7,000 animals. The name is taken from the Avestan word pairi daēza, which is the source of the Persian word paradise.

Pairi Daiza is owned and operated by Pairi Daiza Belgium SA, a limited company previously listed on NYSE Alternext Brussels (code: PARD). It is a member of the European Association of Zoos and Aquaria (EAZA), and participates in the European Endangered Species Programme (EEP).

== History ==
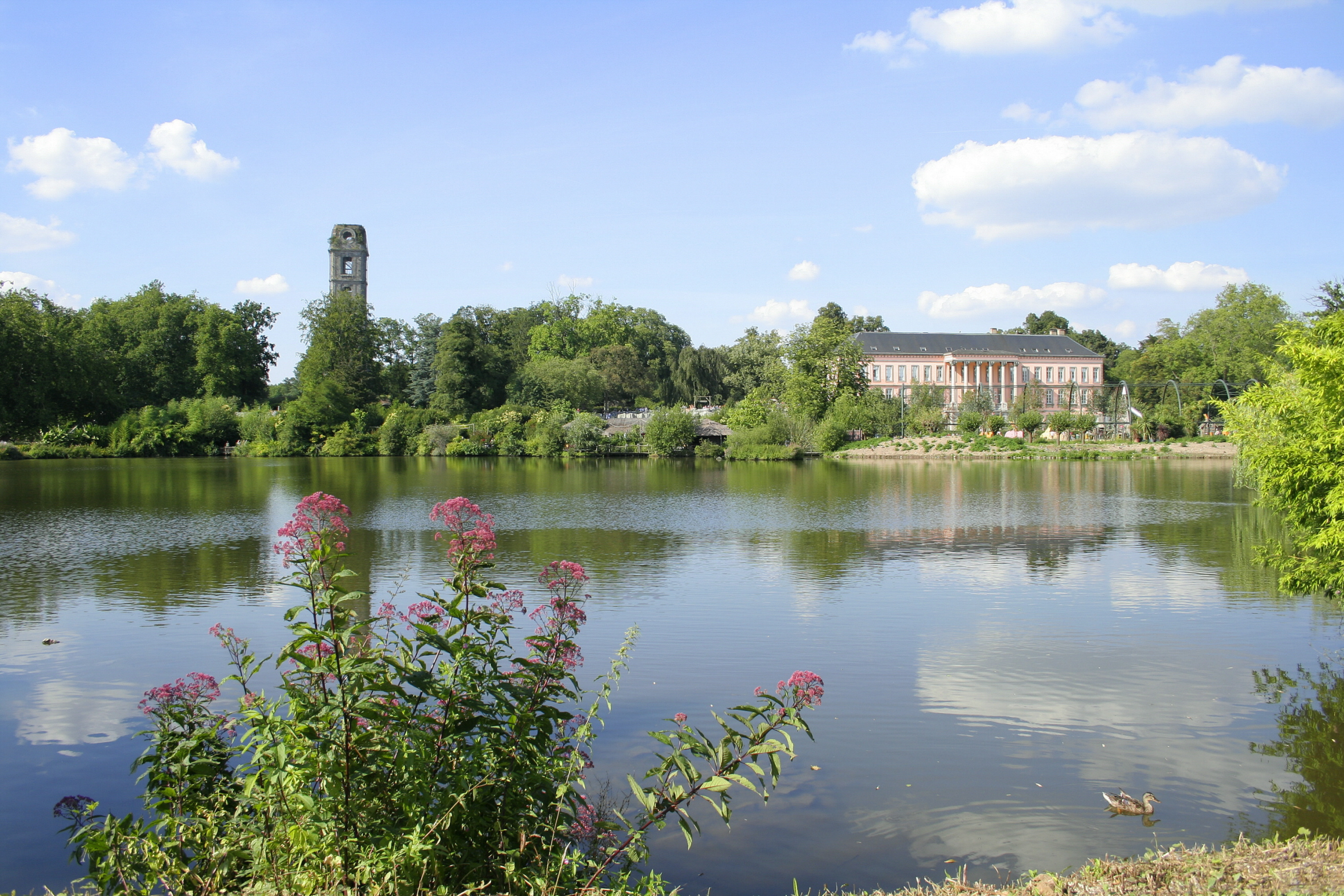
The abbey tower and Château Beaulieu

In 1148, Bernard, Abbot of Clairvaux (later Saint Bernard), sent twelve Cistercian monks to Cambron at the invitation of Anselm of Trazegnies, who had offered them land at the edge of the river Dender. After the abbey was dissolved, the family of the counts of the Val de Beaulieu purchased the property and built a castle, which remained in the family until purchased by the Domb family, who founded the park. The entire property has been a protected area since 1982.

The zoo was opened in 1993 as a bird garden named Paradisio. By 2000, the zoo included the Oasis, a large greenhouse that was home to other animals including meerkats, otters, and alligators. In 2001, the zoo opened the Nautilus (aquarium), the Madidi Islands (squirrel monkeys), and Nosy Komba (lemurs), followed by Algoa Bay (brown fur seals) in 2002.

The zoo created a series of suspension bridges in 2004 that let visitors see the exhibits from above. The "Dream of Han Wu Di" opened in 2006, and is the largest Chinese garden in Europe. A series of aviaries opened in 2007, showcasing raptors.

In 2009, the zoo opened the 4-hectare (9.9-acre) "Kingdom of Ganesha", an Indonesian-themed garden. It also changed its name to Pairi Daiza, which means "walled garden" or "orchard protected by walls"—the oldest name for paradise. In August 2009, the Indonesian government sent a pair of Sumatran elephants to enliven the Indonesian section, the country's first endangered animal breeding loan program to Europe.

Since April 2014, Pairi Daiza hosts a couple of two giant pandas that are on loan from China for 15 years.

== Worlds ==
=== Cambron-Abbey ===
Tower of the former abbey

This was the original section at the park's opening, encompassing the ruins of Cambron Abbey. Adjacent to this area are the main entrance and a reconstruction of the abbey's former brewery, which dates back to 1775 and where five different types of beer are brewed today. Also located within this area are the Pinnawala Express steam train station, a 7,000-square-metre (75,000 sq ft) tropical hall (The Oasis), and a rose garden. The animal population includes, for example, bear cuscuses, giant anteaters, naked mole rats, Angora goats, as well as bats, which are kept in the abbey's crypt.

=== Cambron-by-the-Sea ===
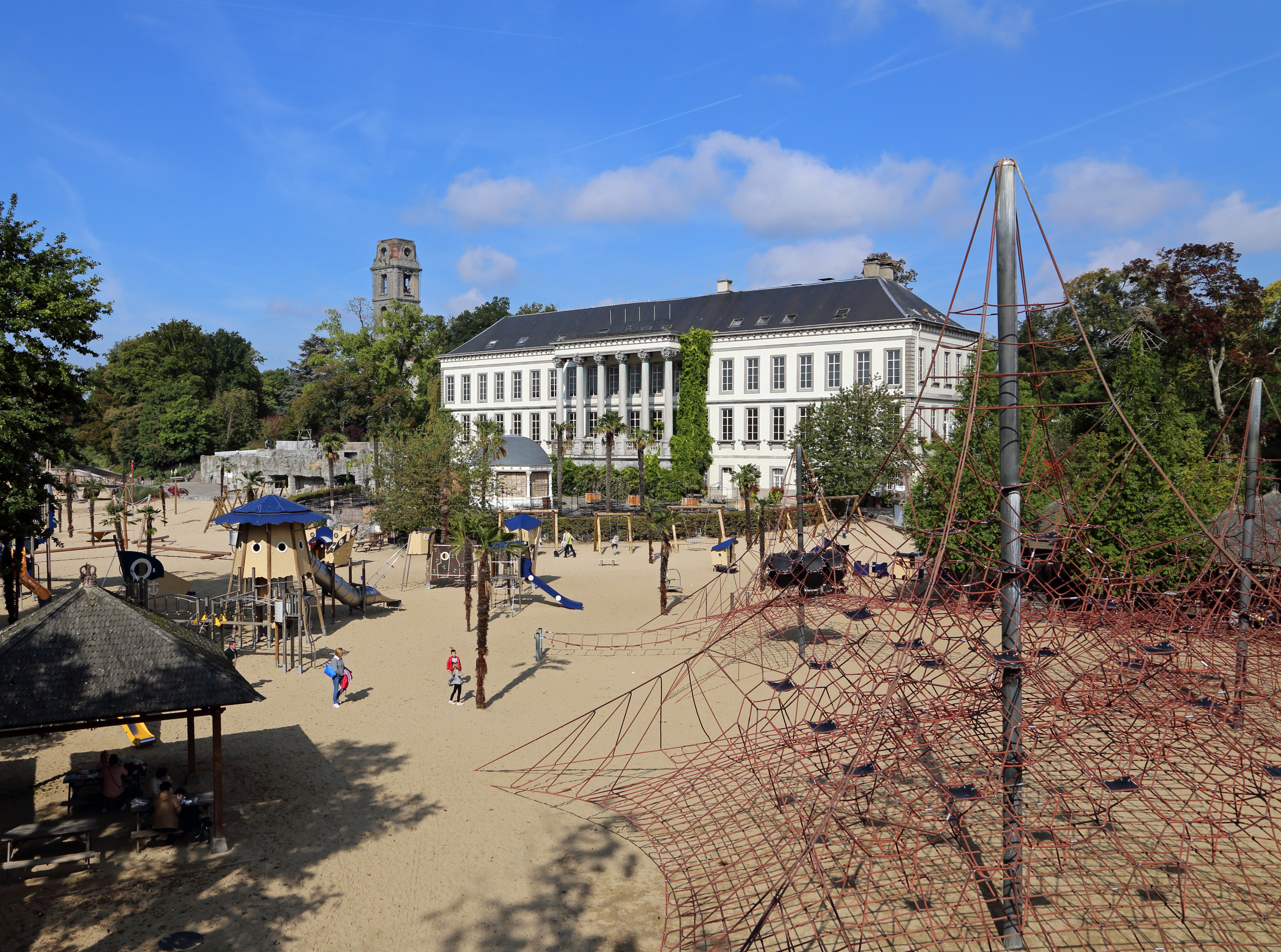
Playground with the château in the background

This section focuses on the aquarium at the Château de Cambron. It also includes a replica lighthouse, a large children's playground, and walk-through enclosures for African penguins and seals. The aquarium's fish population includes surgeonfish, axolotls, and various species of sharks.

=== The Middle Kingdom ===
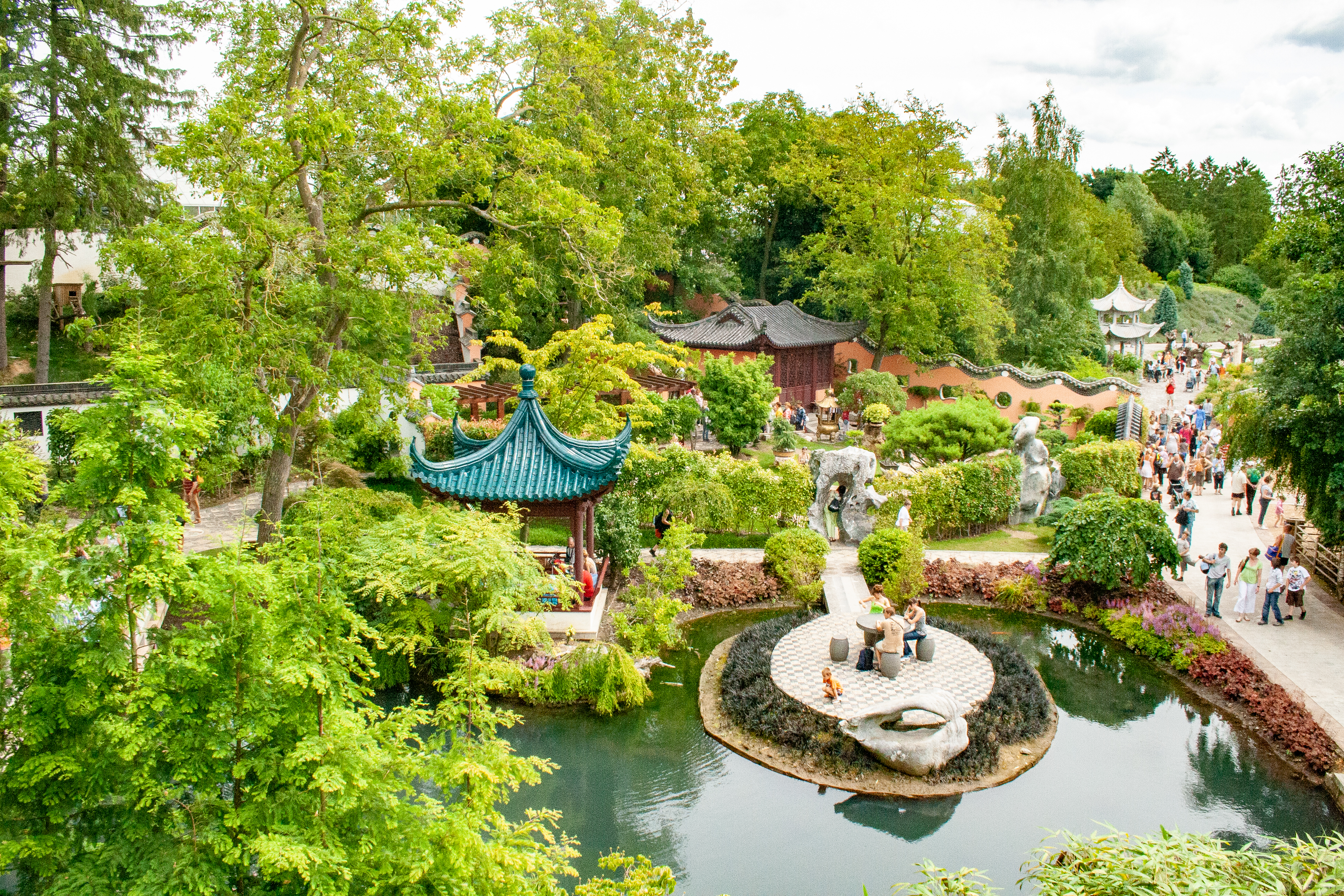
The Middle Kingdom

The Middle Kingdom, also called "The Dream of Han Wu Di", opened in 2006. Covering an area of over 45,000 square metres (480,000 sq ft), it is the largest Chinese garden in Europe. In addition to its Chinese-themed buildings, waterfalls, rocks, and plants, it is home to cranes, red pandas, and muntjak. In 2011, six Carrara marble pools containing Garra rufa were added (an attraction nicknamed the "pedicure fish" of Dr. Yu's Clinic, which offers to clean visitors' feet). There is also a Vietnamese/Cambodian restaurant, the Temple of Delights.

=== The Kingdom of Ganesha ===
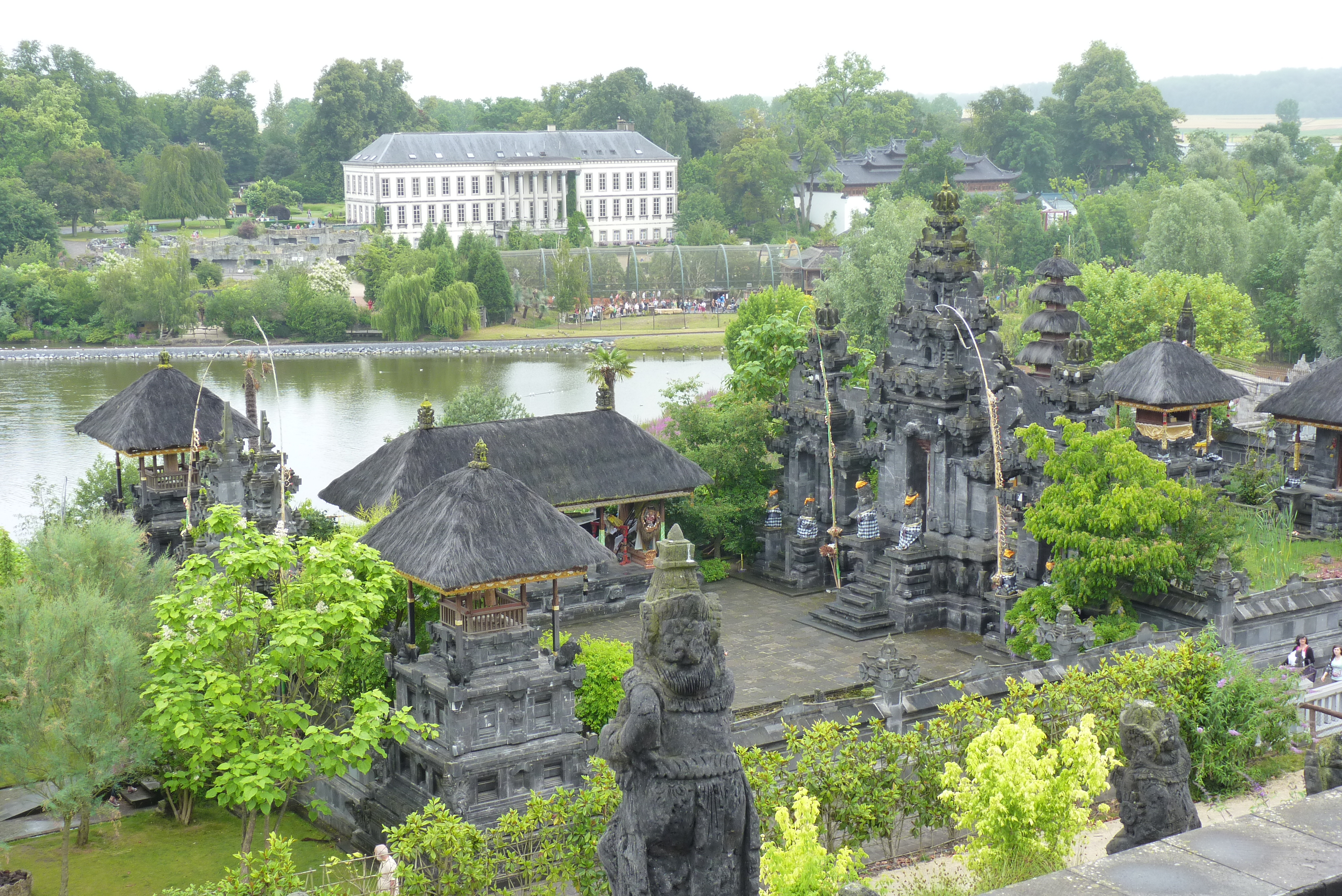
The Kingdom of Ganesha

The four-hectare (9.9-acre) Kingdom of Ganesha, which was opened in 2009, is the largest Indonesian garden in Europe, and reproduces the plant life and feel of the Indonesian archipelago, particularly Bali. Its collections include Pura Agung Shanti Buwana Balinese Hindu temple, East Nusa Tenggara and Toraja traditional houses and miniature replicas of Borobudur and Prambanan temples. The animal population in this area includes, among others, the largest herd of Asian elephants in a European zoo, Bengal tigers, two groups of orangutans kept together with otters, and Komodo dragons.

=== The Land of Origins ===
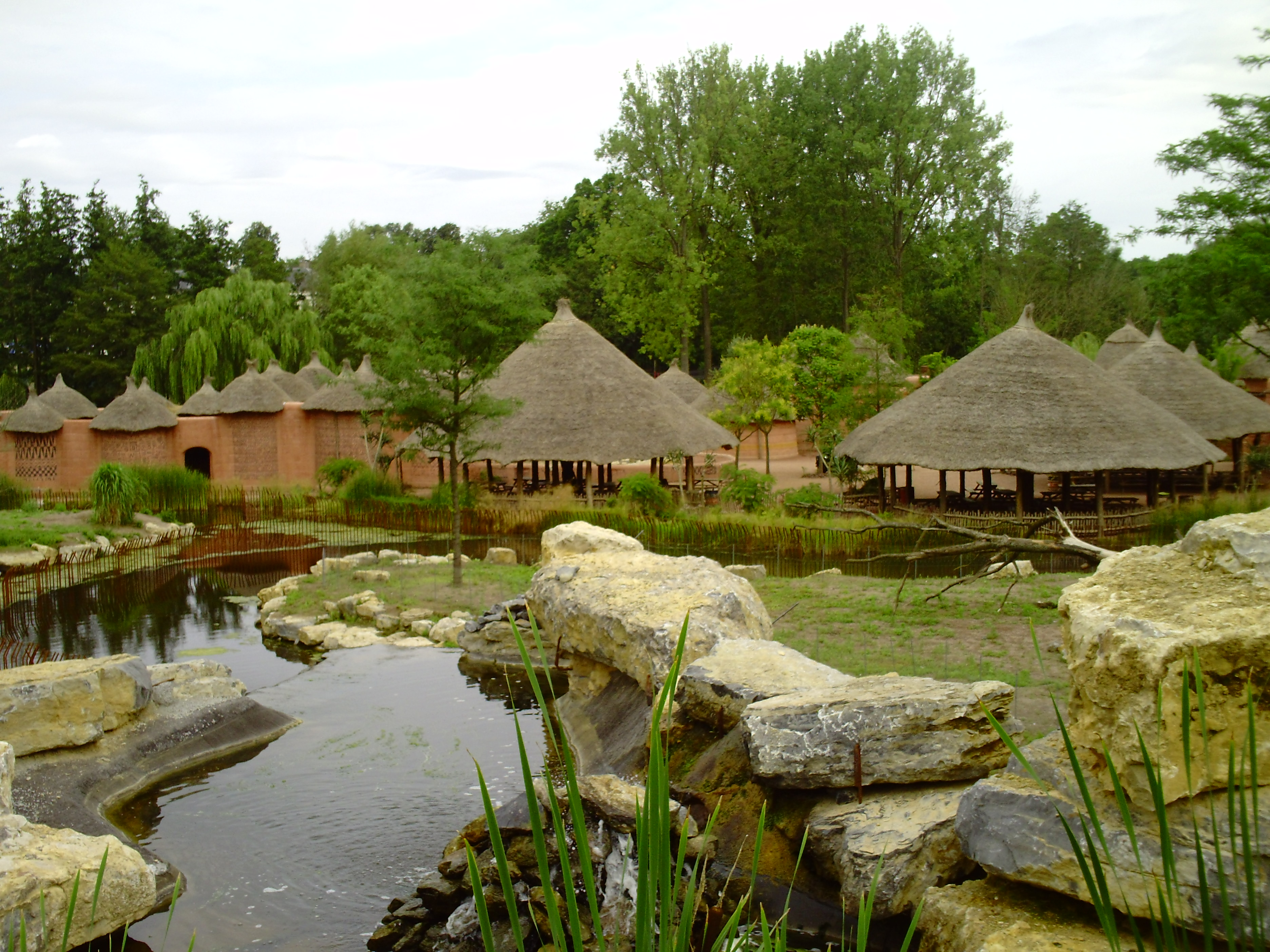
The African village in the Land of Origins

This African-themed area houses the giraffe enclosure, various display terrariums, and a restaurant. It also includes replicas of two African villages. The animals kept there include white rhinoceroses, hippopotamuses, and two groups of gorillas in enclosures designed to resemble volcanic islands. Ring-tailed lemurs are kept in a contact enclosure on another island.

=== The Southern Cape ===
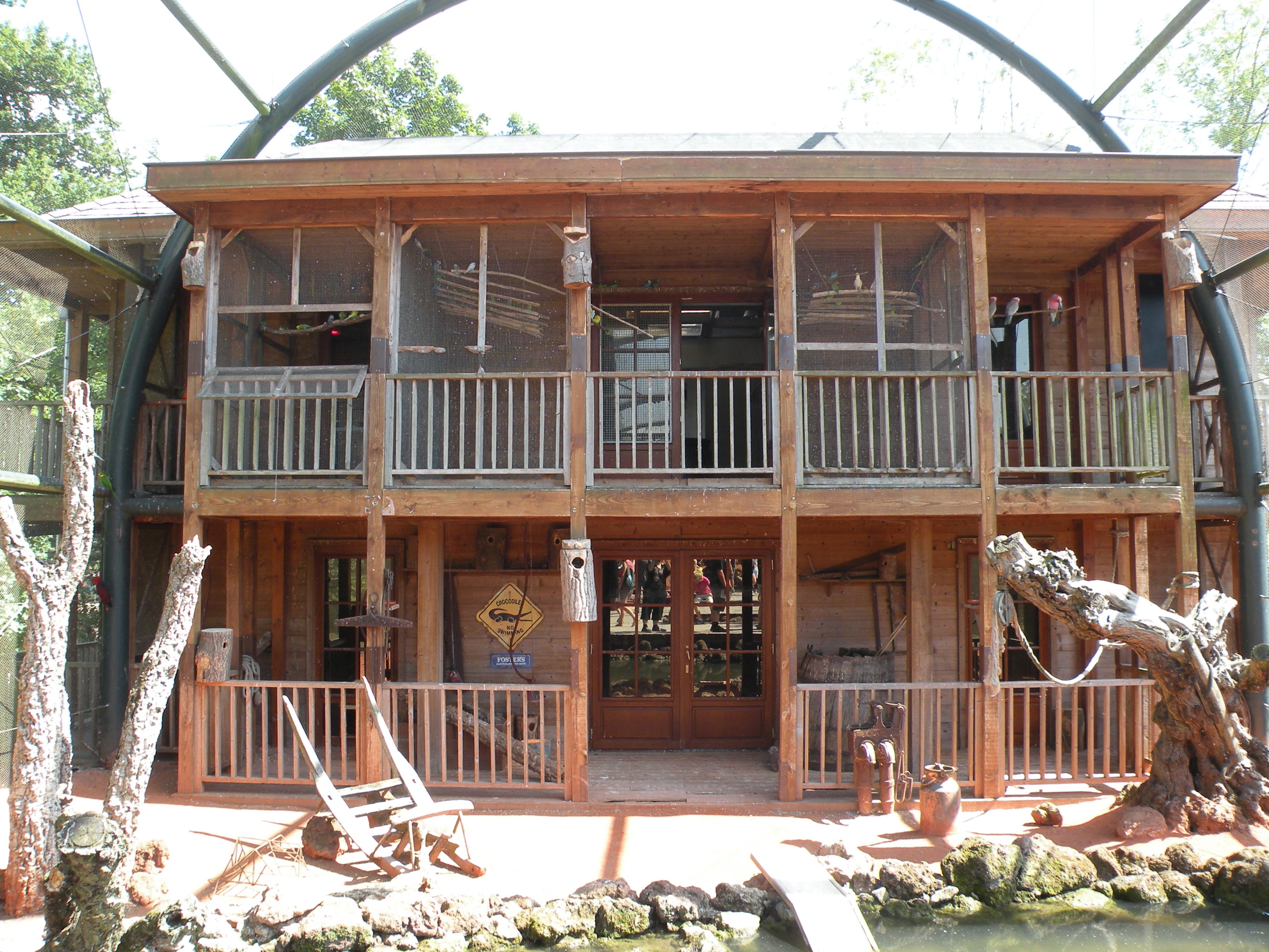
The aviary in Southern Cape

This small themed area showcases the flora and fauna of Oceania. Besides various kangaroos in a petting enclosure, there is a walk-through aviary with Australian birds. Koalas, cassowaries, and Tasmanian devils are also among the animals on display.

=== The Last Frontier ===
The Last Frontier is modeled after the Canadian province of British Columbia and showcases the flora and fauna of North America. Opened in 2019, this area covers approximately 8 hectares (20 acres) with nearly 1,000 spruce and larch trees and includes an enclosure housing a mixed group of gray wolves and brown bears, which can also be viewed from the bedrooms of the vacation homes. Other animals kept there include moose, black bears, and Steller sea lions.

=== The Land of the Cold ===
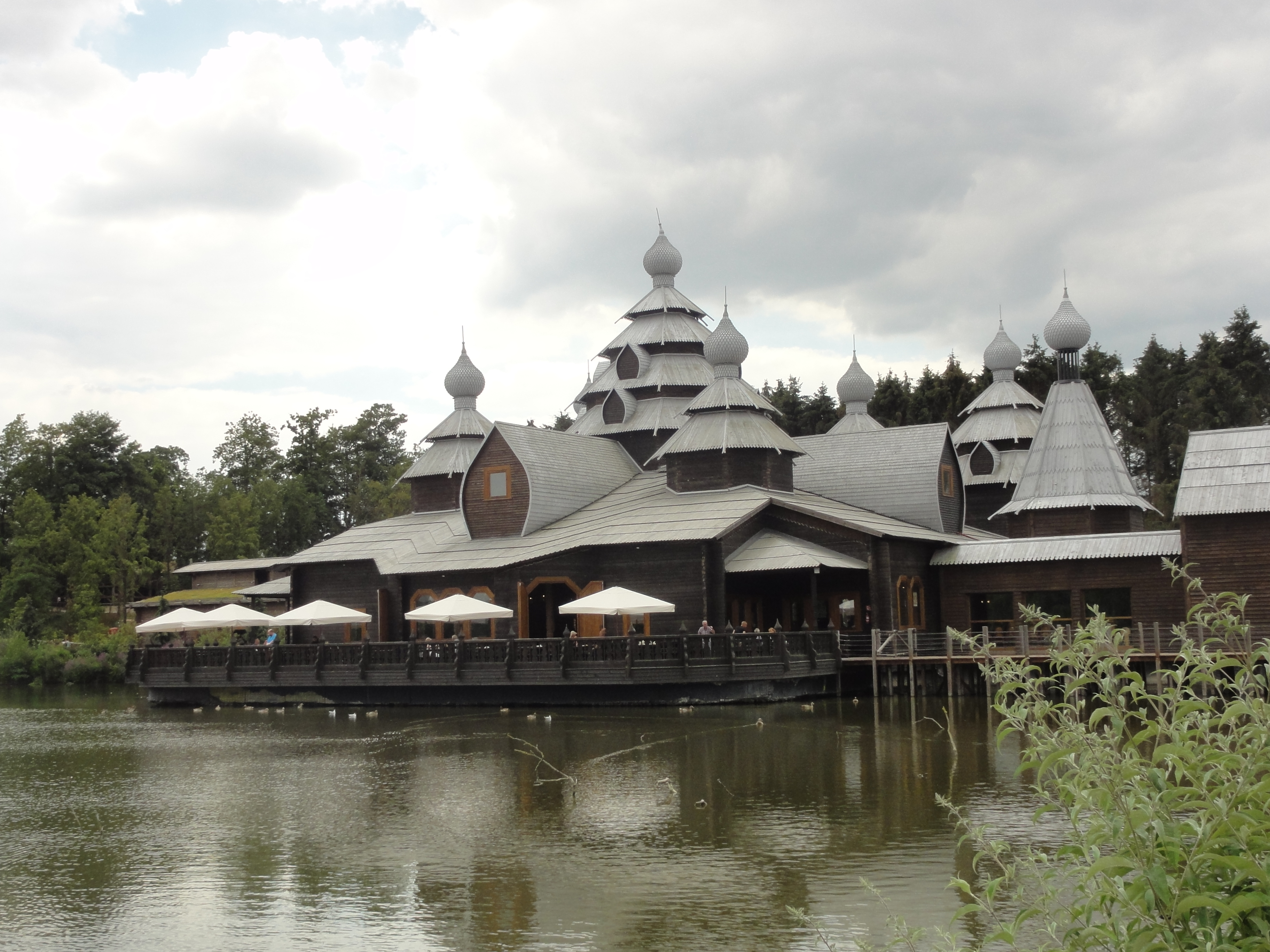
Izba restaurant in the Land of the Cold

This 18-hectare (44-acre) Antarctic and Arctic-themed area features enclosures for reindeer, Northern raccoons and American bison. It offers additional overnight accommodation options with views into the underground emperor penguin cave, as well as the polar bear and walrus enclosures. The section also features a replica mining tunnel with an exhibition on Inuit life, a train museum and waterplane hangar, as well as a Russian-themed restaurant designed in the style of an izba.

=== The Islands of the Rising Sun ===
The Islands of the Rising Sun, opened in 2024, was created by land reclamation in the central lake to celebrate the park's 30th anniversary. The four resulting islands correspond to the four main Japanese islands of Honshu, Hokkaido, Shikoku, and Kyushu. Designed in the style of a Japanese garden, the area showcases Japanese flora and fauna, traditional Japanese architecture, a miniature Mount Fuji, a Zen garden, the Married Rocks, and wood carvings by Katsushika Hokusai. Among the animals kept there are sika deer, siamangs, raccoon dogs, and red-crowned cranes. The area covers approximately 1 hectare (2.5 acres), making it the smallest of the worlds.

=== Edenya ===
The central part of Edenya

Edenya, opened in 2026, is a four-hectare covered tropical garden and the tenth world added. It is the largest in the world with several systems to ensure a constant tropical climate. It houses animals such as jaguars, Caribbean manatees, pygmy hippopotamuses, giant otters, lowland tapirs and capybaras. Besides animals, the greenhouse is filled with a collection of 435 ancient objects, minerals and fossils, more than 5,000 cacti and euphorbias, and nearly 1,800 plant species. Additional accommodations were added, as well as two new restaurants. The world features activities such as a butterfly garden, suspended walkways and subaquatic caves.

== Exhibits ==
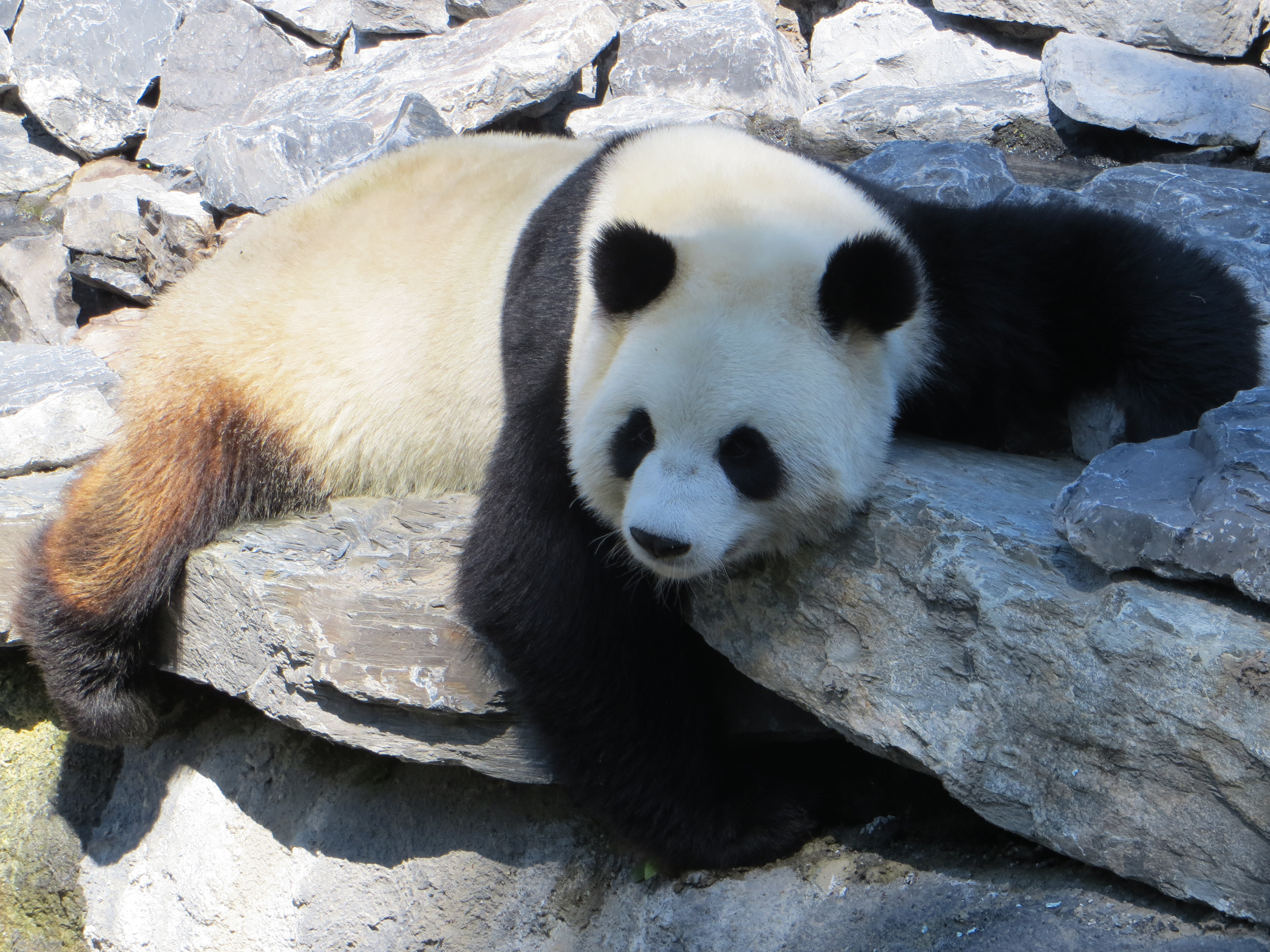
Giant panda at Pairi Daiza

=== Algoa Bay ===
Algoa Bay is home to the zoo's harbour seals and penguins. Visitors can watch the animals from above the water, or from an underwater viewing area where they may come face to face with residents of the exhibit.

=== The Nautilus ===
The Nautilus is an exhibit that is themed after Twenty Thousand Leagues Under the Seas. It includes exhibits with coral reefs, lagoons, and tropical waters, and is home to sea urchins, starfish, anemones, crabs, and jellyfish. Visitors can touch the stingrays, and can watch sharks, moray eels, and sea turtles.

=== The Cathedral Aviary ===
One of the largest aviaries in Europe, this exhibit is home to birds including scarlet ibis, American flamingos, cattle egrets, hamerkops, storks, and vulturine guineafowl.

=== Mersus Emergo ===
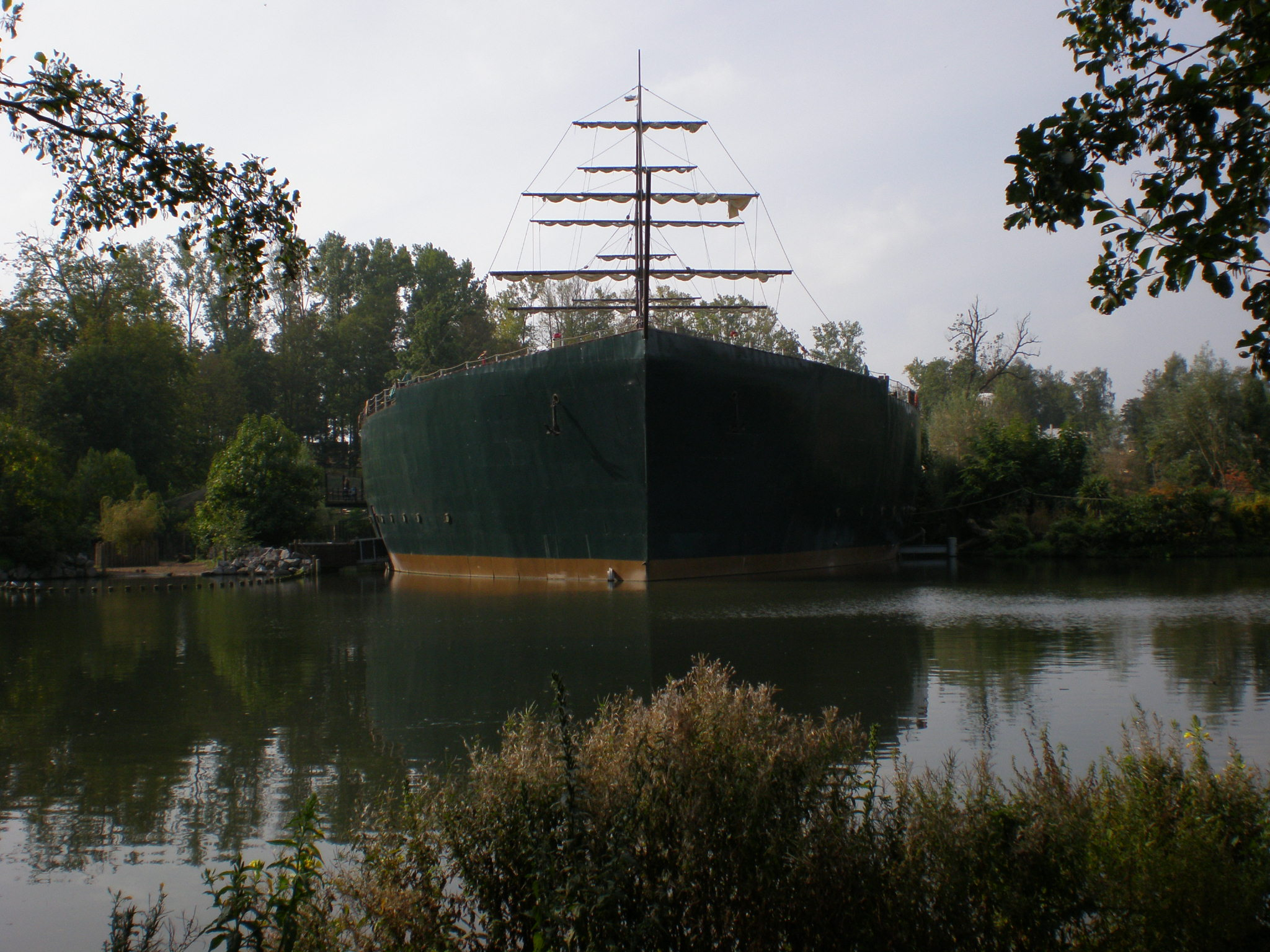
The Mersus Emergo

The Mersus Emergo exhibit is a replica of the English whaling vessel Mersus Emergo that was used for 40 years, from 1870 to 1914. The exhibit opened in 2003 and includes the "SOS Biodiversity" exhibit, created in collaboration with the World Wildlife Fund (WWF), which highlights current threats to the planet and ways in which visitors can take action to help minimize these threats. The "ship" also includes the zoo's rescue center for animals such as pythons, boas, iguanas, turtles, and alligators that were handed over or abandoned by former owners who could no longer care for them. The lake and island surrounding the exhibit is home to shoebills.

=== The Oasis ===
This 7,000-square-metre (75,000 sq ft) greenhouse with waterfalls includes tropical plants such as bamboo, vines, banana trees, and hibiscus, and is home to animals including toucanets, bear cuscuses, dwarf mongoose, hornbills, and southern bald ibises.

=== Falconry Village ===
This attraction opened in 2007. There are several large aviaries for birds of prey including bald eagle, Steller's sea eagle, African fish eagle, Andean condor, kites, secretary bird, eagle-owl, and many types of caracaras and vultures. This part also features an enclosure for capybara, giant anteaters and lowland tapirs.

=== Tropicalia ===
A subtropical greenhouse, consisting of a Tropical Rainforest part and a desert part. In addition to enclosures for cottontop tamarin, toco toucan and Aldabra giant tortoises, it also has many free-ranging birds, including Cape thick-knee, lilac-breasted roller, African jacana, sunbittern and brown-hooded kingfisher.

== Gardens ==
=== Rose garden ===
Established in 2004, this rose garden is home to more than 700 varieties of roses from around the world, including rose bushes, climbing roses, vines, and rambling roses.

=== Andalusian garden ===
This garden near the park entrance is inspired by Moorish patios and the palaces of Spain. In addition to plants including ferns, fig trees, persimmons, and albizia, this garden includes many ponds and fountains.

=== Olive garden ===
The collection of plants in this garden was originally part of the Ghent Flower Show. The garden includes olive plants, fig trees, a cork oak, and a large patch of lavender which attracts butterflies.

== Other attractions ==
A narrow gauge passenger train using historic steam locomotives circles a large part of the zoo. For a separate fee it gives visitors a view of many enclosures and animals including Asian elephants, hippopotamuses and American bison.

== Gallery ==
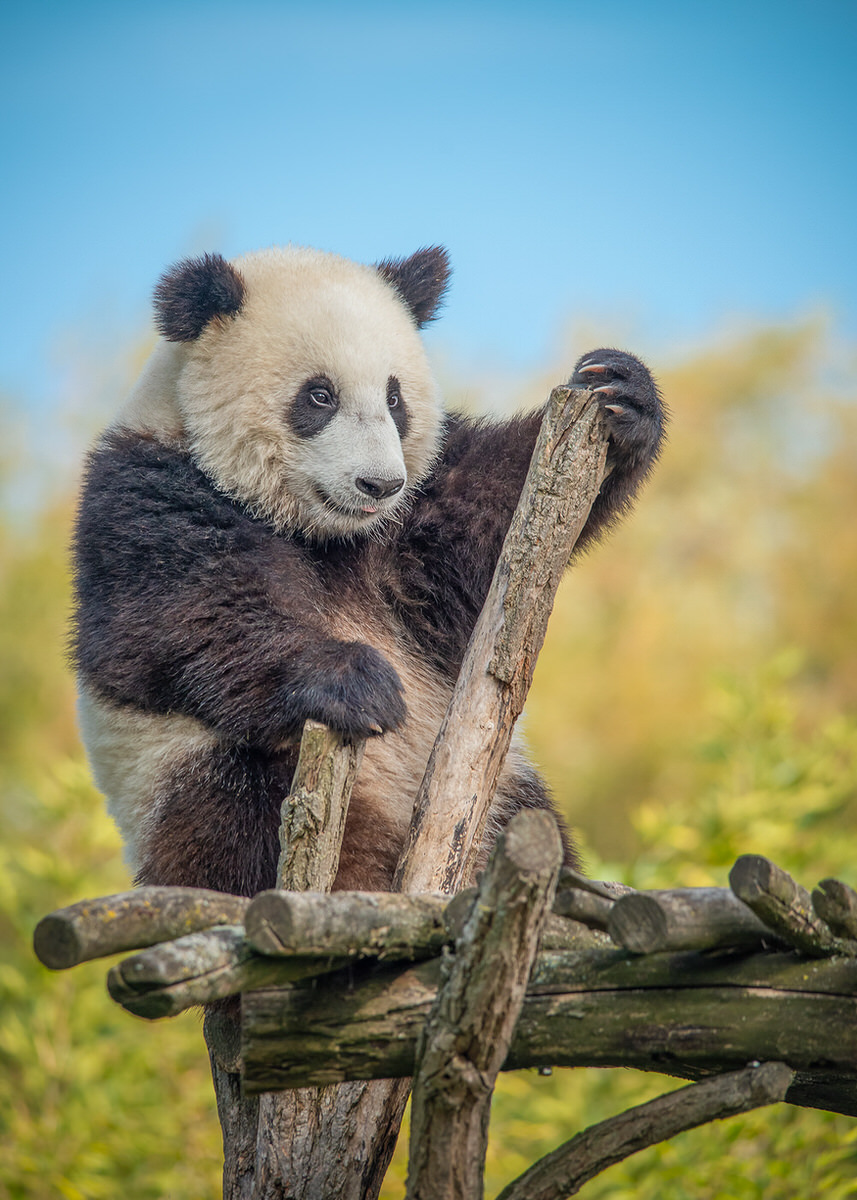
Little giant panda

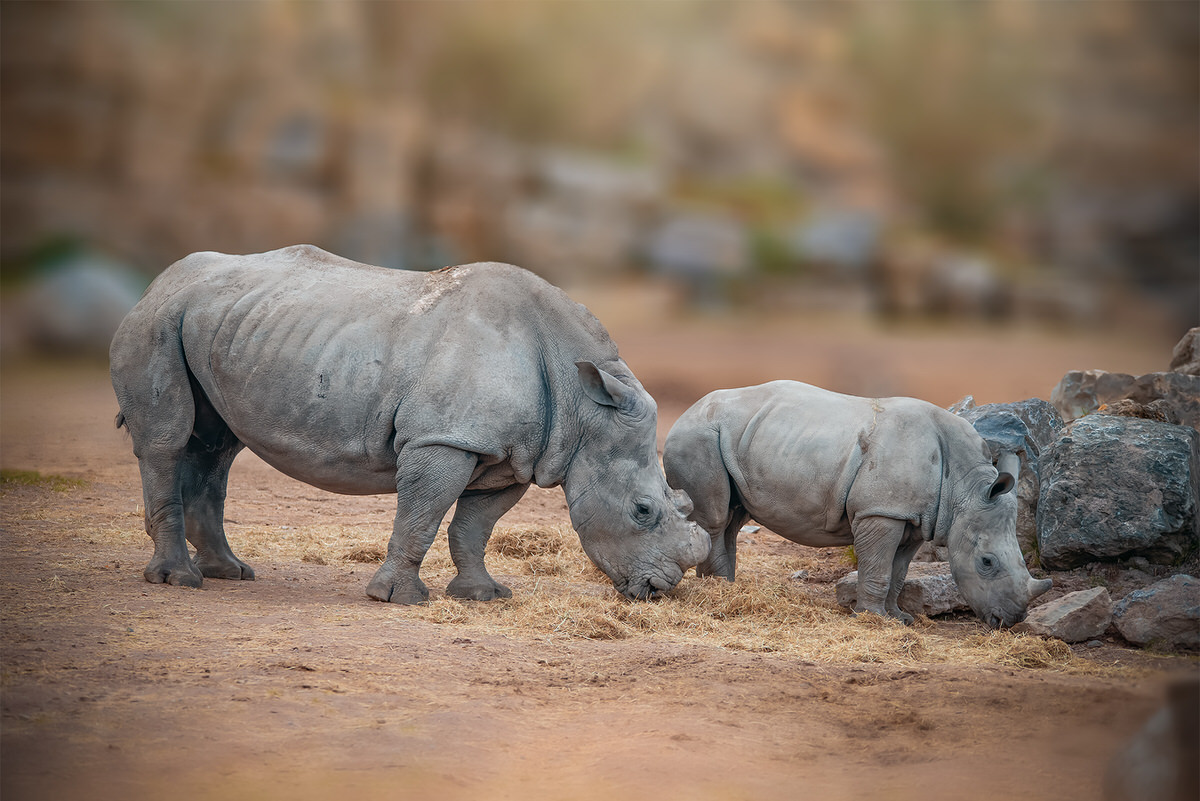
Rhinoceros with calf

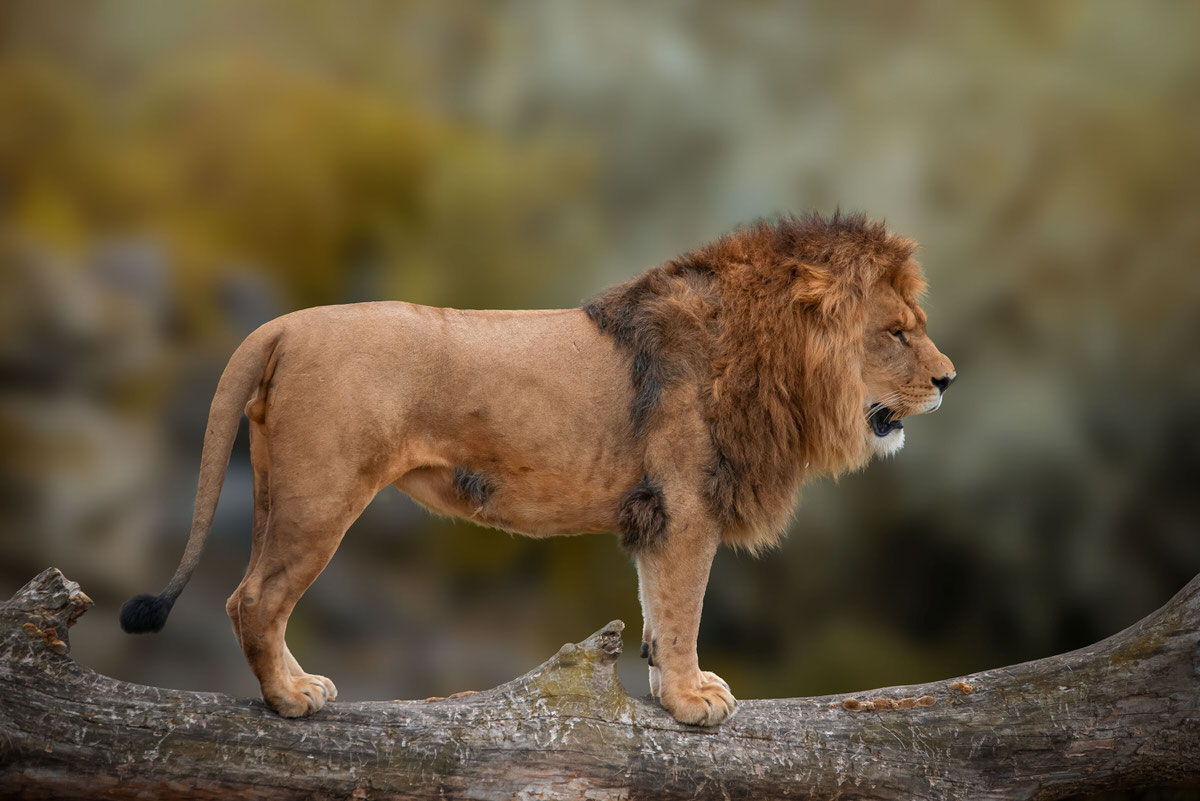
Lion

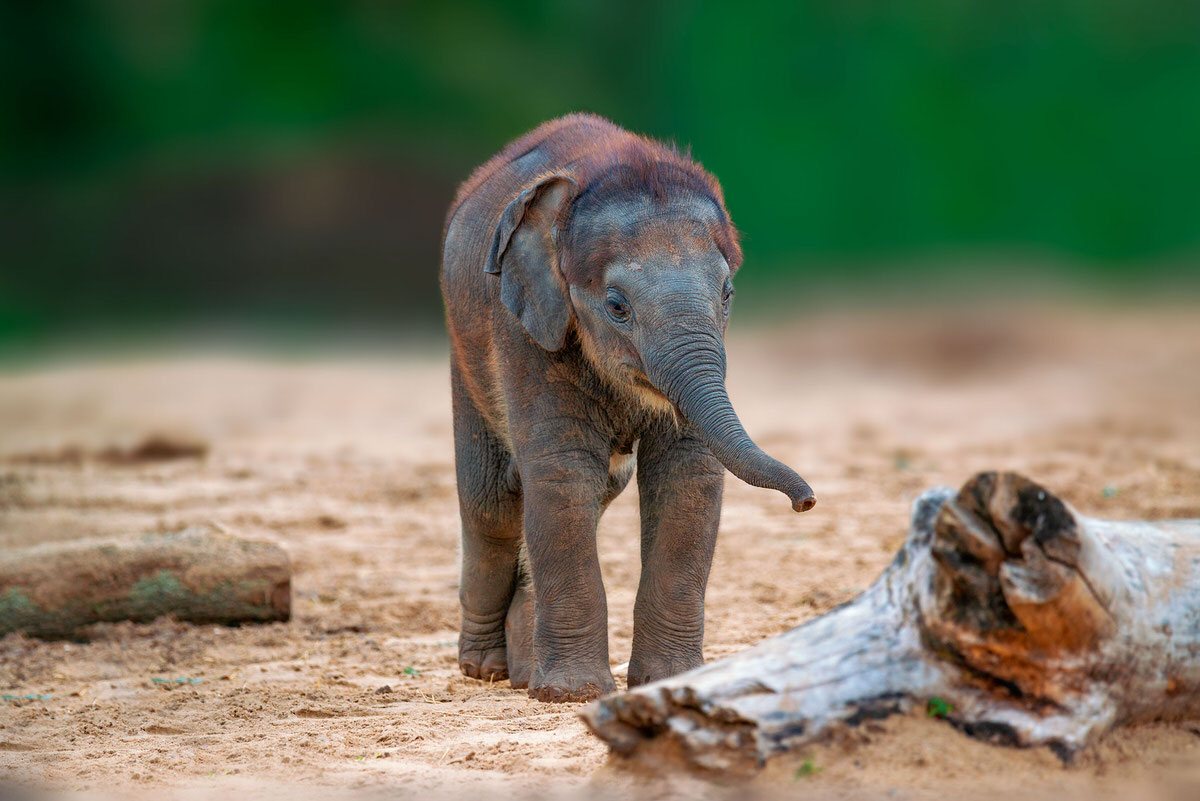
Playful baby elephant

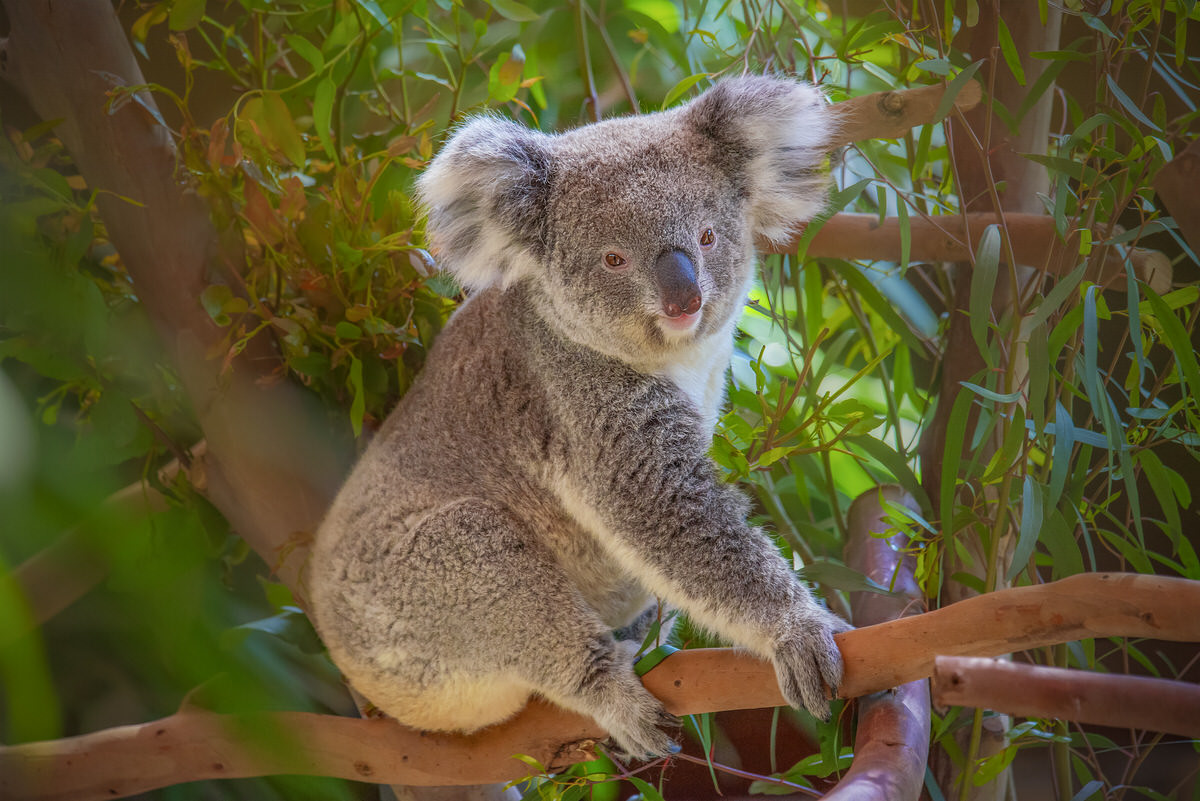
Koala

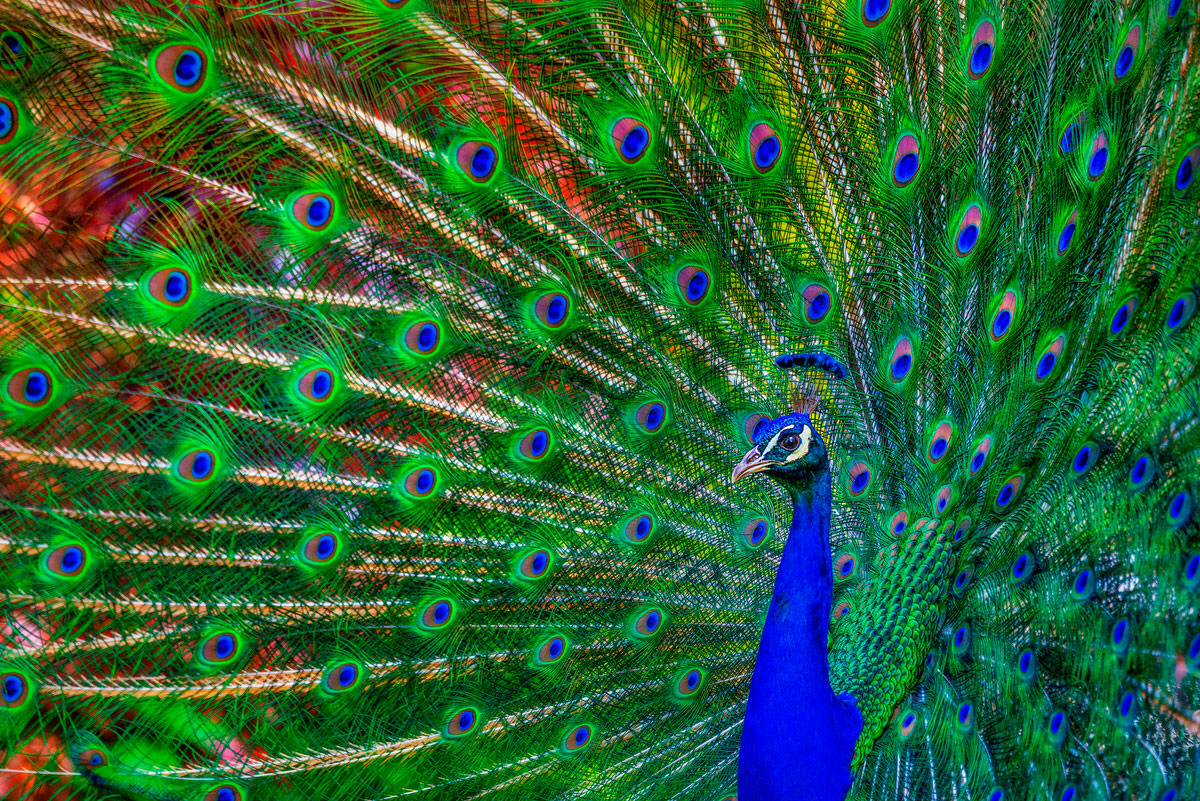
Peacock

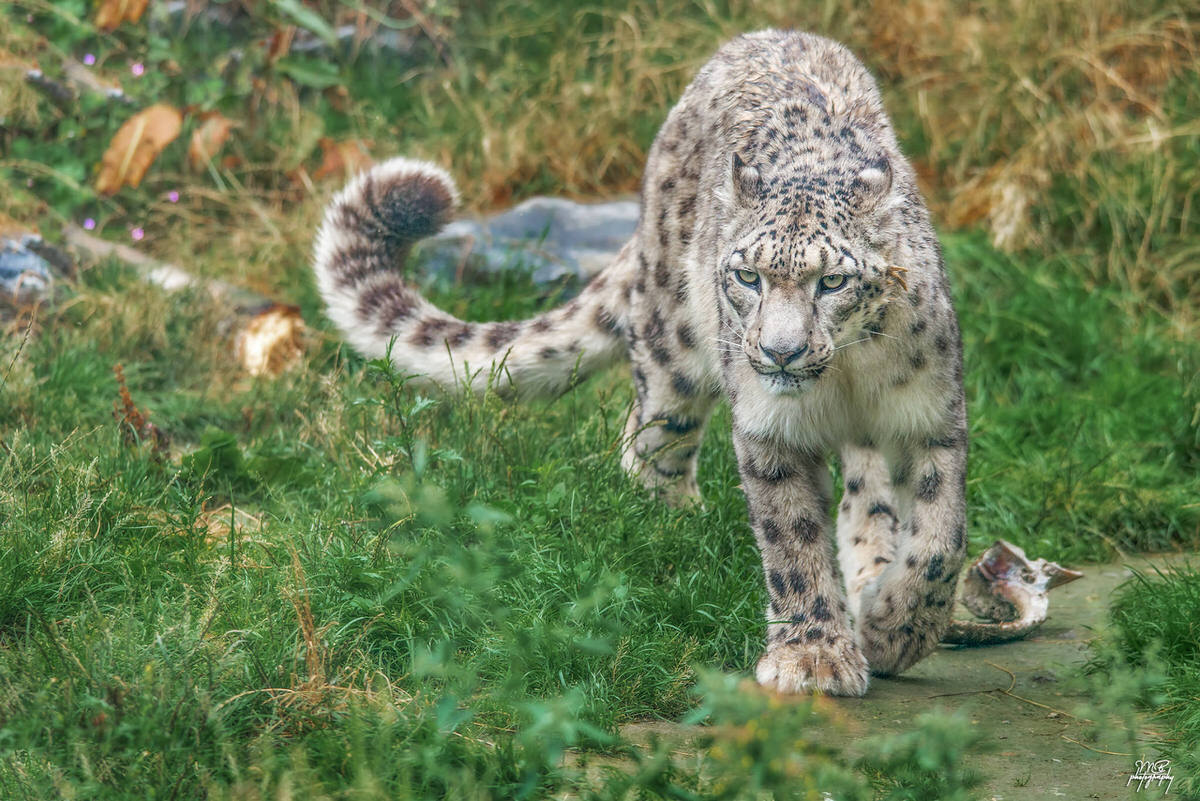
Snow leopard

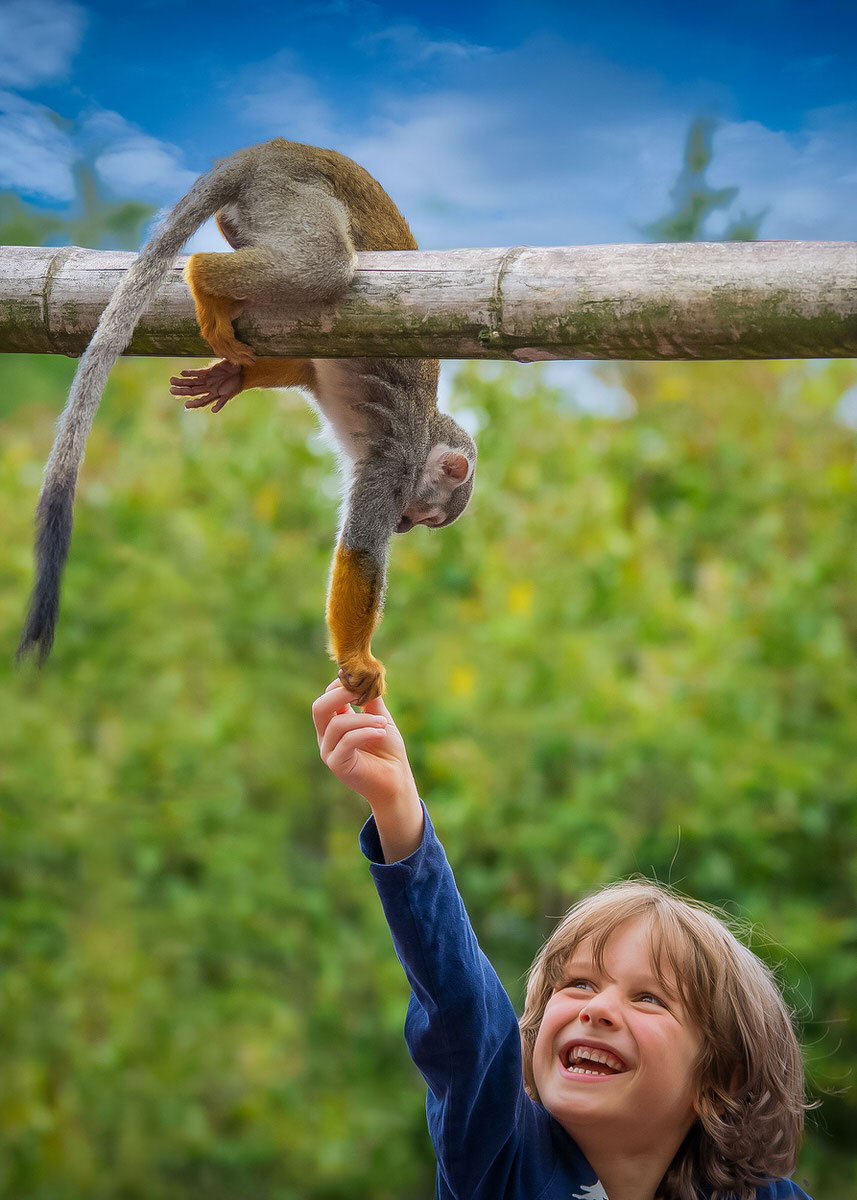
Happy little boy with a squirrel monkey
