= Stoppeldijk =

- Former village
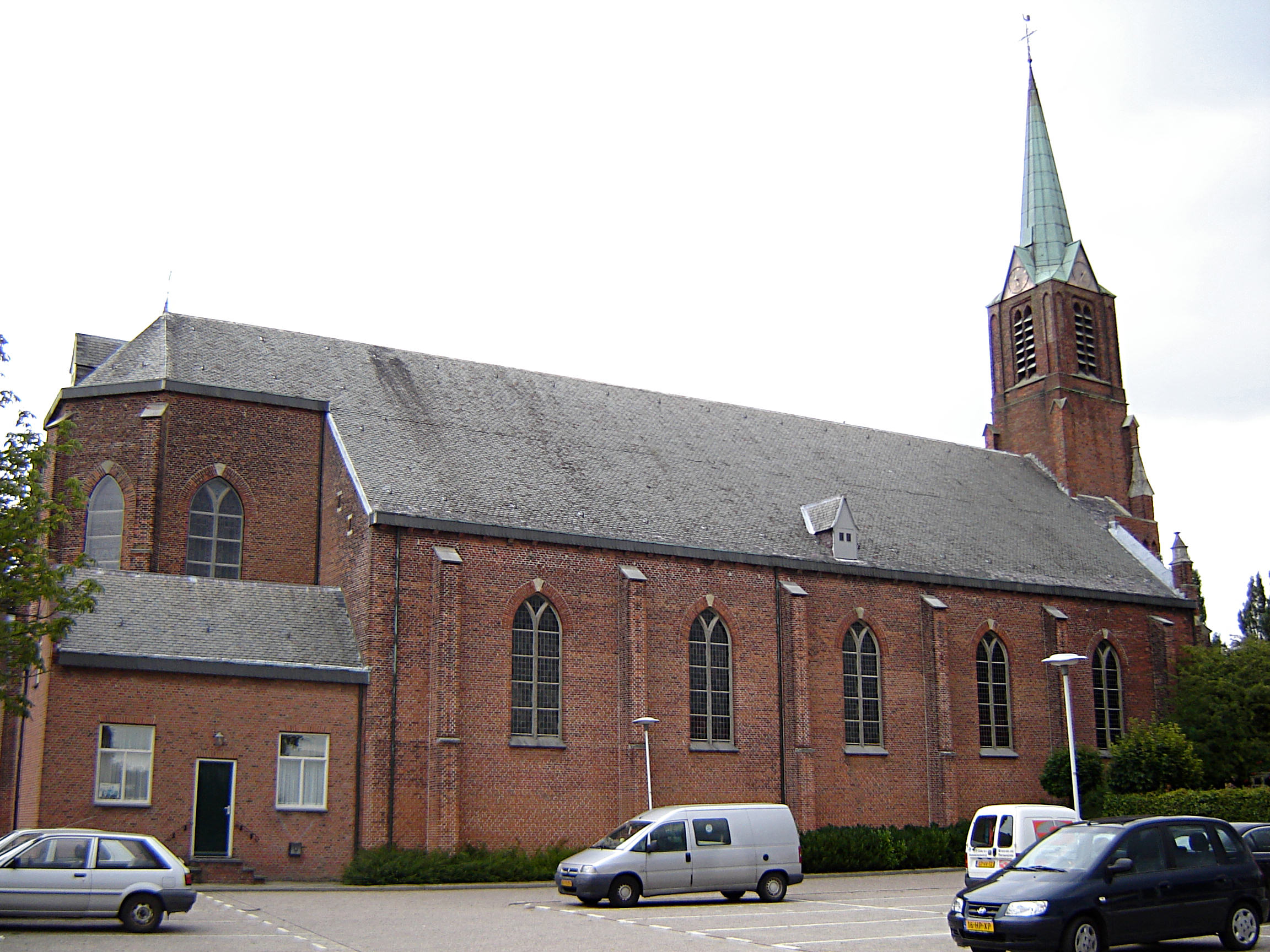
- Saint Gerulphus church

- Coat of arms

- Location in the province of Zeeland in the Netherlands Stoppeldijk (Netherlands)
- Coordinates: 51°19.32′N 3°59′E
- Country: Netherlands
- Province: Zeeland
- Municipality: Hulst

Area
  - Total: 0.44 km^{2} (0.17 sq mi)
- Elevation: 1.6 m (5.2 ft)

Population (2021)
  - Total: 655
  - Density: 1,500/km^{2} (3,900/sq mi)
- Time zone: UTC+1 (CET)
  - Summer (DST): UTC+2 (CEST)
- Postal code: 4581
- Dialing code: 0114

Stoppeldijk is a former village in the Dutch province of Zeeland. Since 1970, it has been part of the village of Vogelwaarde.

Stoppeldijk was a separate municipality until 1936, when it was merged with Boschkapelle.
