= Brugelette =

Municipality in Hainaut Province, Wallonia, Belgium

Brugelette Brujlete (Picard)
- Municipality
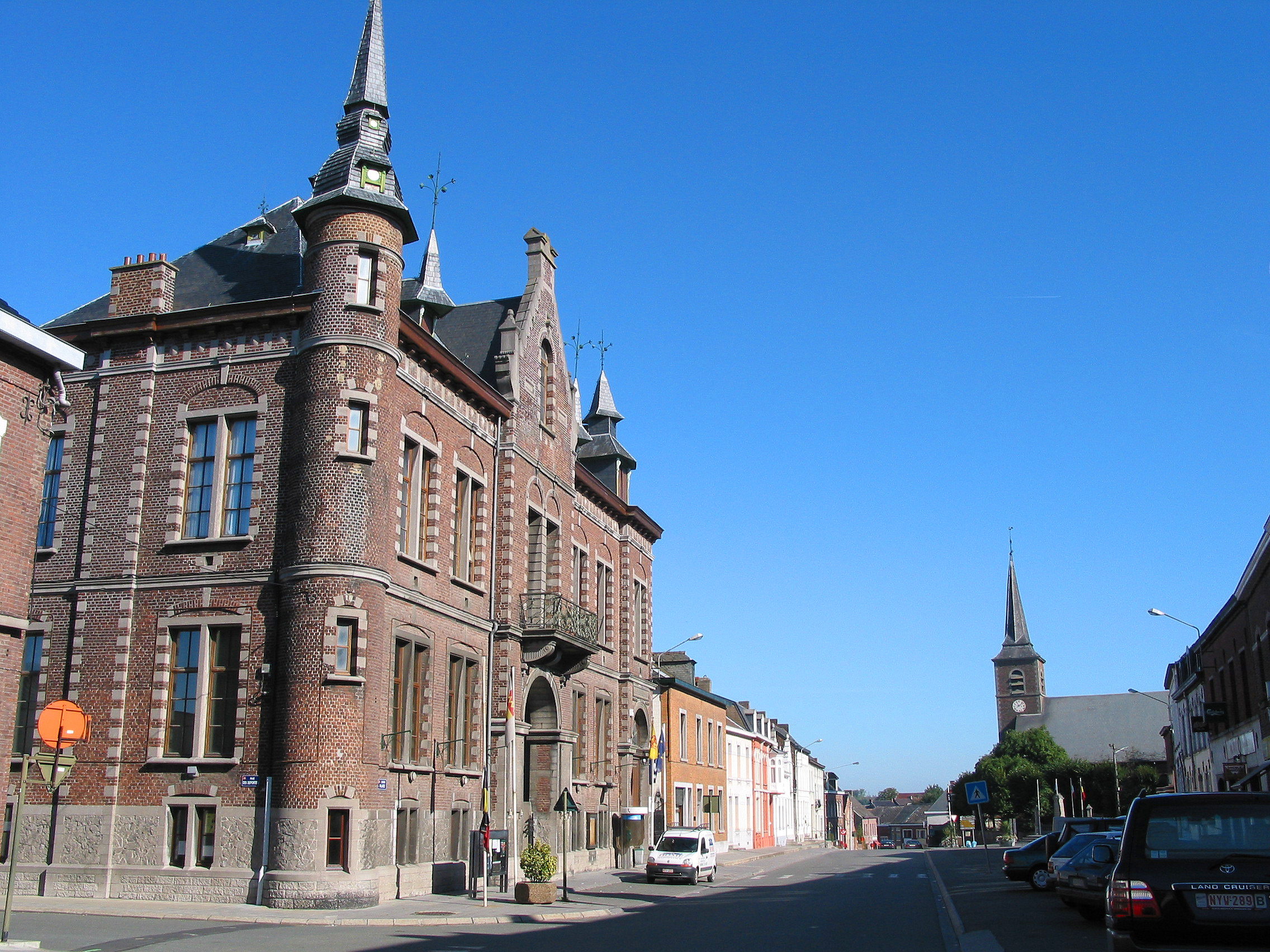

- Flag Coat of arms

- Location of Brugelette in Hainaut
- Interactive map of Brugelette
- Location in Belgium
- Coordinates: 50°36′N 03°51′E
- Country: Belgium
- Community: French Community
- Region: Wallonia
- Province: Hainaut
- Arrondissement: Ath

Government
  - Mayor: André Desmarlières (Liste du Mayeur)
  - Governing party: Liste du Mayeur

Area
  - Total: 28.59 km^{2} (11.04 sq mi)

Population (2018-01-01)
  - Total: 3,658
  - Density: 127.9/km^{2} (331.4/sq mi)
- Postal codes: 7940-7943
- NIS code: 51012
- Area codes: 068
- Website: www.brugelette.be

Brugelette (French pronunciation: [bʁyʒlɛt]; Picard: Brujlete; Walloon: Brudjlete) is a municipality of Wallonia located in the province of Hainaut, Belgium.

On January 1, 2006, Brugelette had a total population of 3,284. The total area is 28.40 km^{2} (10.97 sq mi) which gives a population density of 116 inhabitants per square kilometre (300/sq mi).

The municipality consists of the following districts: Attre, Brugelette, Cambron-Casteau, Gages, and Mévergnies-lez-Lens.

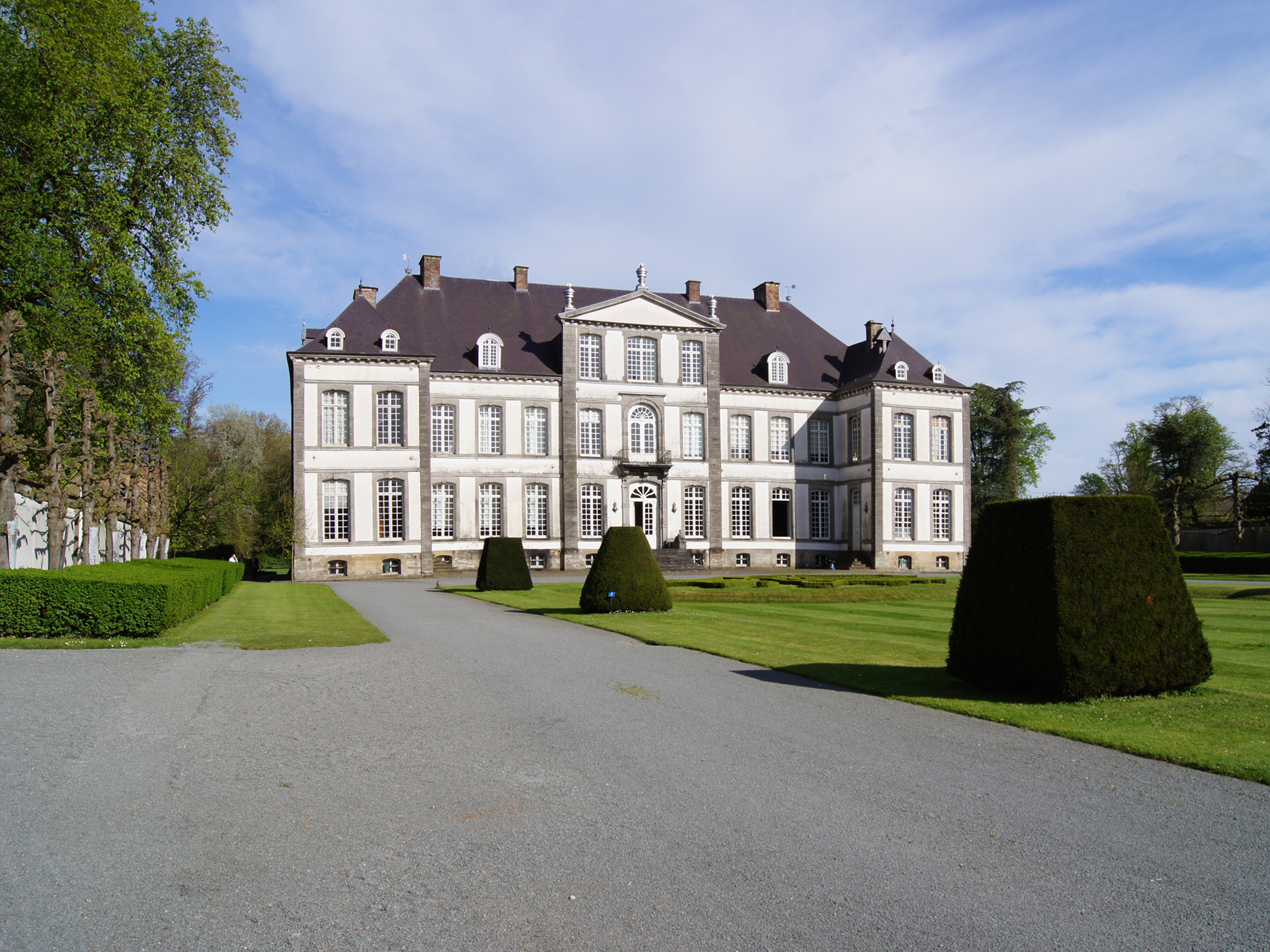
Attre castle

== See also ==
- Attre Castle
- Pairi Daiza (zoo and botanical garden)
