= Attre Castle =

Castle

Coordinates: 50.608°N 3.842°E

- Wallonia, Belgium
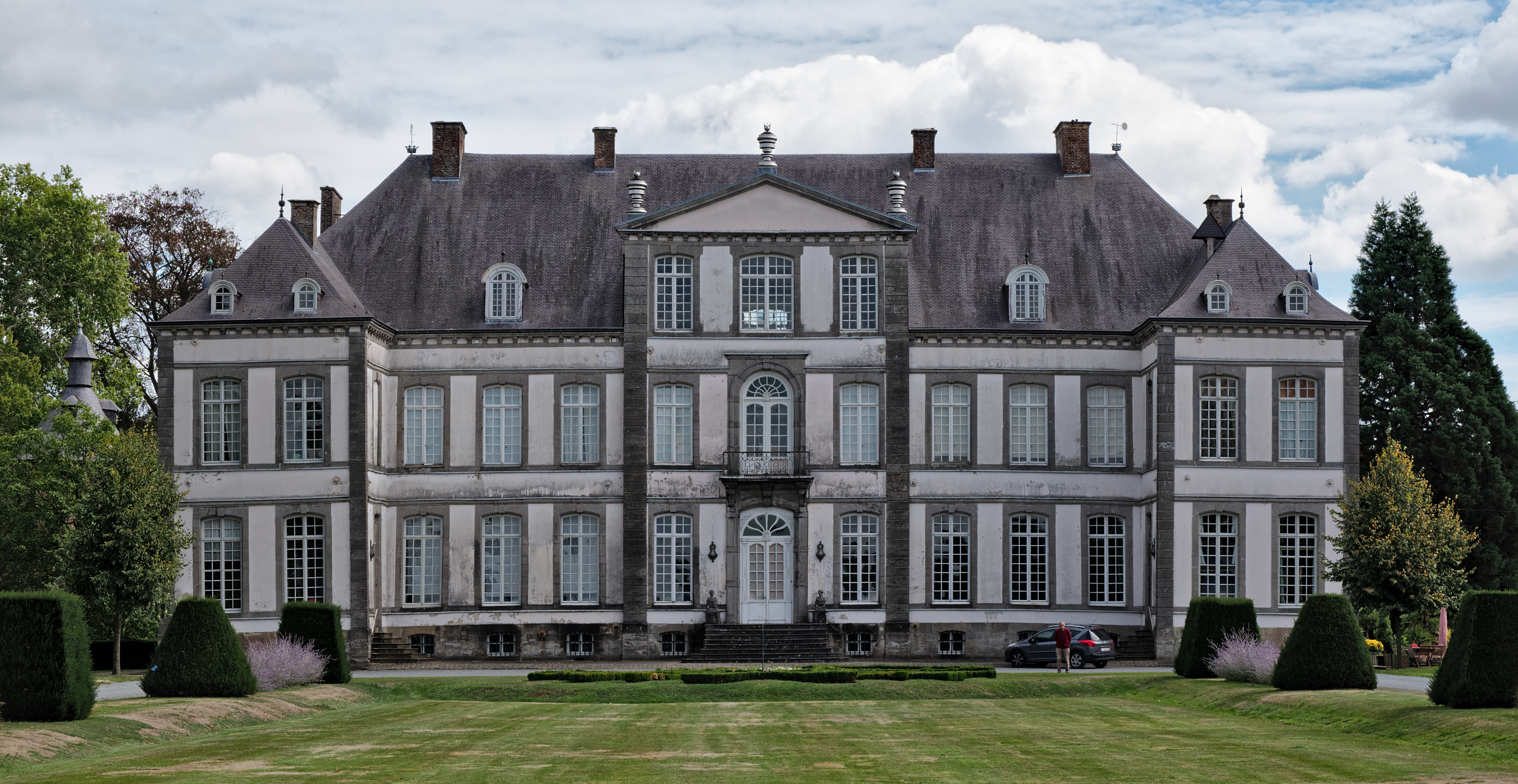

Site information
- Type: Castle

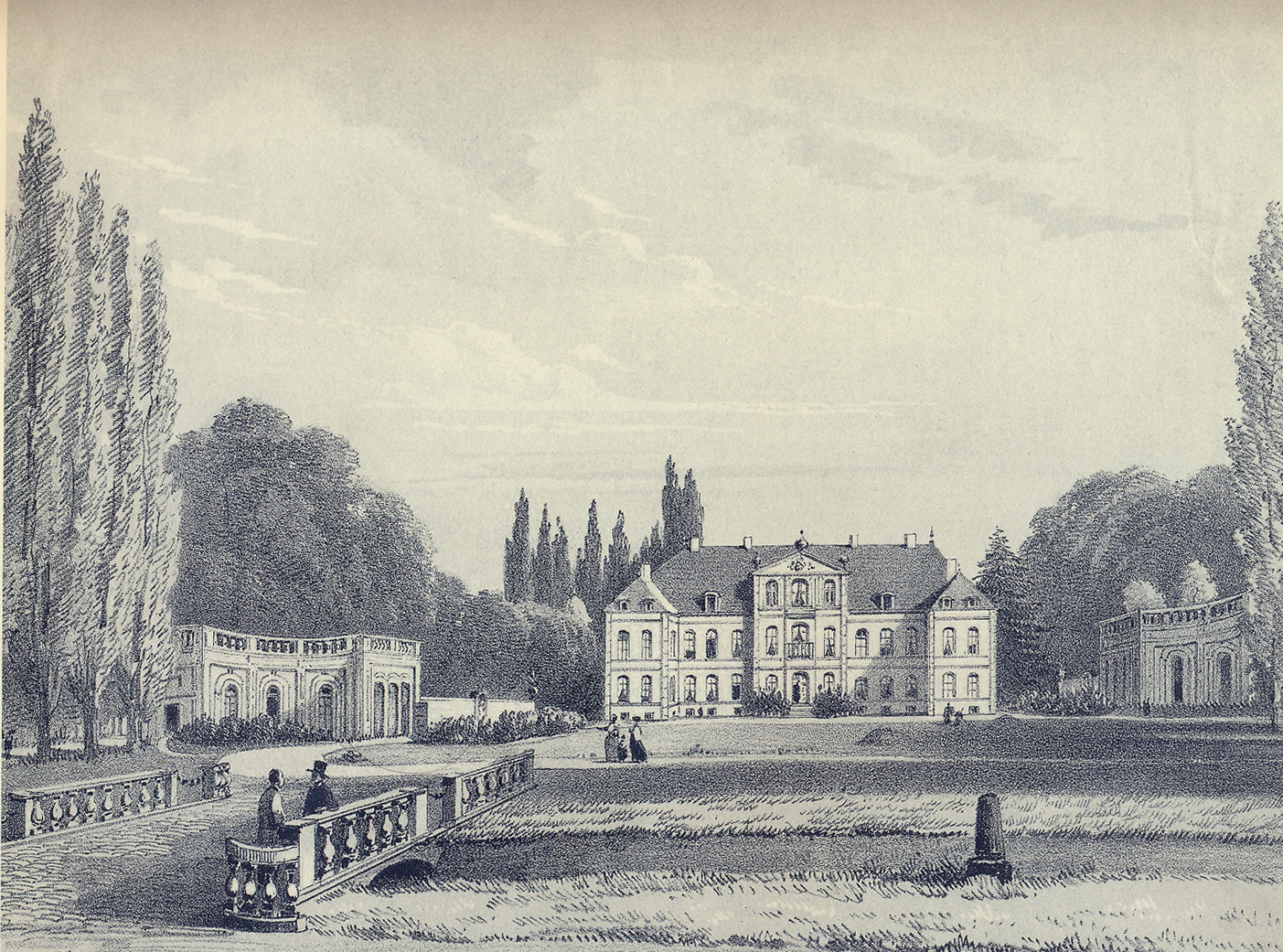
Château d'Attre (19th-century engraving)

Attre Castle (Château d'Attre) is a former castle, now a country house or château, in Attre in the municipality of Brugelette, province of Hainaut, Wallonia, Belgium.

== History ==
The present château at Attre was built in the middle of the 18th century by Count François Philippe Franeau d’Hyon van Gomegnies, on the foundations of a medieval castle that had been in the hands of the family since 1520. The structural work was finished in 1752, and Count François died shortly after in 1755. His son François Ferdinand Franeau d’Hyon continued the work of his father and saw to it that the interior decorations were finished. It took more than 30 years before the interior was completely decorated.

The present building is in a Neo-Classical style and the interiors are French, mainly Louis Quinze.

In addition to the landscaped garden and the forest park, it is home to several melancholic "follies", such as the Belvédère tower ruins, the 15th century dovecote, the hermitage, the Vignou tower, the Swiss chalet, the bath pavilion, "le Rocher", an artificial cave.

== See also ==
- List of castles in Belgium

== Sources ==
- Belgian Castles: Attre
- park of Attre Castle Belgian Tourist office Wallonia Brussels
