= 2010 in archosaur paleontology =

The year 2010 in archosaur paleontology was eventful. Archosaurs include the only living dinosaur group — birds — and the reptile crocodilians, plus all extinct dinosaurs, extinct crocodilian relatives, and pterosaurs. Archosaur palaeontology is the scientific study of those animals, especially as they existed before the Holocene Epoch began about 11,700 years ago. The year 2010 in paleontology included various significant developments regarding archosaurs.

This article records new taxa of fossil archosaurs of every kind that have been described during the year 2010, as well as other significant discoveries and events related to paleontology of archosaurs that occurred in the year 2010.

== Newly named crurotarsans ==
Name	Status	Authors	Age	Unit	Location	Notes	Images
Baurusuchus albertoi	Valid	Nascimento; Zaher	Turonian/Santonian	Adamantina Formation	Brazil		
Crocodylus anthropophagus	Valid	Brochu; Njau; et al. (Note: Brochu, Njau, Blumenschine, Densmore.)	Plio-Pleistocene		Tanzania	A horned crocodile that preyed on early hominids	
Cerrejonisuchus	Valid	Hastings; Bloch; et al. (Note: Hastings, Bloch, Cadena, Jaramillo.)	Paleocene	Cerrejón Formation	Colombia	A short-snouted dyrosaurid which had a generalist feeding strategy. It grew to lengths of about 7 feet.	
Diplocynodon elavericus	Valid	Martin	Late Eocene		France		
Eoneustes	Valid	Young; Brusatte; Ruta; de Andrade	Bathonian		France	A new genus for "Teleidosaurus" gaudryi (Collot, 1905). "Metriorhynchus" bathonicus (Mercier, 1933) is a second species of Eoneustes.	
Gracilineustes	Valid	Young; Brusatte; Ruta; de Andrade	Callovian/Kimmeridgian	Oxford Clay	France; England	A new genus for "Metriorhynchus" leedsi (Andrews, 1913). "Metriorhynchus" acutus (Lennier, 1887) is a second species of Gracilineustes.	
Krabisuchus	Valid	Martin; Lauprasert	Late Eocene		Thailand	An early alligatorine.	
Pakasuchus	Valid	O’Connor; Sertich; et al. (Note: O'Connor, Sertich, Stevens, Roberts, Gottfried, Hieronymus, Jinnah, Ridgely Ngasala, Temba)	Albian		Tanzania		
Pravusuchus	Valid	Stocker	Norian	Chinle Formation	USA	A phytosaur.	
Stagonolepis olenkae	Valid	Sulej	Late Carnian	Krasiejów deposits	Poland		
Theriosuchus sympiestodon	Valid	Martin; Rabi; Csiki	Maastrichtian	Haţeg Basin	Romania	Originally described as a species of Theriosuchus; Tennant, Mannion & Upchurch (2016) transferred it to the genus Sabresuchus.	
Torvoneustes	Valid	Andrade; Young; et al. (Note: Andrade, Young, Desojo, Brusatte)	Kimmeridgian	Kimmeridge Clay	UK	A new genus for "Dakosaurus" carpenteri (Wilkinson et al., 2008)	
Tsoabichi	Valid	Brochu	Eocene (Wasatchian)	Green River Formation	USA	An early caiman.	

== Newly named basal dinosauriforms ==
Name	Status	Authors	Age	Unit	Location	Notes	Images
Asilisaurus	Valid	Nesbitt; Sidor; et al. (Note: Nesbitt, Sidor, Irmis, Angielczyk, Smith, Tsuji.)	Anisian	Manda Beds	Tanzania	A silesaurid, and the oldest known ornithodire.	

== Newly named non-avian dinosaurs ==
- A new family of allosauroid theropods, Neovenatoridae, is published by Benson, Carrano, and Brusatte.
- A new family of tyrannosauroid theropods, Proceratosauridae is published by Rauhut, Milner and Moore-Fay.

62 new genera and additional 2 new species have been described in 2010.

Name	Status	Authors	Discovery year	Age	Unit	Location	Notes	Images
Aardonyx	Valid	Yates; Bonnan; et al. (Note: Yates, Bonnan, Neveling, Chinsamy, and Blackbeard.)		Hettangian	Elliot Formation	South Africa	A facultively quadrupedal prosauropod which displays transitional characters connecting more primitive obligate bipedal forms with the more derived obligative quadrupedal sauropodomorphs.	
Abydosaurus	Valid	Chure; Britt; et al. (Note: Chure, Britt, Whitlock, Wilson.)		Albian	Cedar Mountain Formation	USA	A narrow toothed brachiosaurid whose remains include the first known cranial material of any Cretaceous sauropod from the Americas.	
Ajkaceratops	Valid	Ösi; Butler; Weishampel		Santonian	Csehbánya Formation	Hungary	A coronosaurian ceratopsian.	
Archaeoceratops yujingziensis	Valid	You; Tanque; Dodson		?Aptian–Albian	Xinminpu Group	China	A second species of Archaeoceratops.	
Arkharavia	Nomen Dubium	Alifanov; Bolotsky		Maastrichtian	Udurchukan Formation	Russia	A Somphospondylan Sauropod known only from a single weakly heterocoelous tail vertebrae. Heterocoelous vertebrae are those where the centrum or body of a vertebra has saddle-shaped surface where it meets the vertebrae both in front and behind it.	
Atsinganosaurus	Valid	Garcia; Amico; et al. (Note: Garcia, Amico, Fournier, Thouand, Valentin.)		Late Cretaceous	Grès à Reptiles Formation	France	A titanosaur	
Austrocheirus	Valid	Ezcurra; Agnolin; Novas	2002	Maastrichtian	Pari Aike Formation	Argentina	A basal abelisauroid	
Banji	Valid	Xu; Han		Maastrichtian	Nanxiong Formation	China	An oviraptorid known from a skull with a striated crest.	
Barilium	Valid	Norman		Early Valanginian	Wealden Group	England	A new genus for "Iguanodon" dawsoni (Lydekker, 1888).	
Beishanlong	Valid	Makovicky; Li; et al. (Note: Makovicky, Li, Gao, Lewin, Erickson, Norell.)		Aptian-Albian	Xinminpu Group	China	A giant ornithomimosaur.	
Bistahieversor	Valid	Carr; Williamson		Campanian	Kirtland Formation	USA	A 30-foot tyrannosauroid known from the remains of both adults and juveniles. Previously considered a species of Daspletosaurus.	
Blasisaurus	Valid	Cruzado-Caballero; Pereda-Suberbiola; Ruiz-Omeñaca		Late Maastrichtian	Arén Formation	Spain	A lambeosaurine hadrosaurid	
Bolong	Valid	Wu; Godefroit; Hu		Early Cretaceous	Yixian Formation	China	An iguanodontoid	
Chromogisaurus	Valid	Ezcurra		Late Triassic	Ischigualasto Formation	Argentina	A guaibasaurid sauropodomorph	
Chuxiongosaurus	Valid	Lü; Kobayashi; et al. (Note: Lü, Kobayashi, Li, Zhong.)		Early Jurassic	Lower Lufeng Formation	China	A prosauropod.	
Coahuilaceratops	Valid	Loewen; Sampson; et al. (Note: Loewen, Sampson, Lund, Farke, Aguillón-Martínez, de Leon, Rodríguez-de la Rosa, Getty, Eberth.)		Early Maastrichtian	Cerro Huerta Formation	Mexico	A chasmosaurine ceratopsid with the largest horns of any dinosaur currently known.	
Concavenator	Valid	Ortega; Escaso; Sanz		Barremian	Calizas de La Huérguina Formation	Spain	A carcharodontosaurid with a pointed, hump-like crest near the hips and bumps on the ulnae that may be quill knobs.	
Cruxicheiros	Valid	Benson; Radley	early 1960s	Lower Bathonian	Chipping Norton Formation	UK	A large basal tetanuran known from scant remains.	
Diabloceratops	Valid	Kirkland; DeBlieux		Middle Campanian	Wahweap Formation	USA	A centrosaurine ceratopsid.	
Duriatitan	Valid	Barrett; Benson; Upchurch		Late Jurassic	Kimmeridge Clay Formation	UK	A titanosauriform sauropod	
Fruitadens	Valid	Butler; Galton; et al. (Note: Butler, Galton, Porro, Chiappe, Henderson, Erickson.)	late 1970s	Lower Tithonian	Morrison Formation	USA	A heterodontosaurid and the smallest known ornithischian dinosaur.	
Fukuititan	Valid	Azuma; Shibata		Barremian	Kitadani Formation	Japan	A titanosauriform sauropod.	
Geminiraptor	Valid	Senter; Kirkland; et al. (Note: Senter, Kirkland, Bird, Bartlett)		?lower Barremian	Cedar Mountain Formation	USA	A troodontid.	
Glishades	Valid	Prieto-Márquez		Campanian	Two Medicine Formation	USA	A basal hadrosauroid	
Haplocheirus	Valid	Choiniere; Xu; et al. (Note: Choiniere, Xu, Clark, Forster, Guo, Han.)	2004	Oxfordian	Shishugou Formation	China	The most primitive known alvarezsauroid.	
Hippodraco	Valid	McDonald; Kirkland; et al. (Note: Andrew T. McDonald, James I. Kirkland, Donald D. DeBlieux, Scott K. Madsen, Jennifer Cavin, Andrew R. C. Milner, Lukas Panzarin)		Upper Barremian-lowermost Aptian	Cedar Mountain Formation	USA	A basal iguanodontian	
Hypselospinus	Valid	Norman		Early Valanginian	Wealden Group	England	A new genus for "Iguanodon" fittoni (Lydekker, 1889).	
Ignavusaurus	Junior synonym of Massospondylus	Knoll		Hettangian	Elliot Formation	Lesotho	Originally interpreted as a distinct basal sauropodomorph, but now appears to be a misidentified juvenile Massospondylus specimen.	
Iguanacolossus	Valid	McDonald; Kirkland; et al.		?lower Barremian	Cedar Mountain Formation	USA	A basal iguanodontian	
Jeyawati	Valid	Mcdonald; Wolfe; Kirkland		Turonian	Moreno Hill Formation	USA	Basal hadrosauroid.	
Kayentavenator	Valid	Gay		Sinemurian/Pliensbachian	Kayenta Formation	USA	A basal tetanuran	
Kileskus	Valid	Averianov; Krasnolutskii; Ivantsov		Bathonian	Itat Formation	Russia	A tyrannosauroid	
Kosmoceratops	Valid	Sampson; Loewen; et al. (Note: Sampson, Loewen, Farke, Roberts, Forster, Smith, Titus.)		Late Campanian	Kaiparowits Formation	USA	A chasmosaurine ceratopsid.	
Kukufeldia	Valid	McDonald; Barrett; Chapman	1848	Barremian	Wealden Formation	UK	A basal iguanodont, formerly classified as Iguanodon anglicus	ñ
Linheraptor	Valid	Xu; Choinere; et al. (Note: Xu, Choinere, Pittman, Tan, Xiao, Li, Tan, Clark, Norell, Hone, Sullivan.)		Campanian	Bayan Mandahu Formation	China	A dromaeosaurid	
Liubangosaurus	Valid	Mo; Xu; Buffetaut		Early Cretaceous	Xinlong Formation	China	A eusauropod.	
Machairasaurus	Valid	Longrich; Currie; Dong		Late Cretaceous	Bayan Mandahu Formation	China	An ingeniine oviraptorid.	
Medusaceratops	Valid	Ryan; Russell; Hartman		Campanian	Judith River Formation	USA	A ceratopsid dinosaur. Initially considered to be a member of Chasmosaurinae, subsequently reinterpreted as a member of Centrosaurinae.	
Mojoceratops	Valid	Longrich		Late Campanian	Dinosaur Park Formation	Canada	A long-horned chasmosaurine ceratopsid.	
Ojoceratops	Valid	Sullivan; Lucas		Late Cretaceous	Ojo Alamo Formation	USA	A chasmosaurine ceratopsid.	
Paludititan	Valid	Csiki; Codrea; et al. (Note: Csiki, Codrea, Jipa-Murzea, Godefroit.)		Maastrichtian	Haţeg Basin	Romania	A titanosaur	
Panamericansaurus	Valid	Calvo; Porfiri		Campanian-Maastrichtian	Allen Formation	Argentina	An aeolosaurini titanosaur	
Pneumatoraptor	Valid	Ősi; Apesteguía; Kowalewski		Santonian	Csehbánya Formation	Hungary	A small bird-like paravian estimated to reach slightly more than two feet in length.	
Proplanicoxa	Valid	Carpenter; Ishida		Late Barremian	Wessex Formation	England	A basal iguanodont	
Psittacosaurus gobiensis	Valid	Sereno; Zhao; Tan		Lower Cretaceous	Bayan Gobi Formation	China	A ninth or eleventh species of Psittacosaurus.	
Rahiolisaurus	Valid	Novas; Chatterjee; et al. (Note: Novas, Chatterjee, Rudra, Datta.)		Maastrichtian	Lameta Formation	India	An abelisaurid	
Rubeosaurus	Valid	McDonald; Horner		Campanian	Two Medicine Formation	USA	A new genus for "Styracosaurus" ovatus Gilmore, 1930.	
Sanjuansaurus	Valid	Alcober; Martinez		Late Carnian	Ischigualasto Formation	Argentina	A herrerasaurid	
Seitaad	Valid	Sertich; Loewen	2005	Pleinsbachian	Navajo Sandstone	USA	A basal sauropodomorph	
Sellacoxa	Valid	Carpenter; Ishida		Early Valanginian	Wealden Group	England	A basal iguanodont	
Sinoceratops	Valid	Xu; Wang; et al. (Note: Xu, Wang, Zhao, Li.)		Upper Cretaceous	Wangshi Group	China	A basal centrosaurine.	
Tatankaceratops	Valid	Ott; Larson		Maastrichtian	Hell Creek Formation	USA	A chasmosaurine ceratopsid.	
Texacephale	Valid	Longrich; Sankey; Tanke		Upper Campanian	Aguja Formation	USA	A basal pachycephalosaur.	
Tianyuraptor	Valid	Zheng; Xu; et al. (Note: Zheng, Xu, You, Zhao, Dong.)		Early Cretaceous	Yixian Formation	China	A short-armed dromaeosaurid.	
Tonganosaurus	Valid	Li; Yang; et al. (Note: Li, Yang, Liu, Wang.)		Early Jurassic	Yimen Formation	China	A mamenchisaurid sauropod.	
Torilion	Junior synonym	Carpenter; Ishida		Mid Valanginian	Wadhurst Clay	England	Junior synonym of Barilium	
Utahceratops	Valid	Sampson; Loewen; et al.		Late Campanian	Kaiparowits Formation	USA	A chasmosaurine ceratopsid.	
Vagaceratops	Valid	Sampson; Loewen; et al.		Late Campanian	Dinosaur Park Formation	Canada	A chasmosaurine ceratopsid. A new genus for "Chasmosaurus" irvinensis Holmes et al., 2001.	
Wadhurstia	Junior synonym	Carpenter; Ishida		Early Valanginian	Wadhurst Clay	England	Junior synonym of Hypselospinus	
Willinakaqe	Valid	Juárez Valieri; Haro; et al. (Note: Juárez Valieri, Haro, Fiorelli, Calvo.)		late Campanian-early Maastrichtian	Allen Formation	Argentina	Second hadrosauroid from South America.	
Xiongguanlong	Valid	Li; Norell; et al. (Note: Li, Norell, Gao, Smith, Makovicky.)		Aptian–Albian	Xinminpu Group	China	A longirostrine tyrannosauroid.	
Xixianykus	Valid	Xu; Wang; et al. (Note: Xu, Wang, Sullivan, Hone, Han, Yan, Du.)		Campanian	Majiacun Formation	China	A parvicursorine.	
Xixiasaurus	Valid	Lü; Xu; et al. (Note: Lü, Xu, Liu, Zhang, Jia, Ji.)		Campanian	Majiacun Formation	China	A troodontid.	
Xixiposaurus	Valid	Sekiya		Lower Jurassic	Lower Lufeng Formation	China	A prosauropod.	
Zhuchengceratops	Valid	Xu; Wang; et al. (Note: Xu, Wang, Zhao, Sullivan, Chen.)		Upper Cretaceous	Wangshi Group	China	A leptoceratopsid.	
Zuolong	Valid	Choiniere; Clark; et al. (Note: Choiniere, Clark, Forster, Xu.)		Oxfordian	Shishugou Formation	China	Basal coelurosaur	

== Newly named birds ==
Name	Status	Novelty	Authors	Age	Unit	Location	Notes	Images
Agapornis atlanticus	Valid	Sp. nov.	Cécile Mourer-Chauviré Denis Geraads	Late Pliocene	Ahl al Oughlam	Morocco	A Psittacidae, a lovebird.	
Ankonetta larriestrai	Valid	Gen. nov. et Sp. nov.	Marcos M. Cenizo Federico L. Agnolín	Early or Middle Miocene	Santa Cruz Formation	Argentina	A basal member of Anatidae. This is type species of the new genus.	
Aquila bullockensis	Valid	Sp. nov.	Priscilla Gaff Walter E. Boles	Middle Miocene	Bullock Creek	Australia: Northern Territory	An Accipitridae, the oldest Aquila species is in Australia.	
Balaur bondoc	Valid	Gen. nov. et Sp. nov.	Csiki Vremir et al. (Note: Csiki, Vremir, Brusatte, Norell.)	Late Cretaceous: Maastrichtian	Sebeş Formation	Romania	A four-toed, two-fingered avialian.	
Bauxitornis mindszentyae	Valid	Gen. nov. et Sp. nov.	Gareth J. Dyke Attila Ősi	Santonian	Csehbánya Formation	Hungary	An Enantiornithes Walker, 1981, Avisauridae Brett-Surman & Paul, 1985. This is the type species of the new genus.	
?Borvocarbo tardatus	Valid	Sp. nov.	Ursula B. Göhlich Cécile Mourer-Chauviré	Early Miocene	MN 4c	Germany: Bavaria	A Phalacrocoracoidea, Pelecaniformes, possibly a species of Borvocarbo.	
Camptodontus yangi	Valid	Gen. nov. et Sp. nov.	Li Li En-pu Gong Li-dong Zhang Ya-jun Yang Lian-hai Hou	Early Cretaceous	Aptian, Jiufotang Formation	China	An Enantiornithes Walker, 1981, Longipterygidae Zhang, Zhou, Hou et Gu, 2000, this is the type species of the new genus.	
Carduelis aurelioi	Valid	Sp. nov.	Carlos Rando Josep A. Alcover Juan C. Illera	Late Pleistocene to Holocene		Spain: Canary Islands	A Fringillidae, Carduelinae.	
Celericolius acriala	Valid	Gen. nov. et Sp. nov.	Daniel T. Ksepka Julia A. Clarke	Eocene		USA: Wyoming	A Coliidae, a species of Coliidae. This is the type species of the new genus.	
Confuciusornis jianchangensis	Disputed	Sp. nov.	Li Li Wang Jing-qi Hou Shi-lin	Aptian	Jiufotang Formation	China	A species of Confuciusornis known from a single skeleton. Considered to be a junior synonym of Confuciusornis sanctus by Wang, O'Connor & Zhou (2018).	
Corvus harkanyensis	Valid	Sp. nov.	Jenő Kessler	Late Pliocene	MN 15-16	Hungary	A new species of Corvus, Corvidae.	
Cuculus pannonicus	Valid	Sp. nov.	Jenö Kessler	Late Miocene; Late Pliocene	MN 13; MN 16	Hungary	A new species of Cuculus, Cuculidae.	
Cyrilavis	Valid	Gen. nov.	Larry D. Martin	Early Eocene	Green River Formation	USA: Wyoming; UK: England	A new genus with Primobucco olsoni Feduccia et Martin, 1976. as the type species.	
Dasornis abdoun	Valid	Sp. nov.	Estelle Bourdon	Early Eoceen	Ypresian	Morocco	An Odontopterygiformes. Dasornis Owen, 1870. The type species is Dasornis londinensis Owen, 1870.	
Eozygodactylus americanus	Valid	Gen. nov. et Sp. nov.	Ilka Weidig	Eocene Wasatchian	Green River Formation	USA: Wyoming	A Zygodactylidae Brodkorb, 1971, ?Piciformes, this is the type species of the new genus.	
Eurystomus beremedensis	Valid	Sp. nov.	Jenö Kessler	Late Pliocene	MN 16	Hungary	A new species of Eurystomus, Coraciidae.	
Flexomornis howei	Valid	Gen. nov. et Sp. nov.	Ronald S. Tykoski Anthony R. Fiorillo	Campanian	Woodbine Formation	USA: Texas	An Enantiornithes Walker, 1981. This is the type species of the new genus.	
Geronticus olsoni	Valid	Sp. nov.	Cécile Mourer-Chauviré Denis Geraads	Late Pliocene	Ahl al Oughlam	Morocco	A Threskiornithidae, a species of Geronticus.	
Glaucidium baranensis	Valid	Sp. nov.	Jenö Kessler	Late Pliocene	MN 15-16	Hungary	A new species of Glaucidium, Strigidae.	
Gyps bochenskii	Valid	Sp. nov.	Zlatozar N. Boev	Late Pliocene	MN 17	Bulgaria	A new species of Gyps, Accipitridae.	
Hollanda luceria	Valid	Gen. nov. et Sp. nov.	Alyssa K. Bell Luis M. Chiappe Gregory M. Erickson Shigeru Suzuki Mahito Watabe Rinchen Barsbold K. Tsogtbaatar	Campanian	Barun Goyot Formation	Mongolia	A predatory ground bird known from an unusual hind limb. This is the type species of the new genus.	
Huoshanornis huji	Valid	Gen. nov. et Sp. nov.	Wang Xia Zhang Zihui Gao Chunling Hou Lianhan Meng Qingjin Liu Jinyuan	Early Cretaceous	Jiufotang Formation	China	An Enantiornithes Walker, 1981. This is the type species of the new genus.	
Inkayacu paracasensis	Valid	Gen. nov. et Sp. nov.	Julia A. Clarke Daniel T. Ksepka Rodolfo Salas-Gismondi Ali J. Altamirano Matthew D. Shawkey Liliana D’Alba Jakob Vinther Thomas J. DeVries Patrice Baby	Late Eocene	Ica Region	Peru	A giant Spheniscidae and the type species of the new genus.	
Intiornis inexpectatus	Valid	Gen. nov. et Sp. nov.	Emilio Novas Federico L. Agnolín Carlos A. Scanferla	Campanian	Las Curtiembres Formation	Argentina	An Enantiornithes Walker, 1981, Avisauridae Brett-Surman et Paul, 1985, the type species of the new genus.	
Kuiornis indicator	Valid	Gen. nov. et Sp. nov.	Trevor H. Worthy Suzanne J. Hand Jacqueline M. T. Nguyen Alan J. D. Tennyson Jennifer P. Worthy R. Paul Scofield Walter E. Boles Michael Archer	Early Miocene	Altonian	New Zealand	A new genus and species of Acanthisittidae, it is the type species of the new genus.	
Lamarqueavis australis	Valid	Gen. nov. et Sp. nov.	Federico L. Agnolin	Late Cretaceous	Allen Formation, Campanian or Maastrichtian	Argentina	A Cimolopterygidae Brodkorb, 1963, this is the type species of the new genus.	
Lamarqueavis minima	Valid	Comb. nov.	Pierce Brodkorb	Late Cretaceous	Lance Formation	USA: Wyoming	A new genus for Cimolopteryx minima Brodkorb, 1963, transferred to Lamarqueavis by Agnolin, 2010.	
Lamarqueavis petra	Valid	Comb. nov.	Sylvia Hope	Late Cretaceous	Lance Formation	USA: Wyoming	A new genus for Cimolopteryx petra Hope, 2002, transferred to Lamarqueavis by Agnolin, 2010.	
Leptoptilos robustus	Valid	Sp. nov.	Hanneke J.M. Meijer Rokus Awe Due	Late Pleistocene	Liang Bua	Indonesia	A giant marabou stork, Ciconiidae.	
Longicrusavis houi	Valid	Gen. nov. et Sp. nov.	Jingmai K. O'Connor Gao Ke-Qin Luis M. Chiappe	Barremian	Yixian Formation	China	A Hongshanornithidae O’Connor, Gao et Chiappe, 2010, this is the type species of the new genus.	
Lophogallus naranbulakensis	Valid	Gen. nov. et Sp. nov.	Nikita V. Zelenkov Evgeny N. Kurochkin	Middle Miocene	Naran Bulak Formation	Mongolia	A Phasianidae, this is the type species of the new genus.	
Matuku otagoense	Valid	Gen. nov. et Sp. nov.	R. Paul Scofield Trevor H. Worthy Alan J. D. Tennyson	Early Miocene	Bannockburn Formation	New Zealand	An Ardeidae, the type species of the new genus.	
Mogontiacopsitta miocaena	Valid	Gen. nov. et Sp. nov.	Gerald Mayr	Late Oligocene / Early Miocene	Mainz Basin	Germany: Rhineland-Palatinate	A small Psittacidae, the type species of the new genus.	
Morsoravis sedilis	Valid	Gen. nov. et Sp. nov.	Sara Bertelli Bent E. K. Lindow Gareth J. Dyke Luis M. Chiappe	Early Eocene	Fur Formation	Denmark	The type species of the new genus. A bird of uncertain phylogenetic placement; it might be a relative of Charadriiformes or a relative of the passerines and the extinct family Zygodactylidae. Maybe close to Pumiliornis tessellatus G. Mayr, 1999.	
Oraristrix brea	Valid	Comb. nov.	Kenneth E. Campbell Jr. Zbigniew M. Bocheński	Late Pleistocene	La Brea Tar Pits	USA: California	Strigidae, a new genus for Strix brea Howard (1933), the type species of the new genus.	
Palaelodus aotearoa	Valid	Sp. nov.	Trevor H. Worthy Alan J. D. Tennyson Michael Archer R. Paul Scofield	Early Miocene	Bannockburn Formation	New Zealand	A Phoenicopteriformes, Palaelodidae Stejneger, 1885.	
Pelagornis chilensis	Valid	Sp. nov.	Gerald Mayr David Rubilar-Rogers	Miocene	Bahia Inglesa Formation	Chile	A Pelagornithidae Fürbringer, 1888 with a large wingspan.	
Perplexicervix microcephalon	Valid	Gen. nov. et Sp. nov.	Gerald Mayr	Middle Eocene	Messel pit, MP 11	Germany: Hessen	A member of Neognathae Incertae Sedis. The type species of the new genus.	
Plioperdix africana	Valid	Sp. nov.	Cécille Mourer-Chauviré Denis Geraads	Late Pliocene	Casablanca	Morocco	A Phasianidae, Galliformes, a species of Plioperdix Kretzoi, 1955.	
Presbyornis mongoliensis	Valid	Sp. nov.	Evgeney N. Kurochkin Gareth J. Dyke	Late Paleocene	Bumbam Member of the Narabulag Svita	Mongolia	A Presbyornithidae Wetmore, 1926, Anseriformes.	
Rhenanorallus rhenanus	Valid	Gerald Mayr	Gen. nov. et Sp. nov.	Late Oligocene / Early Miocene	MN 2a, Wiesbaden Formation, Mainz Basin	Germany: Rhineland-Palatinate	A small Rallidae, the type species of the new genus.	
Shenqiornis mengi	Valid	Gen. nov. et Sp. nov.	Wang Xuri Jingmai K. O'Connor Zhao Bo Luis M. Chiappe Gao Chunling Cheng Xiaodong	Aptian	Qiaotou Formation	China	An Enantiornithes Walker, 1981, this is the type species of the new genus.	
Shenshiornis primita	Valid	Gen. nov. et Sp. nov.	Hu Dongyu Li Li Hou Lianhai Xu Xing	Aptian	Jiufotang Formation	China	A Sapeornithidae Zhou, 2006, this is the type species of the new genus.	
Vastanavis cambayensis	Valid	Sp. nov.	Gerald Mayr Rajendra S. Rana Kenneth D. Rose Ashok Sahni Kishor Kumar Lachham Singh Thierry Smith	Early Eocene	Ypresian	India	A Vastanavidae G. Mayr, Rana, Rose, Sahni, Kumar, Sing et T. Smith, 2010, basal Psittaciformes.	
Zhongjianornis yangi	Valid	Gen. nov. et Sp. nov.	Zhou Zhonghe Zhang Fucheng Li Zhiheng	Aptian	Jiufotang Formation	China	A beaked basal avialan	

== Newly named pterosaurs ==
Name	Status	Authors	Age	Unit	Location	Notes	Images
Aetodactylus	Valid	Myers	Cenomanian	Tarrant Formation	United States	An ornithocheirid known only from a partial lower jaw.	
Alanqa	Valid	Ibrahim; Unwin; et al. (Note: Ibrahim, Unwin, Martill, Baidder, Zouhri.)	Late Cretaceous	Kem Kem Beds	Morocco	An azhdarchid known only from five fragments of the front upper and lower jaws, and possibly a neck vertebra.	
Archaeoistiodactylus	Valid	Lü; Fucha	Middle Jurassic	Tiaojishan Formation	China	An istiodactylid or a poorly preserved specimen of Darwinopterus.	
Darwinopterus	Valid	Lü; Unwin; et al. (Note: Lü, Unwin, Jin, Liu, Ji.)	Oxfordian	Tiaojishan Formation	China	A wukongopterid that was described as a derived rhamphorhynchoid with transitional characters connecting it with pterodactyloids.	
D. linglongtaensis	Valid	Wang; Kellner; et al. (Note: Wang, Kellner, Jiang, Cheng, Meng, Rodrigues.)	Late Jurassic	Daohugou Formation?	China	A second species of Darwinopterus	
Dawndraco	Disputed	Kellner	Late Coniacian/Early Santonian	Niobrara Formation	USA	A pteranodontid. The type species is Dawndraco kanzai. Martin-Silverstone et al. (2017) consider this species to be a junior synonym of Pteranodon sternbergi.	
Faxinalipterus	Valid	Bonaparte; Schultz; Soares	Late Triassic	Caturrita Formation	Brazil		
Fenghuangopterus	Valid	Lü; Fucha; Chen	Middle Jurassic	Tiaojishan Formation	China	An earliest scaphognathine pterosaur.	
Geosternbergia maiseyi	Valid	Kellner	Late Coniacian - Early Campanian	Sharon Springs Formation	USA	A pteranodontid.	
Kunpengopterus	Valid	Wang; Kellner; et al.	Late Jurassic	Daohugou Formation?	China	A wukongopterid. The type species is Kunpengopterus sinensis.	
Prejanopterus	Valid	Vidarte; Calvo	Lower Aptian	Leza Formation	Spain		
Sericipterus	Valid	Andres; Clark; Xing	Oxfordian	Shishugou Formation	China	A rhamphorhynchid with a nearly six foot wingspan.	
Zhenyuanopterus	Valid	Lü	Barremian	Yixian Formation	China	A boreopterid.	
