= Cécile Mourer-Chauviré =

French paleontologist

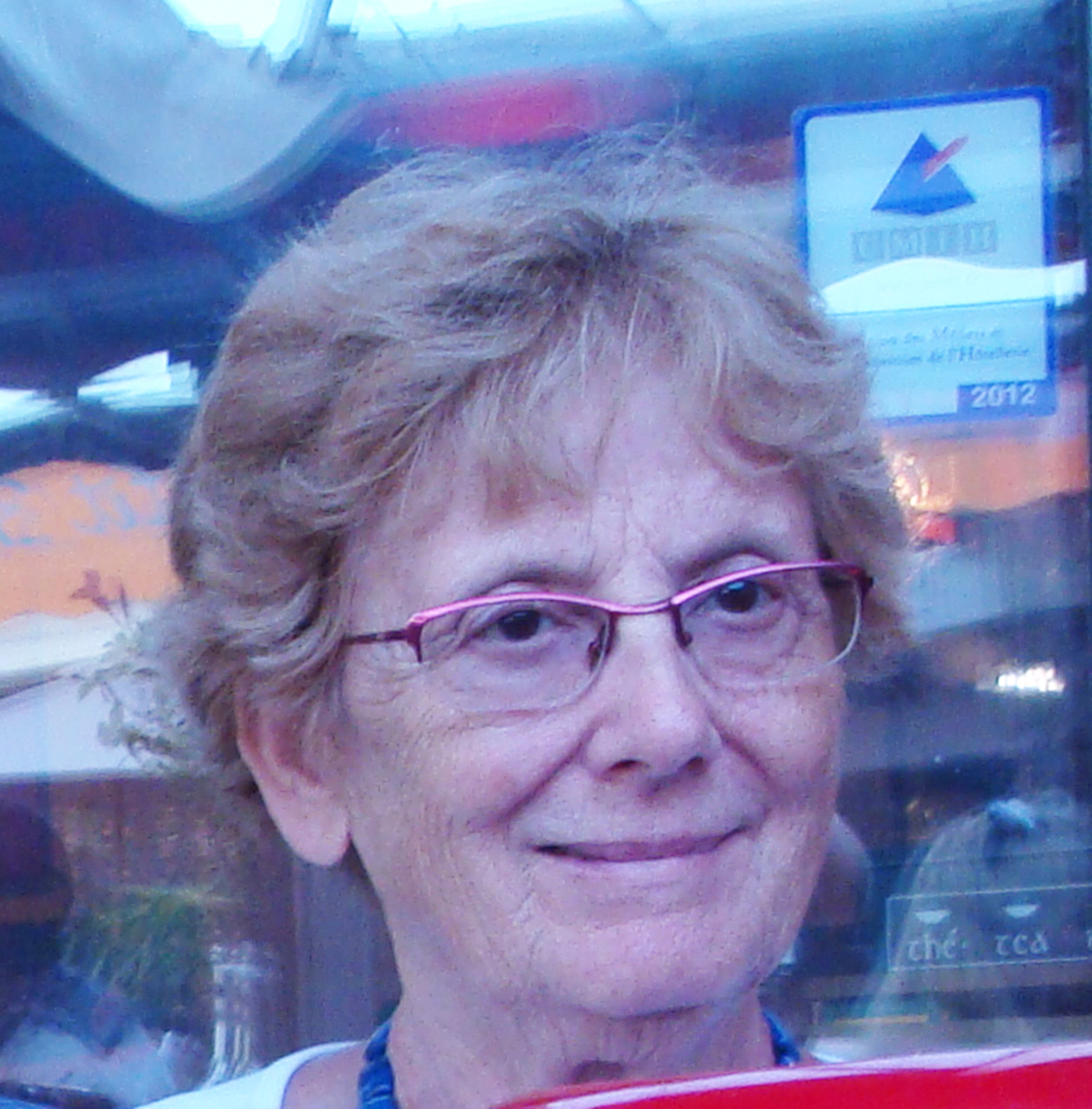
- Mourer-Chauviré in 2014
- Born: Cécile Chauviré; 5 November 1939 (age 86); Lyon, France
- Education: University of Lyon
- Spouse: Roland Mourer (m. 1964)
- Scientific career
- Fields: Avian palaeontology

Cécile Mourer-Chauviré (born 1939) is a French paleontologist specializing in birds of the Eocene and the Oligocene. In her early career, she discovered with her husband the Laang Spean cave site of prehistoric humans in Cambodia.

== Career ==
Cécile Chauviré was born on 5 November 1939 in Lyon, France. She studied at University of Lyon. Her early work was on large Quaternary mammals. She then proceeded in 1961 to a doctorate in Centre national de la recherche scientifique focusing on Pleistocene birds, a topic few at the time studied in France or Europe.

Following her marriage in 1964 to Roland Mourer, she relocated to Cambodia where he was assigned by the French military as a "coopérant" in Kampong Chhnang. In 1965 she was appointed as a geology professor at Royal University of Phnom Penh, a post she held until the civil war in 1970. During this time she discovered with her husband the Laang Spean cave site of prehistoric humans.

In 1970, at the outbreak of civil war in Cambodia, she returned with her two small children to France. In 1971, she secured an appointment with CNRS at Claude Bernard University Lyon 1. In 1975 she completed her "Thèse d’Etat", in 1984 her habilitation, and in 1985 she was appointed director of research in CNRS which she held until her retirement in 2005.

Since her return to France, and also following her retirement, she focused on research of avian fossils. Between 1987 and 1999 she was secretary of the Society of Avian Paleontology and Evolution (SAPE).

In 2011, she published with her colleagues on Lavocatavis africana, an African fossil that may belong to the Phorusrhacidae clade (terror birds). The Algerian find is significant as previous finds from the era in Africa were not land-dwelling birds and Phorusrhacidae was not previously known outside of the Americas.

Below is a list of taxa that Mourer-Chauviré has contributed to naming:

Year	Taxon	Authors
2024	Tegulavis corbalani gen. et sp. nov.	Mourer-Chauviré, Bourdon, Duffaud, Le Roux, & Laurent
2024	Papulavis annae gen. et sp. nov.	Mourer-Chauviré, Bourdon, Duffaud, Le Roux, & Laurent
2020	Gastornis laurenti sp. nov.	Mourer-Chauviré & Bourdon
2018	Aquila claudeguerini sp. nov.	Mourer-Chauviré & Bonifay
2016	Galligeranoides boriensis gen. et sp. nov.	Bourdon, Mourer-Chauviré, & Laurent
2015	Namapsitta praeruptorum gen. et sp. nov.	Mourer-Chauviré, Pickford, & Senut
2015	Scopelortyx klinghardtensis gen. et sp. nov.	Mourer-Chauviré, Pickford, & Senut
2013	Chambicuculus pusillus gen. et sp. nov.	Mourer-Chauviré, Tabuce, Essid, Marivaux, Khayati, Vianey-Liaud, & Ali
2013	Chambiortyx cristata gen. et sp. nov.	Mourer-Chauviré, Tabuce, Essid, Marivaux, Khayati, Vianey-Liaud, & Ali
2013	Miocoracias chenevali gen. et sp. nov.	Mourer-Chauviré, Peyrouse, & Hugueney
2011	Lavocatavis africana gen. et sp. nov.	Mourer-Chauviré, Tabuce, Mahboubi, Adaci, & Bensalah
2011	Hoazinavis lacustris gen. et sp. nov.	Mayr, Alvarenga, & Mourer-Chauviré
2010	Geronticus olsoni sp. nov.	Mourer-Chauviré & Geraads
2010	Plioperdix africana sp. nov.	Mourer-Chauviré & Geraads
2010	Agapornis atlanticus sp. nov.	Mourer-Chauviré & Geraads
2008	Pelagornis mauretanicus sp. nov.	Mourer-Chauviré & Geraads
2003	Amanuensis pickfordi gen. et sp. nov.	Mourer-Chauviré
1992	Quercymegapodius brodkorpi gen. et sp. nov.	Mourer-Chauviré

== Recognition ==
The eighth international meeting of SAPE, in 2012, was dedicated to Mourer-Chauviré in tribute to her role as founder and secretary.

Colleagues have honoured Mourer-Chauviré by naming fossil bird species and genera after her. As of 2013, the following were named after her: Aythya chauvirae, Cypseloides mourerchauvireae, Chauvireria balcanica, Pica mourerae , Oligosylphe mourerchauvireae, Tyto mourerchauvireae, Afrocygnus chauvireae, Asphaltoglaux cecileae.
