= Pelargopappus =

Scientific classification
- Kingdom: Animalia
- Phylum: Chordata
- Class: Aves
- Order: Accipitriformes
- Family: Sagittariidae
- Genus: †Pelargopappus; Stejneger, 1885
- Species: †P. magnus

Binomial name
- †Pelargopappus magnus (Milne-Edwards, 1868)

Extinct genus of birds

Pelargopappus is an extinct genus of raptor related to the secretarybird that lived in early Miocene France. Only one species, the type species P. magnus is officially recognized. A second species, P. schlosseri from the mid-and late Oligocene, was split off into the genus Amphisagittarius.

French paleontologist Cécile Mourer-Chauviré examined the bones of the two genera and concluded that the distal ends of tibiotarsi and tarsometatarsi were the same and that Amphisagittarius should be synonymised with Pelargopappus and supported the placement of the genus in Sagittariidae (rather than the stork family Ciconiidae). She added that Amynoptilon was also a synonym.
