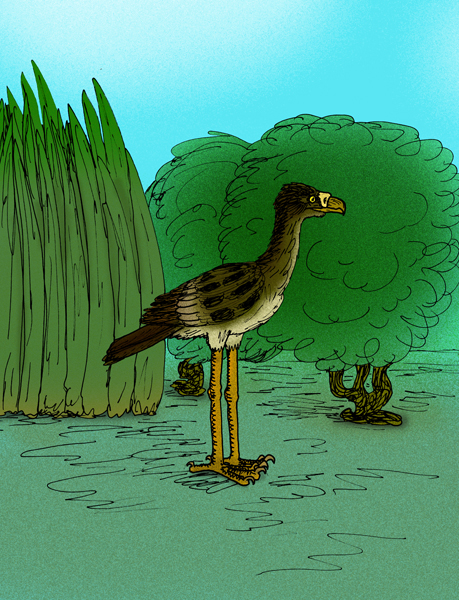
- artist's restoration

Scientific classification
- Kingdom: Animalia
- Phylum: Chordata
- Class: Aves
- Order: Accipitriformes
- Family: Accipitridae
- Genus: †Apatosagittarius; Feduccia & Voorhies, 1989
- Species: †A. terrenus

Binomial name
- †Apatosagittarius terrenus Feduccia & Voorhies, 1989

= Apatosagittarius =

Apatosagittarius Temporal range: Late Miocene

Extinct genus of birds

Apatosagittarius is an extinct monotypic genus of Accipitridae from the Late Miocene of Nebraska. Only one species has been described, Apatosagittarius terrenus. The genus name, which Feduccia and Voorhies translate as "false secretarybird," refers to the bird's superficial resemblance to the living secretary bird.
