= Amanuensis pickfordi =

Amanuensis pickfordi Temporal range: Burdigalian

Scientific classification
- Kingdom: Animalia
- Phylum: Chordata
- Class: Aves
- Order: Accipitriformes
- Family: Sagittariidae
- Genus: †Amanuensis
- Species: †A. pickfordi

Binomial name
- †Amanuensis pickfordi Mourer-Chauviré, 2003

Extinct genus of birds

Amanuensis is an extinct genus of the Sagittariidae that lived in the Miocene epoch. It contains the single species A. pickfordi.

== Distribution ==
Amanuensis pickfordi is known from fossils found in Namibia dating back to MN 4.
