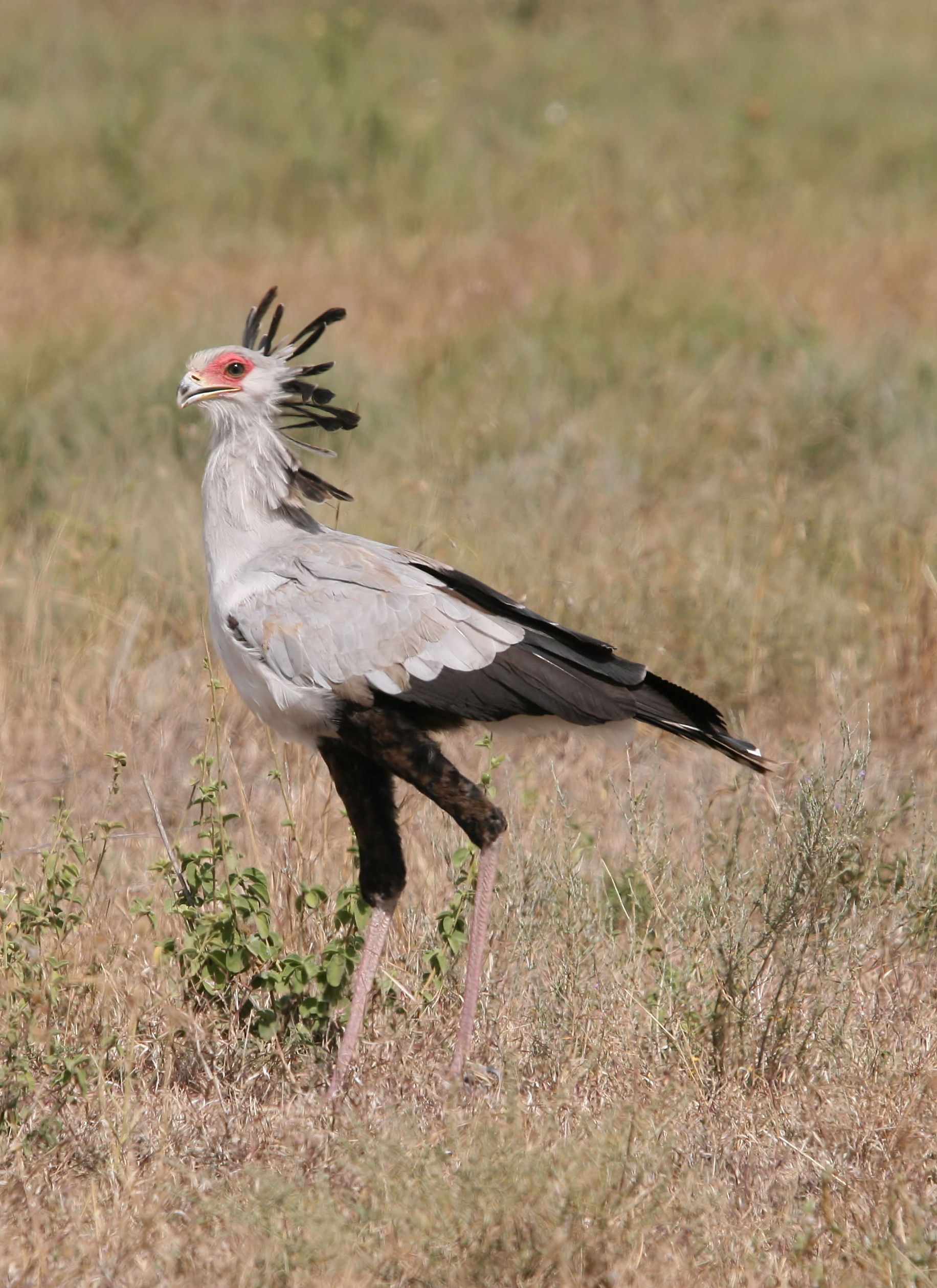
- Sagittarius serpentarius

Scientific classification
- Kingdom: Animalia
- Phylum: Chordata
- Class: Aves
- Order: Accipitriformes
- Family: Sagittariidae; Finsch & Hartlaub, 1870

Genera
- At least 4 genera (see text)

= Sagittariidae =

Sagittariidae Temporal range: Middle Oligocene–recent, 29–0 Ma

Family of birds

Sagittariidae is a family of raptor with one living species—the secretarybird (Sagittarius serpentarius) native to Africa—and a few fossil taxa.

This single extant species has affected the fossil record of the group by ‘pulling’ the temporal range of the family to the present, an artifact called the Pull of the recent.

German naturalists Otto Finsch and Gustav Hartlaub established the taxon name as a subfamily—Sagittariinae—in 1870. Although their term postdated Gypogeranidae of Vigors (1825) and Serpentariidae of Selys Longchamps (1842), the genus name Sagittarius (described in 1783) had priority over Gypogeranus Illiger, 1811 and Serpentarius Cuvier, 1798.

== Genera ==
There are at least four genera:

- †Amanuensis Mourer-Chauviré, 2003
- †Amphiserpentarius Gaillard, 1908
- †Pelargopappus Stejneger, 1885
- Sagittarius Hermann,1783

The genus Pelargopappus is known from Miocene deposits in France. The genus Amanuensis is known from Miocene deposits in Africa.
