= Laang Spean =

Cave and archaeological site in Cambodia

- ល្អាងស្ពាន (Khmer)
- Cave of Bridges
- location in Cambodia
- 12°51′N 102°55′E
- Type: Cave
- Periods: Upper Paleolithic, Middle Paleolithic, Neolithic
- Cultures: Hoabinhian
- Associated with: Paleo-humans
- Location: Treng Commune, Ratanakmundul district, Battambang Province, Cambodia
- Region: Mekong Floodplain
- Part of: Phnom Teak Treang hill

History
- Abandoned: around 3000 BP

Site notes
- Material: Permian marine limestone
- Height: 30 m (98 ft)
- Length: 63 m (207 ft)
- Width: 20 m (66 ft)
- Area: 1,200 m^{2} (13,000 sq ft)
- Excavation dates: 1965 to 1970, 2009 to present
- Archaeologists: Roland and Cecile Mourer; Hubert Forestier and Heng Sophady

Laang Spean (/ləˈæŋ spiən/; Khmer: ល្អាងស្ពាន, L’ang Spian [lʔaːŋ spiən]; "Cave of Bridges") is a prehistoric cave site on top of a limestone hill (Phnom Teak Treang) in Battambang Province, north-western Cambodia. The site's name Cave of Bridges references the multiple limestone arches (or bridges) that remain after the partial collapse of the cave's vault. Excavations are still in progress, and at least three distinct levels of ancient human occupation have been documented. At the site's deepest layers, around 5 meters below the ground, primitive flaked stone tools were unearthed, dating back to around 71,000 years BP. Higher layers contain records of the Hoabinhian (11,000 to 5,000 years BP), whose stratigraphic and chronological context has yet to be defined. Future excavations at Laang Spean might help clarify the nature of the Hoabinhian and provide new data on the Pleistocene/Holocene transition in the region.

== Documentation ==
Roland Mourer and Cécile Mourer-Chauviré, working for the Royal University of Phnom Penh, undertook the first excavations from 1965 to 1969 and revealed evidence of prehistoric human occupation in Laang Spean as old as 6,240 years BP. Objects found included tools made of hornfels, pottery, burnt animal bones, carbonized matter, mollusk shells and a great variety of microfauna remains. In a deeper middle layer, excavated artifacts and tools bore similarities to previously-discovered Hoabinhian sites in Southeast Asia. Thirty years of war and ten years of mine clearing prevented further excavations.

In 2009, the French Ministry for Europe and Foreign Affairs and Cambodian Ministry of Culture and Fine Arts began collaboration on the French-Cambodian Prehistoric Mission. The team was led by Hubert Forestier, a professor of prehistory at the National Museum of Natural History, and Heng Sophady, an archaeologist and deputy director of the cultural heritage department of the Ministry of Culture. The team of archaeologists and students resumed work in room number two (the central part of the cave) over a surface of more than 40 m^{2} (430 sq ft) that has provided new stratigraphic, chronocultural and archaeo-zoological results. As of 2016, 20 stratigraphic units were recorded on a ground surface of 1,000 m^{2} (11,000 sq ft) to a depth of five meters without reaching the bedrock.

The Neolithic burial sites of four men and one woman dating from 3,700 to 3,300 years BP were found in one of the top layers. Some graves were lavishly adorned with stone jewelry while others lacked adornment, suggesting emergent social stratification among the population; the find provided researchers with "an original chronological, cultural landmark for South-East Asia, at the beginning of the Ages of Metal".

The Hoabinhian level (later hunter–gatherers) contains split pebble tools and abundant faunal remains that date between 11,000 and 5,000 years BP.

The team uncovered rudimentary stone tools (chert flakes and polyhedral, multiplatform cores) in the deepest Palaeolithic levels as old as 71,000 years BP.

== See also ==
- Tam Pa Ling Cave
- Early hominids in Southeast Asia
