= Mogontiacopsitta =

Mogontiacopsitta Temporal range: Late Oligocene–Early Miocene

Scientific classification
- Kingdom: Animalia
- Phylum: Chordata
- Class: Aves
- Order: Psittaciformes
- Genus: †Mogontiacopsitta; Gerald Mayr, 2010
- Species: †M. miocaena

Binomial name
- †Mogontiacopsitta miocaena G. Mayr, 2010

Extinct genus of birds

Mogontiacopsitta is a genus of prehistoric parrot which existed in Mainz Basin, Germany during the late Oligocene or early Miocene. It was described by Gerald Mayr in 2010, from an incomplete tarsometatarsus. The type species is Mogontiacopsitta miocaena.
