= Pull of the recent =

Erroneous practice in palaeontology

The Pull of the Recent (POR) describes a phenomenon in which a combination of factors causes palaeontologists to overestimate diversity towards the present day. Biased preservation and sampling in the fossil record results in past biodiversity estimates to be lower with modern taxa being considered more diverse because present biodiversity is the best sampled. However the overall impact of the POR does not seem to be as large as originally thought.

== Marine invertebrates ==
Sepkoski showed a global increase in marine biodiversity since the Cambrian. The cause of this, according to the Pull of the Recent, is due to favourable sampling by taphonomic processes of more recent fossils (time proportional to destruction of all geological records), as well as the ease of studying extant taxa. However, the impact of the POR has may not be as strong as previously thought and that this bias may diminishes with more detailed study. The POR was believed to distort the shape of marine invertebrate palaeodiversity significantly, with almost half of genera affected. However, further exploration of the data, for bivalves at least, showed that this was mostly the result of errors and unresolved taxonomies and that when these were corrected, the effect of the POR dwindled to 9%, and then to 5% when more recently discovered taxa were added. Analysis of Cenozoic bivalves showed 95% of living genera have fossil representatives dating back to the Pliocene.

== Fish ==
Researchers counted the proportion of extant elasmobranchs that have a fossil record, but also have a gap in the last 5 million years in the Pliocene and Pleistocene. The findings demonstrate that the POR does not affect orders and families, but it does affect 24% of elasmobranch genera.

== Tetrapods ==
The fossil record of terrestrial vertebrates which include amphibians, reptiles, mammals, and birds, is not significantly effected by the Pull of the Recent (POR). A comprehensive study showed that the expansion of tetrapod biodiversity in the past 120 million years is a real biological pattern. The POR accounts for at most 6.1% of the increase in tetrapod family diversity and 1.3% of generic diversity. Small animals, insectivores, and birds are most affected by the POR, perhaps because of their delicate skeletons.

== Biases ==
It could be that the POR effects certain types of organisms more than others. Among vertebrates, all affected taxa are small to medium in size except one small family of birds, Sagittariidae and a genus of snake, Eunectes. Similarly, size is a bias of the POR for marine bivalves and for completeness of the fossil record in general. It is possible that future discoveries of new Pliocene and Pleistocene fossils may be predominantly animals with small, fragile skeletons.

== Overall impact ==
While undoubtedly there are gaps in the fossil record, there is no reason to believe that the POR has significantly influenced the observed palaeodiversity patterns of skeletonized organisms that have been tabulated from the tetrapod fossil record. This means that the great expansion of tetrapod diversity in the past 120 Myr is reasonably accurate.

== See also ==
- Push of the past
- Macroevolution
- Punctuated equilibrium
- Red Queen hypothesis
- Red King hypothesis
- Court Jester hypothesis
