= Agapornis atlanticus =

Agapornis atlanticus Temporal range: Piacenzian

Scientific classification
- Kingdom: Animalia
- Phylum: Chordata
- Class: Aves
- Order: Psittaciformes
- Family: Psittaculidae
- Genus: Agapornis
- Species: †A. atlanticus

Binomial name
- †Agapornis atlanticus Mourer-Chauviré & Geraads, 2010

Extinct species of parrot

Agapornis atlanticus is an extinct species of Agapornis parrot that lived during the Piacenzian stage of the Pliocene epoch.

== Distribution ==
Agapornis atlanticus fossils are known from the site of Ahl al Oughlam in Morocco, located near the city of Casablanca.

== Paleoenvironment ==
All known specimens of Agapornis atlanticus originate from the cave deposits of Ahl al Oughlam near Casablanca, Morocco. The deposits of this locality were most likely formed 2.5 million years ago, though could potentially have been laid down at any point between 2.8 and 2.4 million years ago, ranging from the Piacenzian stage of the Late Pliocene epoch across the Pliocene-Pleistocene boundary into the Gelasian stage of the Early Pleistocene epoch. The fossil assemblage of Ahl al Oughlam is believed to have originated from an open landscape with only sparse wood cover and no large permanent sources of freshwater, as indicated by the absence of tree-dwelling monkeys and near-absence of any forest or woodland bovids, whereas remains of desert-adapted gerbilline rodents are by far the most numerous fossils from this site. The mixture of species associated with cooler temperatures (such as the walrus Ontocetus emmonsi) and warmer climates (such as A. atlanticus) may suggest that the site had high seasonality, and these species may have been seasonal visitors to the area rather than permanent residents. Most of the large animal bones were found beneath a vertical chimney, suggesting at least some animals fell into the cave from above, though many were likely kills brought in by carnivores using the cave as shelter. The carcasses gathered in the pit may have attracted more carnivores to scavenge on them, only to end up trapped themselves.
