= Miocoracias =

Miocoracias Temporal range: Early Miocene

Scientific classification
- Kingdom: Animalia
- Phylum: Chordata
- Class: Aves
- Order: Coraciiformes
- Family: Coraciidae
- Genus: †Miocoracias
- Species: †M. chenevali

Binomial name
- †Miocoracias chenevali Mourer-Chauviré et al., 2013

Extinct genus of birds

Miocoracias is an extinct genus of coraciid that lived during the Early Miocene.

== Distribution ==
Miocoracias chenevali is known from the site of Saint-Gérard-le-Puy in France.
