= Chambiortyx =

Chambiortyx Temporal range: Early Eocene

Scientific classification
- Domain: Eukaryota
- Kingdom: Animalia
- Phylum: Chordata
- Class: Aves
- Superorder: Galloanserae
- Clade: Pangalliformes
- Genus: †Chambiortyx; Mourer-Chauviré et al., 2013

Type species
- †Chambiortyx cristata (Mourer-Chauviré et al., 2013)

Extinct genus of birds

Chambiortyx is a genus of pangalliform bird. It is known from a fossil of the early Eocene of Tunisia.
