= Ahl al Oughlam =

Archaeological and palaeontological site in Morocco

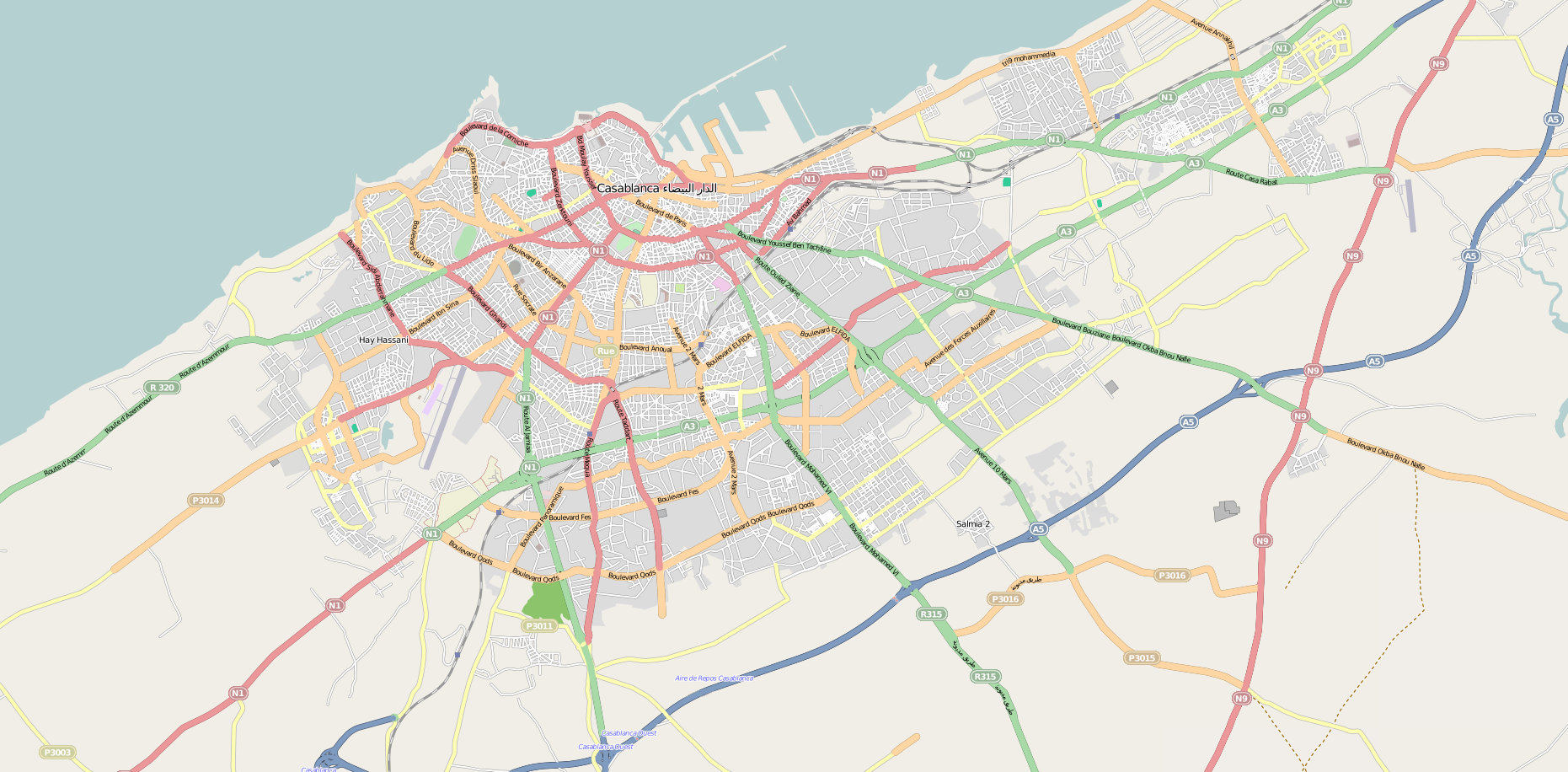
- Location within Greater Casablanca Location within Morocco
- 33°34′5.56″N 7°30′42.73″W

Ahl al Oughlam is an archaeological site and palaeontological site located just outside Casablanca, Morocco. It was discovered in 1985 and first excavated in 1989. Ahl al Oughlam is the richest late Neogene vertebrate locality of North Africa. It has also yielded the area's first important carnivore fauna, including 23 taxa, 13 of which are new.

== See also ==
- Taforalt
