= Mainz Basin =

The Mainz Basin (German: Mainzer Becken) or Rhine-Main Basin is the name given to a Cenozoic marine basin that covered the area of the present-day region of Rhenish Hesse in Germany about 38 to 12 million years ago (38 - 12 mya). The Mainz Basin was a bay or sea inlet, that for a short time in the Palaeogene period connected the then North Sea (part of the gradually widening North Atlantic during the Palaeogene) with the Paratethys Sea (part of the shrinking Tethys Ocean).

== See also ==
- Mainz Sand Dunes
- Paris Basin
