= Geronticus olsoni =

Geronticus olsoni Temporal range: Piacenzian

Scientific classification
- Kingdom: Animalia
- Phylum: Chordata
- Class: Aves
- Order: Pelecaniformes
- Family: Threskiornithidae
- Genus: Geronticus
- Species: †G. olsoni

Binomial name
- †Geronticus olsoni Mourer-Chauviré & Geraads, 2010

Extinct species of bird

Geronticus olsoni is an extinct species of Geronticus that lived during the Piacenzian.

== Distribution ==
Geronticus olsoni is known from the site of Ahl al Oughlam in Morocco near Casablanca.
