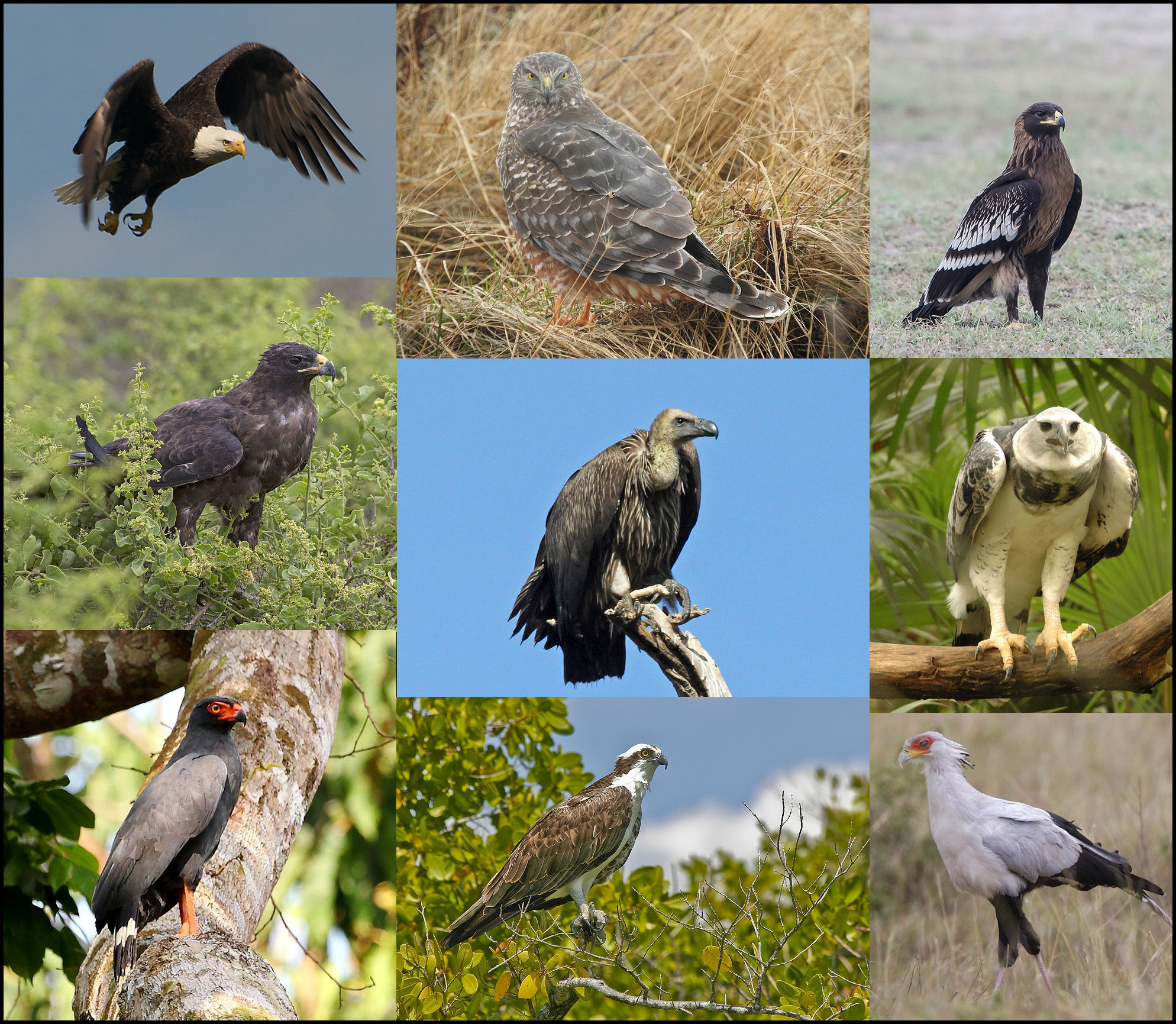
- Clockwise from top left: Bald eagle (Haliaeetus leucocephalus), cinereous harrier (Circus cinereus), greater spotted eagle (Clanga clanga), harpy eagle (Harpia harpyja), secretarybird (Sagittarius serpentarius), osprey (Pandion haliaetus), slate-colored hawk (Buteogallus schistaceus), Galapagos hawk (Buteo galapagoensis), white-backed vulture (Gyps africanus) (center). All belong to Accipitriformes.

Scientific classification
- Kingdom: Animalia
- Phylum: Chordata
- Class: Aves
- Clade: Accipitrimorphae
- Order: Accipitriformes; Vieillot, 1816

Subdivisions
- Sagittariidae; Pandionidae; Accipitridae
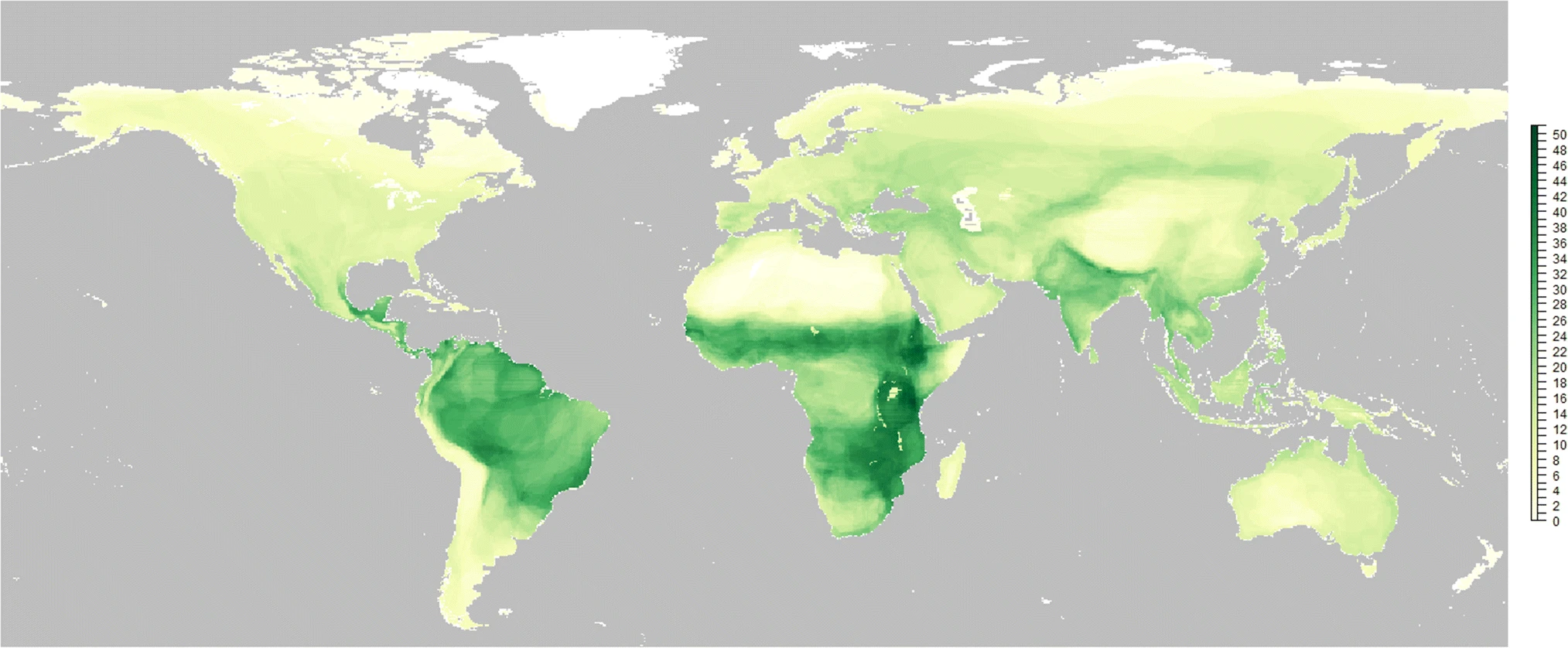
- Diversity map of Accipitriformes. The colour gradient (from light to dark) indicates species richness.

= Accipitriformes =

Accipitriformes Temporal range: Eocene-present, 50–0 Ma

Order of birds

The Accipitriformes (/ækˌsɪpɪtrɪˈfɔːrmiːz/; from Latin accipiter 'hawk' and formes 'having the form of') are an order of birds that includes most of the diurnal birds of prey, including hawks, eagles, Old World vultures, kites, ospreys and secretary birds, but not falcons or seriemas. The generally nocturnal owls, also considered birds of prey, are a separate order from the accipitriforms.

Historically, accipitriforms were grouped with falcons in the broadly defined order Falconiformes. However, molecular phylogenetic studies, including Hackett et al. (2008), showed that this traditional grouping was polyphyletic: falcons are more closely related to parrots and passerines than to accipitriforms. Modern ornithological checklists recognize Accipitriformes and Falconiformes as separate orders, with Falconiformes placed immediately before Psittaciformes in taxonomic sequence.

In Hackett et al. (2008), the clade uniting New World vultures with other accipitriform birds received relatively weak support. Citing both this uncertainty and the evolutionary distinctiveness of the group, the SACC recognized Cathartiformes as a separate order in 2008, whereas other authorities included Cathartidae within Accipitriformes. Later phylogenomic studies strongly supported the sister-group relationship between Cathartidae and Accipitriformes, while also revealing their deep evolutionary divergence. Recognition of Cathartiformes as a separate order subsequently became more widespread.

== Characteristics ==
The Accipitriformes are known from the Middle Eocene and typically have a sharply hooked beak with a soft cere housing the nostrils. Their wings are long and fairly broad, suitable for soaring flight, with the outer four to six primary feathers emarginated.

They have strong legs and feet with raptorial claws and opposable hind claws. Almost all Accipitriformes are carnivorous, hunting by sight during the day or at twilight. They are exceptionally long-lived, and most have low reproductive rates.

The young have a long, very fast-growing fledgling stage, followed by 3–8 weeks of nest care after first flight, and 1 to 3 years as sexually immature adults. The sexes have conspicuously different sizes and sometimes a female is more than twice as heavy as her mate. This sexual dimorphism is sometimes most extreme in specialized bird-eaters, such as the Accipiter hawks. Monogamy is the general rule, although an alternative mate is often selected if one dies.

== Taxonomy ==
The order includes the following families: Order Accipitriformes

- Accipitridae (eagles, harriers, erns, hawks, kites, Old World vultures)
- Pandionidae (ospreys) (1 or 2 species)
- Sagittariidae (secretarybird)

For a complete list of species, see list of Accipitriformes species.

- Accipitriformes
  - Sagittariidae
  - - Pandionidae
    - Accipitridae

Phylogeny of Accipitriformes based on Nagy, J. & Tökölyi, J. (2014).
