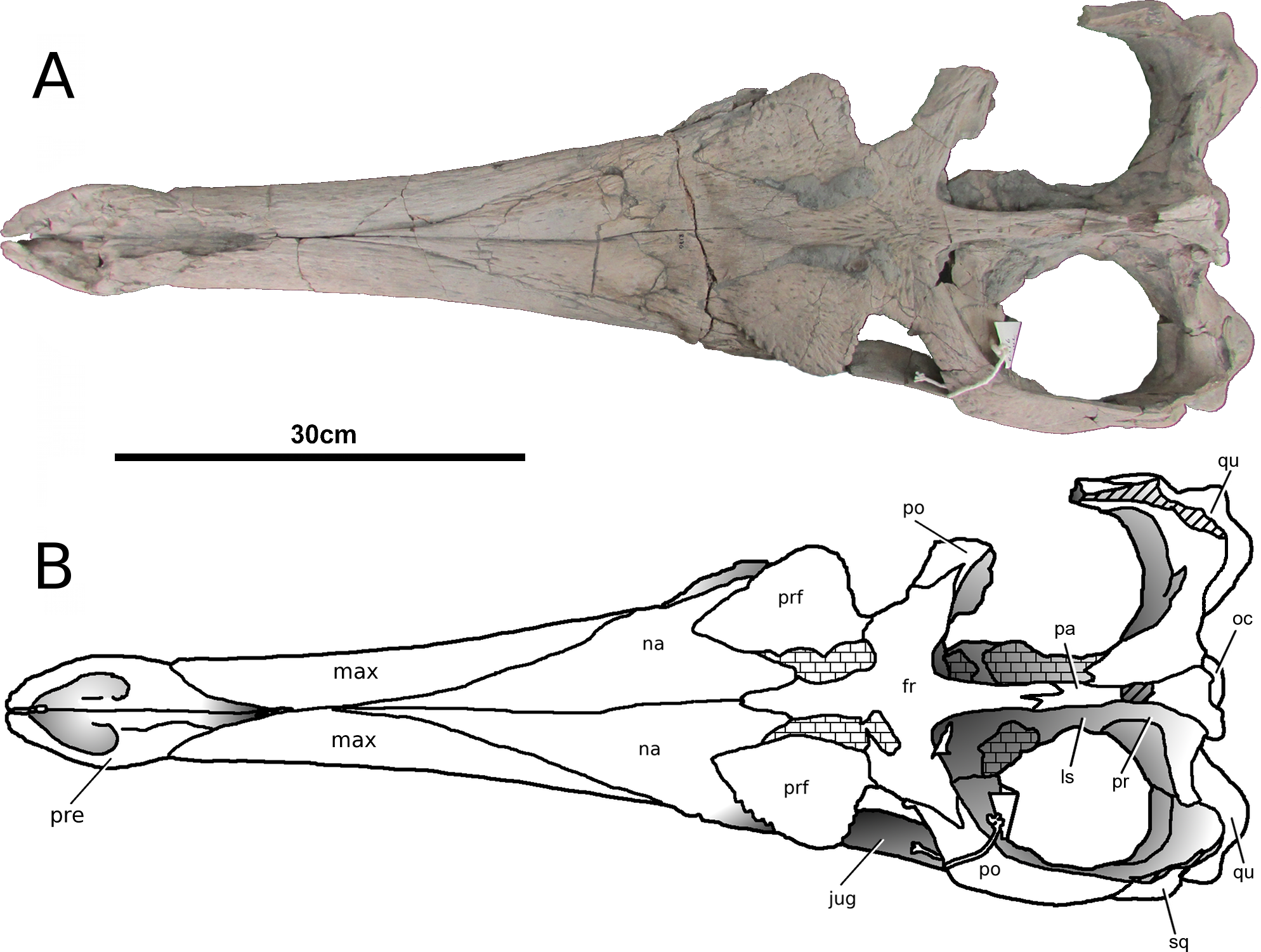
- Skull in dorsal view (PETMG: R176)

Scientific classification
- Kingdom: Animalia
- Phylum: Chordata
- Class: Reptilia
- Clade: Pseudosuchia
- Clade: Crocodylomorpha
- Suborder: †Thalattosuchia
- Family: †Metriorhynchidae
- Subfamily: †Geosaurinae
- Genus: †Tyrannoneustes; Young et al., 2013

Type species
- †Tyrannoneustes lythrodectikos Young et al., 2013

= Tyrannoneustes =

Tyrannoneustes Temporal range: Callovian
- Skull diagram of an adult specimen, in different views.

Extinct genus of reptiles

Tyrannoneustes is an extinct genus of geosaurine metriorhynchid crocodyliform from the Callovian stage Oxford Clay Formation of England and the Marnes de Dives of France. It contains a single species, Tyrannoneustes lythrodectikos, meaning "blood-biting tyrant swimmer".

== History and description ==
Size comparison of different known specimens

The genus was rediscovered after a century of storage in a museum basement after being unearthed by fossil hunter Alfred Nicholson Leeds between the years of 1907 and 1909. Its jaws were relatively robust and its teeth were large and blade-like, likely built to attack prey as large or larger than itself, similar to the Late Jurassic Dakosaurus, Torvoneustes, and Plesiosuchus. The holotype specimen (CLAHM V972) had a 67 cm (26 in) long jaw. while others known individuals were larger, with skull and jaws around the 1 m (3.3 ft) mark in length.

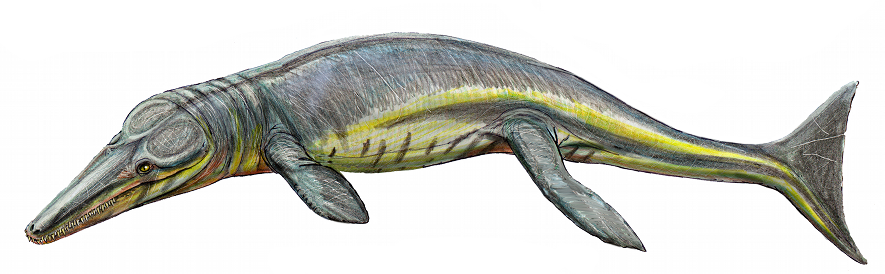
Restoration

== Classification ==
Tyrannoneustes is a member of the metriorhynchid subfamily called Geosaurinae and the derived tribe Geosaurini. Members were generally large marine predators, adapted to open-ocean life with streamlined bodies, powerful tails, and long, robust jaws lined with sharp teeth.

The cladogram below is from an analysis by Léa Girard and colleagues in their description of Torvoneustes jurensis.

- Geosaurinae
  - - "Metriorhynchus" casamiquelai
    - "Metriorhynchus" westermanii
  - - Neptunidraco ammoniticus
    - - “Metriorhynchus" brachyrhynchus
      - Geosaurini
        - - - - Geosaurina
                - Ieldraan melkshamensis
                - - Geosaurus grandis
                  - - Geosaurus giganteus
                    - Geosaurus lapparenti
              - - Plesiosuchina
                  - Suchodus durobrivensis
                  - Plesiosuchus manselii
                - Dakosaurina
                  - Mr Leeds dakosaur
                  - - Vaches Noires dakosaur
                    - - Dakosaurus maximus
                      - Dakosaurus andiniensis
        - "Subclade T"
          - Tyrannoneustes lythrodectikos
          - - Purranisaurus potens
            - - "E Clade"
                - Swiss snout
                - - Druegendorf Taxon
                  - - Chouquet cf. hastifer
                    - - English snout
                      - Mr. Passmores Specimen
              - Torvoneustes
                - Torvoneustes coryphaeus
                - - cf. Torvoneustes
                  - - Torvoneustes sp.
                    - - Torvoneustes mexicanus
                      - - Torvoneustes jurensis
                        - Torvoneustes carpenteri
