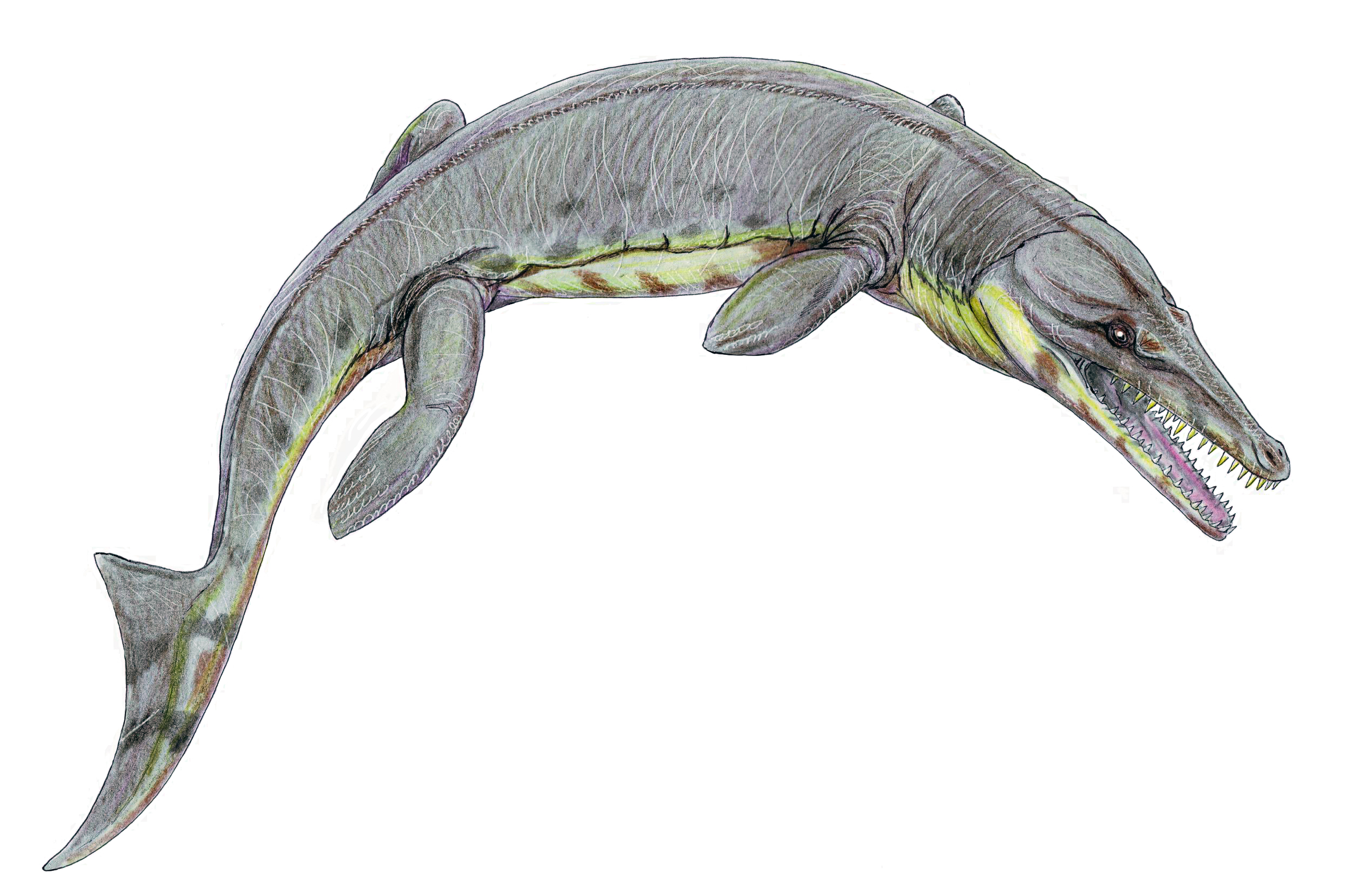
- Restoration of S. durobrivensis

Scientific classification
- Kingdom: Animalia
- Phylum: Chordata
- Class: Reptilia
- Clade: Pseudosuchia
- Clade: Crocodylomorpha
- Suborder: †Thalattosuchia
- Family: †Metriorhynchidae
- Subtribe: †Plesiosuchina
- Genus: †Suchodus; Lydekker, 1890

Type species
- †Suchodus durobrivensis Lydekker, 1890

= Suchodus =

Suchodus Temporal range: Callovian - Oxfordian, 167–160 Ma
- Skull diagram of different specimens assigned to the species

Extinct genus of reptiles

Size comparison of different specimens assigned to the species

Suchodus is an extinct genus of metriorhynchid thalattosuchian from the Middle to Late Jurassic period of England and France It was a fully marine reptile that would have fed on other large marine fauna.

== Taxonomy and phylogeny ==
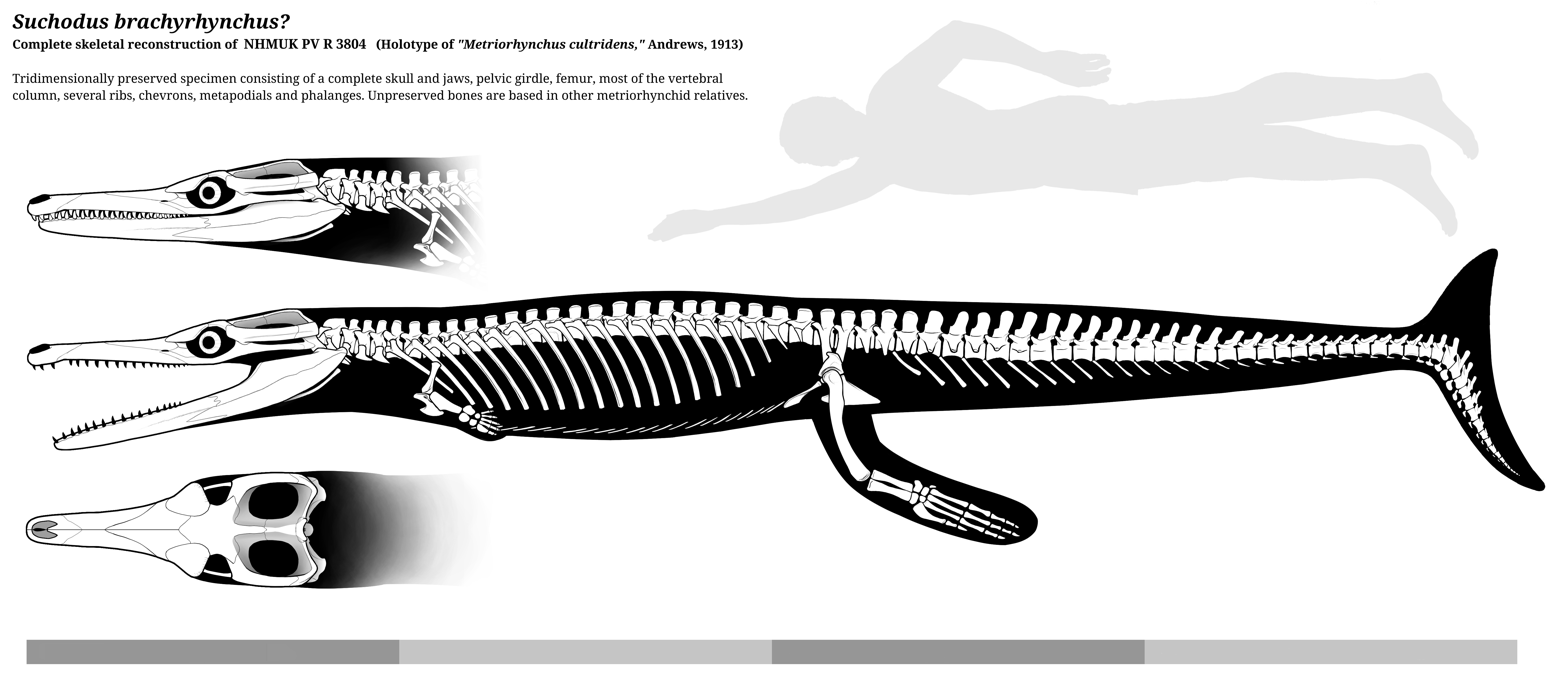
Skeletal reconstruction of the holotype of "Metriorhynchus cultridens", sometimes considered as Suchodus brachyrhynchus

Suchodus was originally described by Richard Lydekker in 1890, based on a flattened front part of a lower jaw (NHMUK PV R 1994) collected from the Oxford Clay near Peterborough, with the type species being S. durobrivensis. Remains of this species have also been reported from the Marnes de Dives of Normandy in Northern France. The genus was regarded as a junior synonym of Metriorhynchus by Andrews, 1913. Later studies from the 2000s onwards questioned this synonymy. Some authors have also included the species "S." brachyrhynchus, originally described for a specimen from the Callovian of Mesnil Bavent, Normandy, within the genus. Its placement in Suchodus has been questioned, and it has otherwise assigned to the genus Metriorhynchus or argued that it should be placed in its own new genus.

== Classification ==
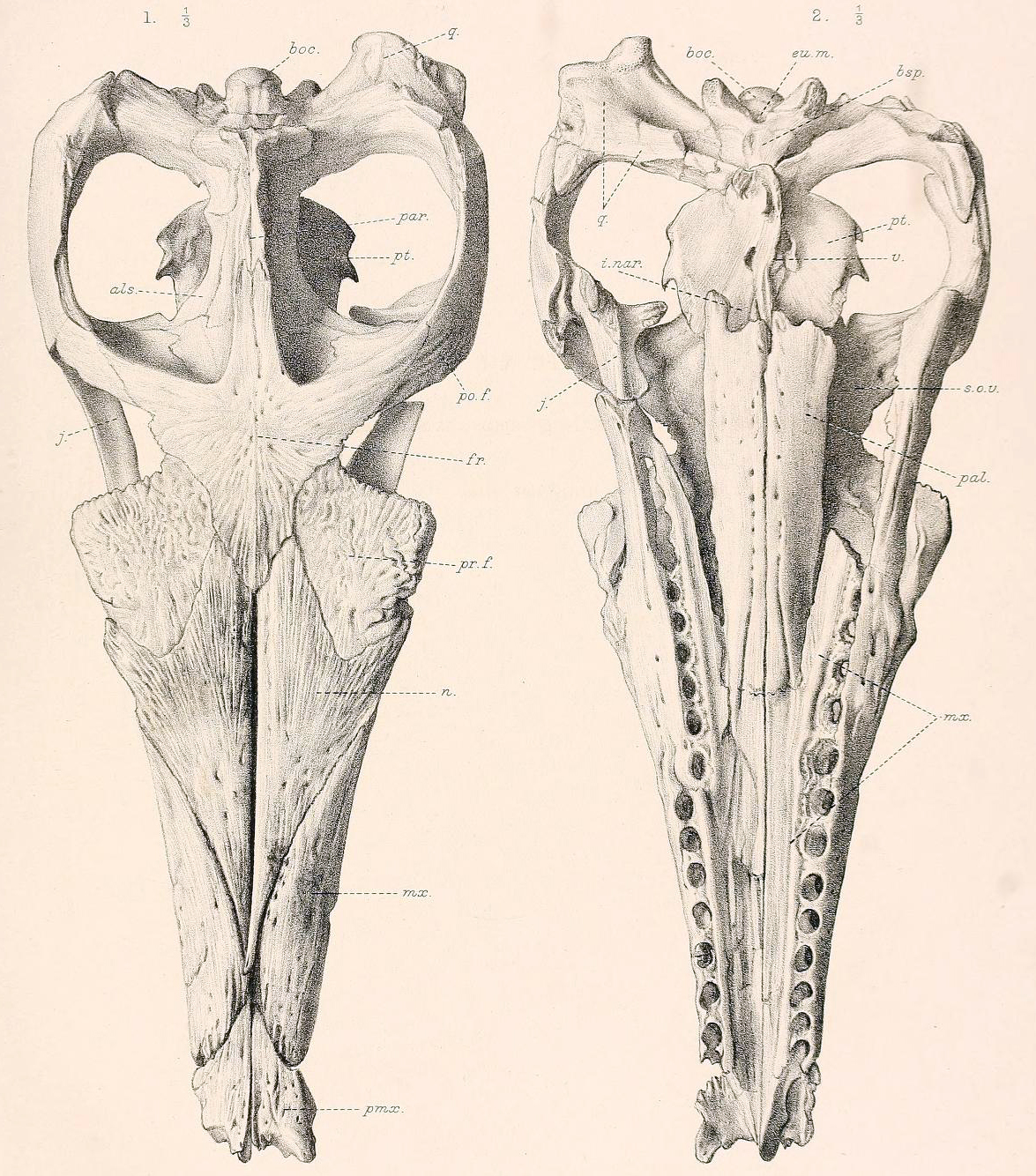
Skull of a juvenile (NHMUK PV R 2618)

Suchodus is a member of the metriorhynchid subfamily called Geosaurinae and the derived tribe Geosaurini. Members were generally large marine predators, adapted to open-ocean life with streamlined bodies, powerful tails, and long, robust jaws lined with sharp teeth. Suchodus is most closely related to the genus Plesiosuchus, both forming the group Plesiosuchina.

The cladogram below is from an analysis by Léa Girard and colleagues in their description of Torvoneustes jurensis.

- Geosaurinae
  - - "Metriorhynchus" casamiquelai
    - "Metriorhynchus" westermanii
  - - Neptunidraco ammoniticus
    - - "Metriorhynchus" brachyrhynchus
      - Geosaurini
        - - - - Geosaurina
                - Ieldraan melkshamensis
                - - Geosaurus grandis
                  - - Geosaurus giganteus
                    - Geosaurus lapparenti
              - - Plesiosuchina
                  - Suchodus durobrivensis
                  - Plesiosuchus manselii
                - Dakosaurina
                  - Mr Leeds dakosaur
                  - - Vaches Noires dakosaur
                    - - Dakosaurus maximus
                      - Dakosaurus andiniensis
        - "Subclade T"
          - Tyrannoneustes lythrodectikos
          - - Purranisaurus potens
            - - "E Clade"
                - Swiss snout
                - - Druegendorf Taxon
                  - - Chouquet cf. hastifer
                    - - English snout
                      - Mr. Passmores Specimen
              - Torvoneustes
                - Torvoneustes coryphaeus
                - - cf. Torvoneustes
                  - - Torvoneustes sp.
                    - - Torvoneustes mexicanus
                      - - Torvoneustes jurensis
                        - Torvoneustes carpenteri
