= Ieldraan =

Ieldraan Temporal range: Middle Jurassic, Callovian

Scientific classification
- Kingdom: Animalia
- Phylum: Chordata
- Class: Reptilia
- Clade: Pseudosuchia
- Clade: Crocodylomorpha
- Suborder: †Thalattosuchia
- Family: †Metriorhynchidae
- Subtribe: †Geosaurina
- Genus: †Ieldraan; Foffa et al., 2017
- Species: †I. melkshamensis

Binomial name
- †Ieldraan melkshamensis Foffa et al., 2017

Extinct genus of reptiles

Ieldraan is an extinct genus of metriorhynchid thalattosuchian from the Jurassic (Callovian) period Oxford Clay Formation of England. The sole species known is Ieldraan melkshamensis. Researchers have derived a body length estimate of 2.95 to 3.22 m (9.7 to 10.6 ft) based on a 55–60 cm (1 ft 10 in – 2 ft 0 in) long basicranium that was discovered during the 1870s.

== History ==
The type specimen NHMUK PV OR 46797, consisting of a fragmentary and damaged skull, was first discovered in 1870's from the Oxford Clay Formation. Before being described, the specimen was informally known as the 'Melksham monster', as it was discovered near the English town of Melksham. The sole genus and species, Ieldraan melkshamensis, was formally described in 2017 by Davide Foffa and colleagues. The genus name derives from Old English words Ieldra and an, meaning "older one" in reference to its older age compared to its relatives, while the species name references the town Melksham.

== Evolution and Classification ==
Ieldraan is a member of the derived group of large macropredatory metriorhynchids called Geosaurini. Within that, it is forms a clade with the genus Geosaurus, called Geosaurina.

The description of Ieldraan showed that members of Geosaurini evolved and diversified up to 10 million years earlier than previously thought. Additionally, adaptations for feeding on large prey were present in geosaurins earlier than realized, now at least by the Callovian stage of the Middle Jurassic. These show that this group didn't diversify as suddenly as previously thought, showing an earlier and more gradual radiation in species and traits.

The cladogram below is from a 2023 analysis by Léa Girard and colleagues in their description of Torvoneustes jurensis.

- Geosaurinae
  - - "Metriorhynchus" casamiquelai
    - "Metriorhynchus" westermanii
  - - Neptunidraco ammoniticus
    - - "Metriorhynchus" brachyrhynchus
      - Geosaurini
        - - - - Geosaurina
                - Ieldraan melkshamensis
                - - Geosaurus grandis
                  - - Geosaurus giganteus
                    - Geosaurus lapparenti
              - - Plesiosuchina
                  - Suchodus durobrivensis
                  - Plesiosuchus manselii
                - Dakosaurina
                  - Mr Leeds dakosaur
                  - - Vaches Noires dakosaur
                    - - Dakosaurus maximus
                      - Dakosaurus andiniensis
        - "Subclade T"
          - Tyrannoneustes lythrodectikos
          - - Purranisaurus potens
            - - "E Clade"
                - Swiss snout
                - - Druegendorf Taxon
                  - - Chouquet cf. hastifer
                    - - English snout
                      - Mr. Passmores Specimen
              - Torvoneustes
                - Torvoneustes coryphaeus
                - - cf. Torvoneustes
                  - - Torvoneustes sp.
                    - - Torvoneustes mexicanus
                      - - Torvoneustes jurensis
                        - Torvoneustes carpenteri
