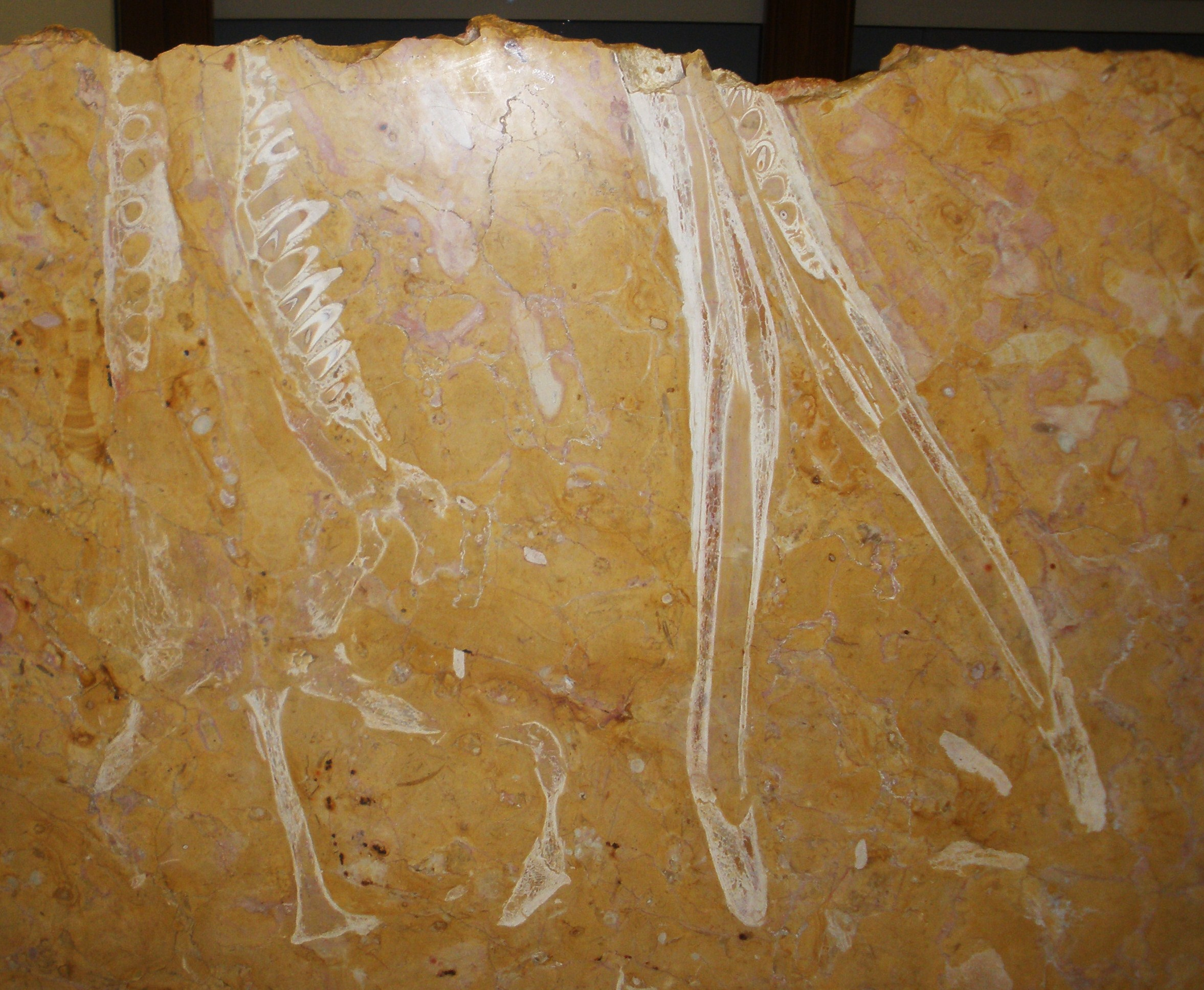
- Holotype

Scientific classification
- Kingdom: Animalia
- Phylum: Chordata
- Class: Reptilia
- Clade: Pseudosuchia
- Clade: Crocodylomorpha
- Suborder: †Thalattosuchia
- Family: †Metriorhynchidae
- Subfamily: †Geosaurinae
- Genus: †Neptunidraco; Cau & Fanti, 2011

Species
- N. ammoniticus Cau & Fanti, 2011 (type)

= Neptunidraco =

Neptunidraco Temporal range: Middle Jurassic, 167.7–164.7 Ma

Extinct genus of reptiles

Neptunidraco (meaning "Neptune's dragon") is an extinct genus of metriorhynchid thalattosuchian that lived during the middle Jurassic period (late Bajocian to earliest Bathonian stage) in what is now northeastern Italy. It is currently the oldest known metriorhynchid, an extinct group of fully marine reptiles related to modern crocodylians.

== History and Taxonomy ==
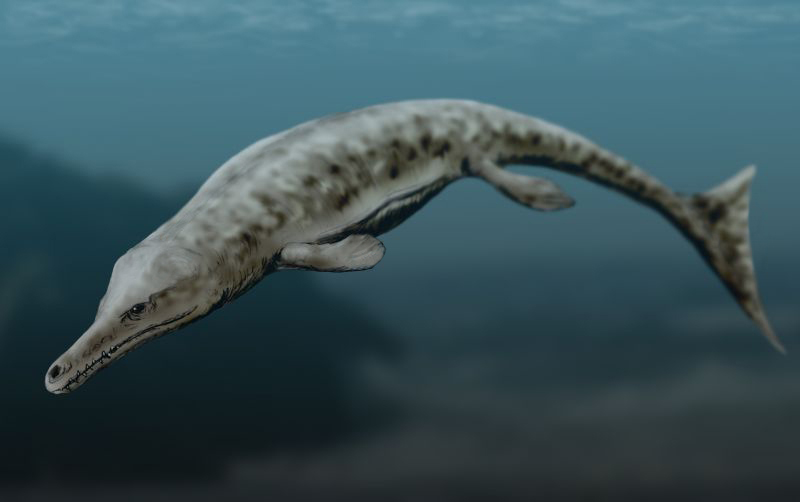
An artist's interpretation

The type specimen was recovered in the 1950s near the Italian town of Portomaggiore. The specimen, informally known as the "Portomaggiore crocodile", comprises a partial skeleton, including an incomplete skull with mandible, preserved in nodular limestone of the Rosso Ammonitico Veronese Formation. It represents the most complete metriorhynchid specimen known from Italy. Before its formal description, the specimen was provisionally assigned to an indeterminate species of either Metriorhynchus or Geosaurus.

In 2011, Italian paleontologists Andrea Cau and Federico Fanti named this specimen as the new genus Neptunidraco, containing the single species Neptunidraco ammoniticus. The full name translates to "Neptune’s dragon from the Rosso Ammonitico Veronese Formation", in reference to the Roman sea god Neptune and the geologic formation it was discovered in.

In 2013, Cau suggested that the possible specimen of this genus, MGP-PD 26552 (catalog erroneously spelled as 6552, the intended type specimen of the informal name "Steneosaurus barettoni"), would have measured 3.7 m (12 ft) in total body length, though the 2023 study suggested that the specimen belongs to a separate indeterminate metriorhynchid.

== Classification ==
Neptunidraco is a member of the metriorhynchid subfamily called Geosaurinae, a group generally consisting of large marine predators that were adapted to open-ocean life. It is closely related to, but not part of, the more derived tribe Geosaurini, whose members were the largest and exhibited the most pronounced morphological adaptations for predation on large-bodied prey.

The cladogram below is from an analysis by Léa Girard and colleagues in their description of Torvoneustes jurensis.

- Geosaurinae
  - - "Metriorhynchus" casamiquelai
    - "Metriorhynchus" westermanii
  - - Neptunidraco ammoniticus
    - - “Metriorhynchus" brachyrhynchus
      - Geosaurini
        - - - - Geosaurina
                - Ieldraan melkshamensis
                - - Geosaurus grandis
                  - - Geosaurus giganteus
                    - Geosaurus lapparenti
              - - Plesiosuchina
                  - Suchodus durobrivensis
                  - Plesiosuchus manselii
                - Dakosaurina
                  - Mr Leeds dakosaur
                  - - Vaches Noires dakosaur
                    - - Dakosaurus maximus
                      - Dakosaurus andiniensis
        - "Subclade T"
          - Tyrannoneustes lythrodectikos
          - - Purranisaurus potens
            - - "E Clade"
                - Swiss snout
                - - Druegendorf Taxon
                  - - Chouquet cf. hastifer
                    - - English snout
                      - Mr. Passmores Specimen
              - Torvoneustes
                - Torvoneustes coryphaeus
                - - cf. Torvoneustes
                  - - Torvoneustes sp.
                    - - Torvoneustes mexicanus
                      - - Torvoneustes jurensis
                        - Torvoneustes carpenteri
