= Marnes de Dives =

Geological formation in Normandy, France

- Stratigraphic range: Late Callovian
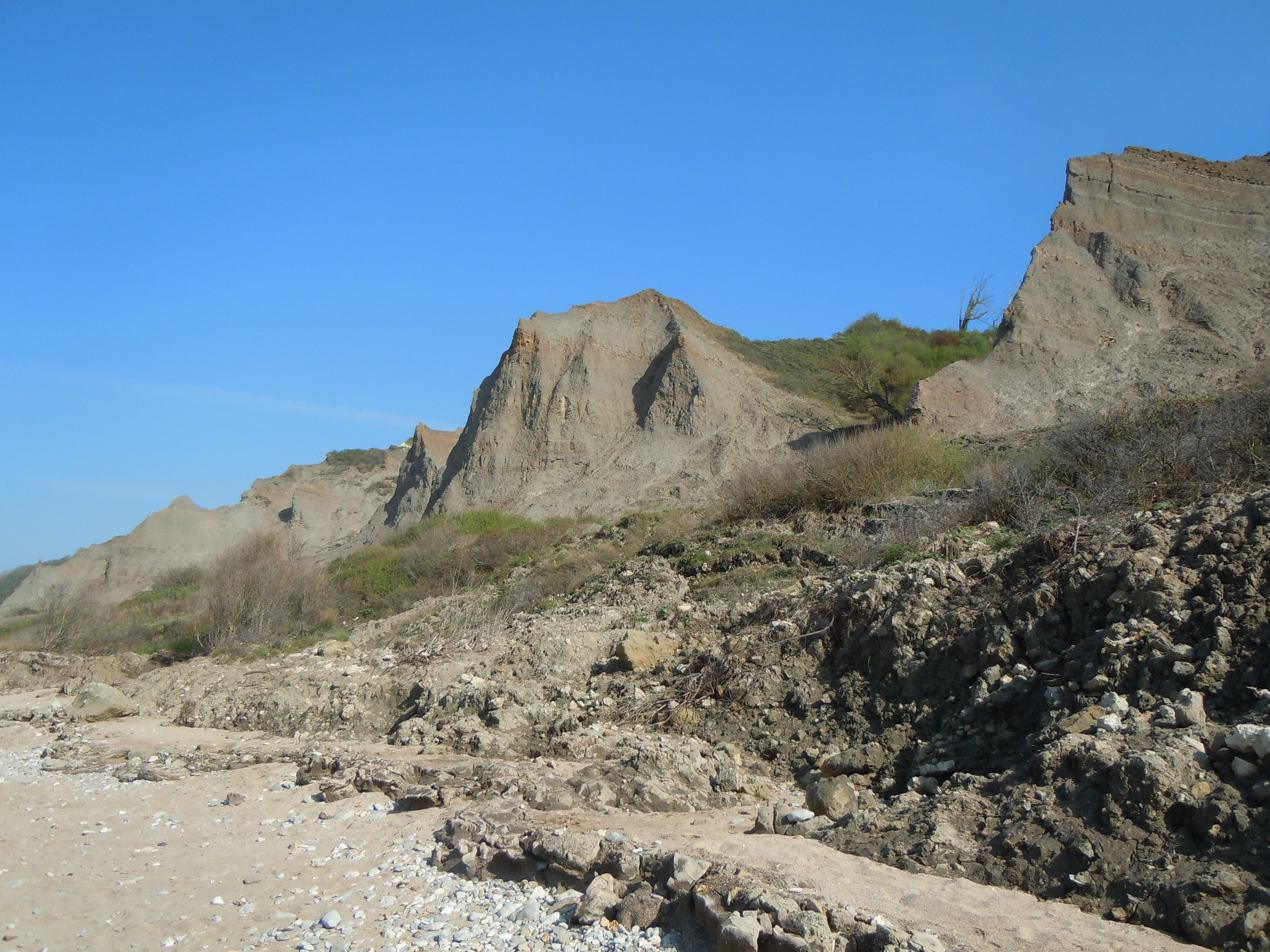
- Falaises des Vaches Noires
- Type: Geological formation
- Underlies: Marnes de Villers
- Thickness: 8–10 metres (30–30 ft)

Lithology
- Primary: Marl
- Other: Limestone

Location
- Region: Normandy
- Country: France
- Extent: Paris Basin

Type section
- Named for: Dives-sur-Mer

The Marnes de Dives is a geological formation in Normandy, France. It dates back to the upper part of the Callovian stage of the Middle Jurassic. And is partially equivalent to the Oxford Clay in England. It predominantly consists of ooidal marl, rich in pyrite and lignite, interbedded with thin limestone horizons. It is best exposed at the base of the Falaises des Vaches Noires (Cliffs of Black Cows) as well as the foreshore at low tide. It is known for its fossils, notably those of ammonites, marine crocodiles and fragmentary remains of dinosaurs, mostly theropods.

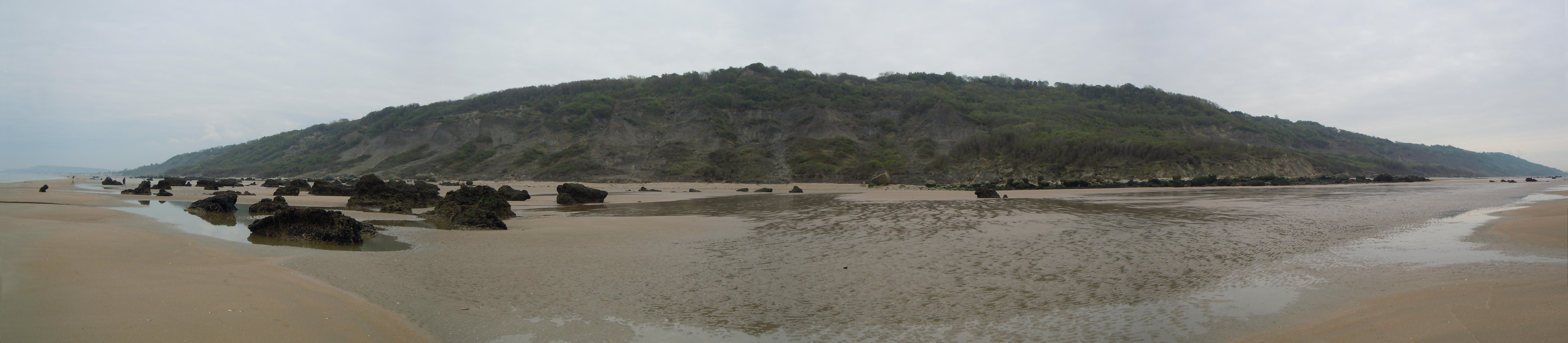
Panorama of the Falaises des Vaches Noires

== Vertebrate fauna ==
=== Dinosaurs ===
Dinosaurs of the Marnes de Dives
| Taxa | Species | Presence | Description | Images |
|---|---|---|---|---|
| Piveteausaurus | P. divesensis | Vaches Noires | Braincase. | |
| Streptospondylus | S. altdorfensis | Vaches Noires | Megalosaurid dinosaur. Originally a chimera of dinosaur and marine crocodile material. redefined to solely refer to the syntype dinosaur material consisting of "several vertebrae series, single vertebrae, a partial left pubis and limb elements". May be from the overlying Marnes de Villers, but the Marnes de Dives is much more productive and was better exposed when it was collected in the 18th century. | |
| Sauropoda | Indeterminate | Vaches Noires | Remains consist of a single vertebra, destroyed in 1944, may be from the overlying Marnes de Villers | |
| Stegosauria | Indeterminate | Vaches Noires | Remains consist of 2 associated vertebra in hard limestone | |
| Theropoda | Indeterminate | Vaches Noires | Multiple taxa represented, including indeterminate megalosaurid material possibly referrable to the two named taxa alongside fragmentary remains of Allosauroids, Including dentary and maxilla fragments. Other theropod remains include an associated braincase and frontal. Allosauroid material bears similarities to metriacanthosaurids. Material is of unclear stratigraphic provenance, and may belong to overlying cliff strata. | |

=== Crocodyliformes ===
| Crocodyliformes of the Marnes de Dives | | | | |
| Taxa | Species | Presence | Description | Images |
|---|---|---|---|---|
| Tyrannoneustes | T. lythrodectikos | Vaches Noires | A geosaurine metriorhynchid | |
| Metriorhynchus | M. geoffroyii | Vaches Noires | A metriorhynchine metriorhynchid | |
| Neosteneosaurus | N. edwardsi | Villers-sur-Mer | A machimosaurid thalattosuchian | |
| Proexochokefalos | P. heberti | Villers-sur-Mer | A machimosaurid thalattosuchian | |
| Suchodus | S. durobrivensis | Villers-sur-Mer | A geosaurine metriorhynchid | |
| Thalattosuchus | T. superciliosus | Villers-sur-Mer | A metriorhynchine metriorhynchid | |

=== Icthyosaurs ===
| Ichthyosaurs of the Marnes de Dives | | | | |
| Taxa | Species | Presence | Description | Images |
|---|---|---|---|---|
| Ophthalmosaurus | Indeterminate | Vaches Noires | A ophthalmosaurid ichthyosaur | |

=== Fish ===
Fish of the Marnes de Dives
| Taxa | Species | Presence | Description | Images |
|---|---|---|---|---|
| Leedsichthys | L. problematicus | Vaches Noires | A giant pachycormiform fish, may be from overlying Marnes de Villiers | |
| Trachymetopon | Indeterminate | Vaches Noires | A giant coelacanth | |
| cf. Hypsocormus | Indeterminate | Vaches Noires | A pachycormid fish | |
| Pycnodontiformes | Indeterminate | Vaches Noires | | |
| Lepidotidae | Indeterminate | Vaches Noires | A ginglymodian | |
| Ichthyodectiformes | Indeterminate | Vaches Noires | A stem-group teleost | |

== See also ==
- List of dinosaur-bearing rock formations
