= Sabinal Formation =

Geological formation in Oaxaca, Mexico

- Stratigraphic range: Kimmeridgian to Valanginian
- Type: sedimentary
- Unit of: Tlaxiaco Basin
- Underlies: Tlaxiaco Formation
- Overlies: Consuelo Group, Tecocoyuncan Group

Lithology
- Primary: Shale
- Other: Mudstone, wackestone, marl

Location
- Coordinates: 17.3°N 97.7°W
- Approximate paleocoordinates: 11.6°N 49.7°W
- Region: Oaxaca
- Country: Mexico
- Sabinal Formation (Mexico)

The Sabinal Formation is a Late Jurassic and Early Cretaceous-aged geological formation in Oaxaca, Mexico. It preserves a highly diverse marine fauna.

It was initially thought to only encompass the Late Jurassic (Kimmeridgian & Tithonian), but more recent studies have redefined it to cover the earliest Cretaceous (Berriasian & Valanginian) as well. It is part of the Tlaxiaco Basin, a prominent structural basin in southern Mexico that accumulated both continental and marine sediments between the Early Jurassic and the Paleogene. The most prolific site of the formation is the Kimmeridgian-aged Llano Yosobe site near Tlaxiaco.

== Vertebrate paleobiota ==
=== Cartilaginous fish ===
Cartilaginous fish of the Sabinal Formation
Genus	Species	Location	Stratigraphic position	Material	Notes	Images
Planohybodus	P. sp.	Yosobé	Kimmeridgian	Teeth	A hybodont.	

=== Ray-finned fish ===
Ray-finned fish of the Sabinal Formation'
Genus	Species	Location	Stratigraphic position	Material	Notes	Images
Belonostomus	B. ornatus	Cerro de la Virgen	Berriasian		An aspidorhynchid.	
Gyrodus	G. sp.	Yosobé	Kimmeridgian	Teeth, partial skeleton	A pycnodont. The most abundant vertebrate fossil in the formation.	
Nhanulepisosteus	N. mexicanus	Yosobé	Kimmeridgian	Partial cranium	A gar, the earliest known from the fossil record.	
Otomitla	O. mexicana	Cerro de la Virgen	Berriasian		An ichthyodectiform.	
Otomitla	O. speciosa	Cerro de la Virgen	Berriasian		An ichthyodectiform.	
Pleuropholidae indet.		Yosobé	Kimmeridgian	Trunk with scales	A pleuropholid.	
Pleuropholis	P. cisnerosorum	Yosobé	Kimmeridgian	Partial skull	A pleuropholid.	
?Thrissops	T. sp.	Cerro de la Virgen	Berriasian		An ichthyodectiform.	
Vinctifer	V. ferrusquiai	Yosobé	Kimmeridgian	Parts of head and trunk	An aspidorhynchid.	

=== Reptiles ===
==== Crocodylomorphs ====
Crocodylomorphs of the Sabinal Formation
Genus	Species	Location	Stratigraphic position	Material	Notes	Images
Maledictosuchus	M. nuyivijanan	Yosobé	Kimmeridgian	Nearly complete cranium, jaws, and some vertebrae	A metriorhynchid thalattosuchian. First record of this genus outside Europe.	
Torvoneustes	T. mexicanus (=Plesiosaurus mexicanus, Cricosaurus mexicanus)	Unknown, but most likely Yosobé	Kimmeridgian	Parts of cranium and jaws	A metriorhynchid thalattosuchian. First record of this genus outside Europe.	

==== Turtles ====
Turtles of the Sabinal Formation
Genus	Species	Location	Stratigraphic position	Material	Notes	Images
Notoemys	N. tlaxiacoensis	Yosobé	Kimmeridgian	Nearly complete carapace with plastron	A stem-group sideneck turtle.	

==== Plesiosaurs ====
Plesiosaurs of the Sabinal Formation
Genus	Species	Location	Stratigraphic position	Material	Notes	Images
Liopleurodon	L. sp.	Yosobé	Kimmeridgian	Partial jaw with teeth	A pliosaur. First record of this genus outside Europe.	
Pliosauridae indet.		Yosobé	Kimmeridgian	Vertebrae and ribs	An indeterminate pliosaur. Remains appear to have been scavenged by Planohybodus.	

==== Ichthyosauria ====
Ichthyosaurs of the Sabinal Formation
Genus	Species	Location	Stratigraphic position	Material	Notes	Images
Ophthalmosauridae indet.		Yosobé	Kimmeridgian	Vertebrae	An ophthalmosaurid ichthyosaur.	
