= Rhacheosaurus =

Rhacheosaurus Temporal range: Late Jurassic, 151 Ma
- Skeletal reconstruction
- Fossil specimen at the Field Museum of Natural History

Scientific classification
- Kingdom: Animalia
- Phylum: Chordata
- Class: Reptilia
- Clade: Pseudosuchia
- Clade: Crocodylomorpha
- Suborder: †Thalattosuchia
- Family: †Metriorhynchidae
- Tribe: †Rhacheosaurini
- Genus: †Rhacheosaurus; Meyer, 1831
- Species: †R. gracilis

Binomial name
- †Rhacheosaurus gracilis von Meyer, 1831

Extinct genus of reptiles

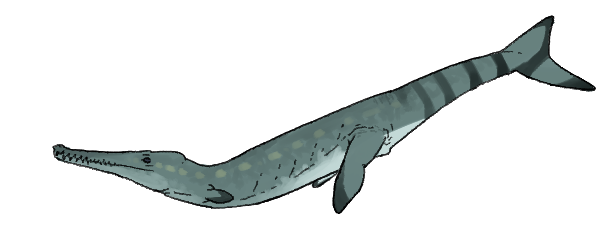

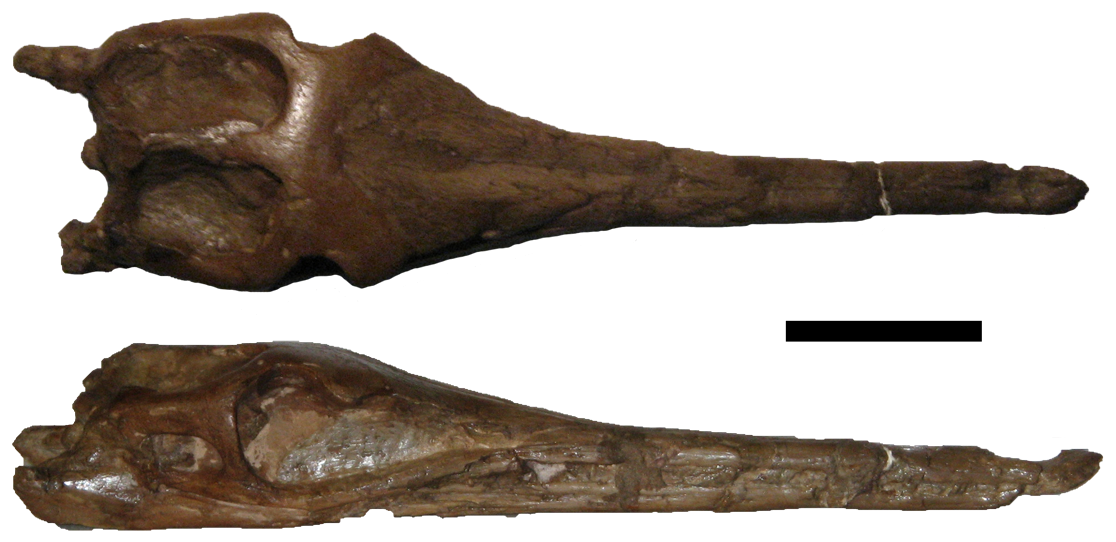
Referred specimen

Rhacheosaurus is an extinct genus of small marine crocodyliform belonging to the family Metriorhynchidae. The genus was established by Christian Erich Hermann von Meyer in 1831 for skeletal remains from the Tithonian (Late Jurassic) of Germany. The holotype consists of a partial posterior skeleton that was subsequently lost. A small (1.14 m (3.7 ft)), complete skeleton with extensive soft-tissue impressions (likely of a juvenile individual) has been referred to the taxon, and has recently served as a basis of comparison for the clade rhacheosaurinae.

== History and classification ==
A phylogenetic analysis in 2009 showed that several long-snouted species formerly classified in the related genera Geosaurus, Enaliosuchus, and Metriorhynchus were in fact more closely related to the original specimens of Cricosaurus, and thus were re-classified into this genus. This analysis also resurrected the generic name Rhacheosaurus.

The cladogram below is from an analysis by Mark Young and colleagues in 2020.

- Metriorhynchinae
  - Thalattosuchus superciliosus
  - - - Gracilineustes acutus
      - Gracilineustes leedsi
    - - - Maledictosuchus nuyivijanan
        - Maledictosuchus riclaensis
      - - Metriorhynchus brevirostris
        - Rhacheosaurini
          - - "Metriorhynchus" palpebrosus
            - - "Cricosaurus" saltillensis
              - - Swiss rhacheosaurin
                - Cretaceous rhacheosaurin
          - - Metriorhynchinae indet. (Cuba)
            - - - Rhacheosaurus gracilis
                - cf. Cricosaurus
              - Cricosaurus
                - - Cricosaurus bambergensis
                  - - Solnhofen Cricosaurus
                    - - Cricosaurus elegans
                      - Cricosaurus suevicus
                - - Cricosaurus lithographicus
                  - - Cricosaurus araucanensis
                    - - Cricosaurus vignaudi
                      - Cricosaurus schroederi

== Niche partitioning ==
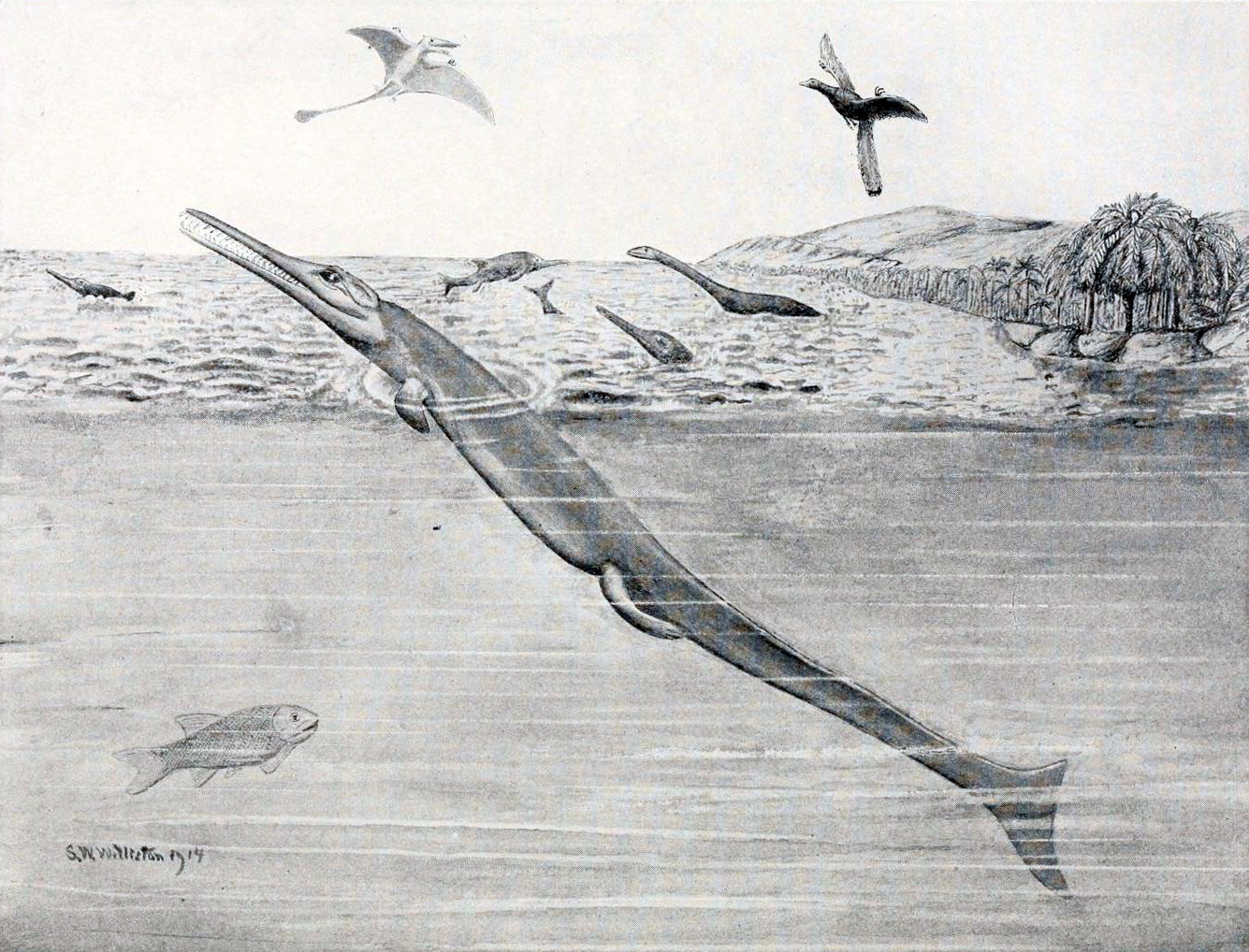
Historical reconstruction by Williston, 1914

Several species of metriorhynchids are known from the Mörnsheim Formation (Solnhofen limestone, early Tithonian) of Bavaria, Germany: Rhacheosaurus gracilis, Dakosaurus maximus, Geosaurus giganteus and Cricosaurus suevicus. It has been hypothesised that niche partitioning enabled several species of crocodyliforms to co-exist. The top predators of this Formation appear to be D. maximus and G. giganteus, which were large, short-snouted species with serrated teeth. The long-snouted C. suevicus and R. gracilis would have fed mostly on fish, although the more lightly built Rhacheosaurus may have specialised towards feeding on small prey. In addition to these four species of metriorhynchids, a moderate-sized species of Steneosaurus was also contemporaneous.
