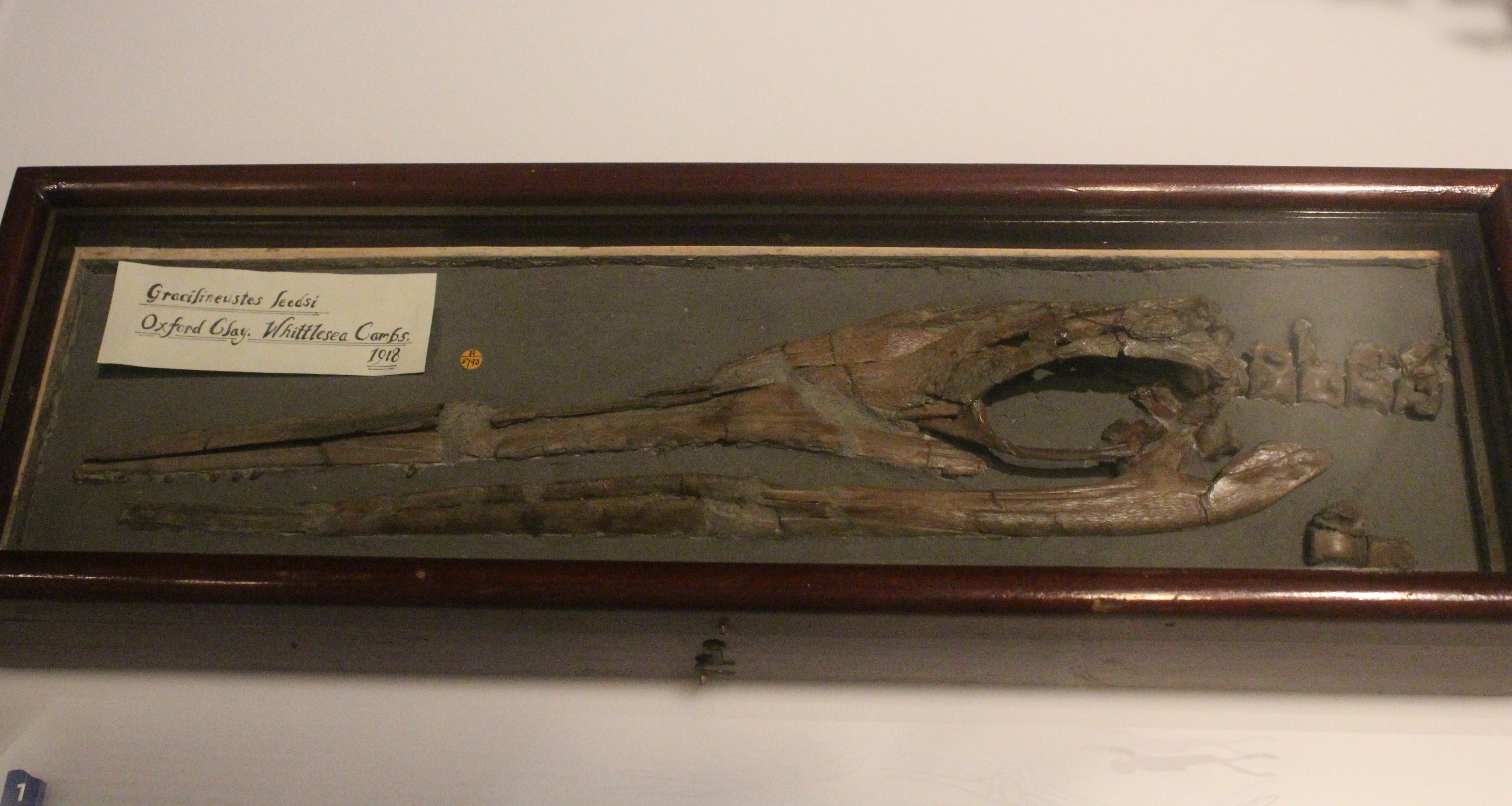
- Fossil skull of G. leedsi, NHMUK PV R5793, at the Field Museum of Natural History

Scientific classification
- Kingdom: Animalia
- Phylum: Chordata
- Class: Reptilia
- Clade: Pseudosuchia
- Clade: Crocodylomorpha
- Suborder: †Thalattosuchia
- Family: †Metriorhynchidae
- Subfamily: †Metriorhynchinae
- Genus: †Gracilineustes; Young et al., 2010

Type species
- †Gracilineustes leedsi (Andrews, 1913)

Other species
- †G. acutus Lennier, 1887

Synonyms
- Metriorhynchus laeve Andrews, 1913

= Gracilineustes =

Gracilineustes Temporal range: Callovian - Kimmeridgian, 167–155 Ma

Extinct genus of reptiles

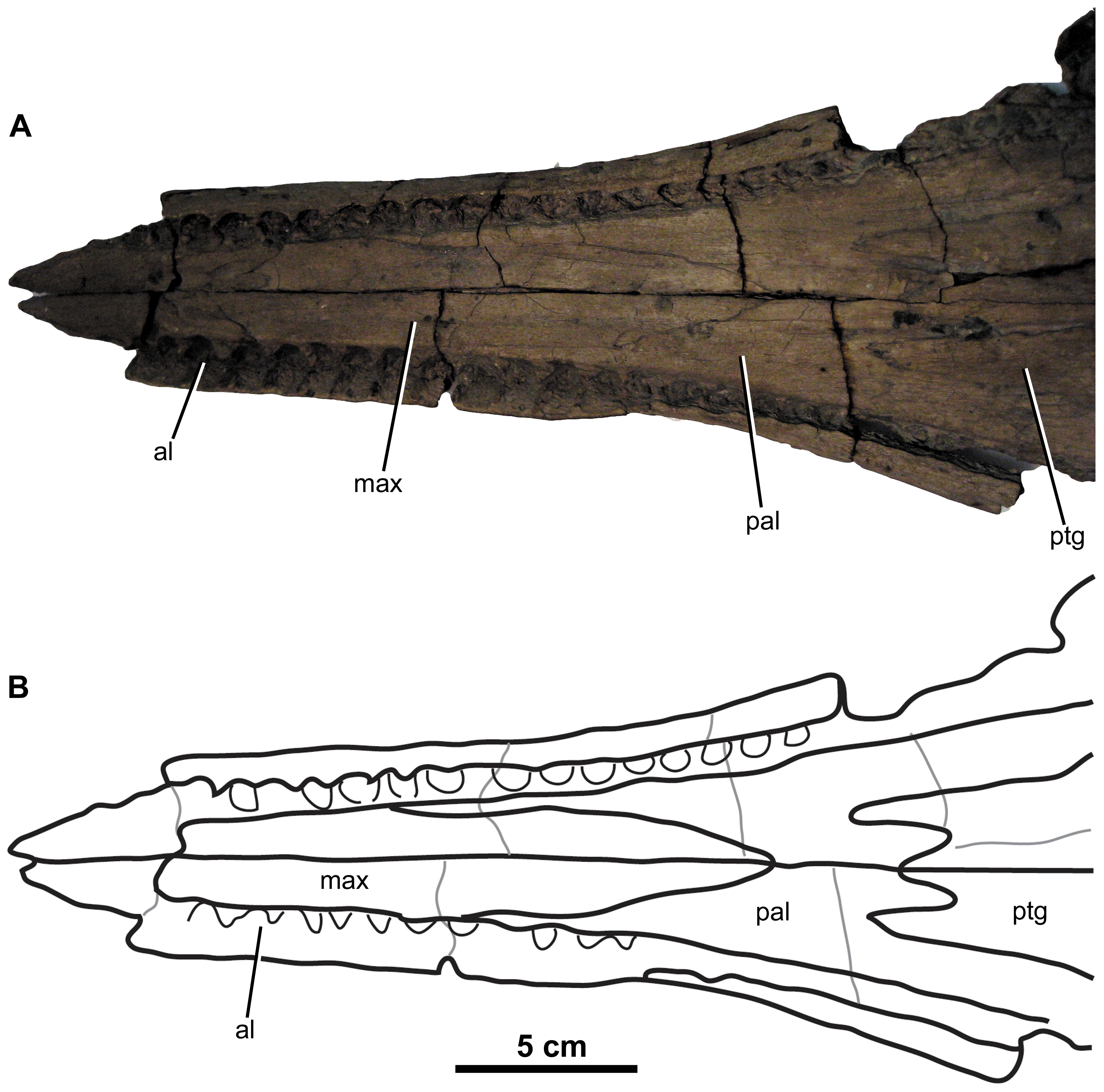
Holotype of G. leedsi, NHMUK PV R3540

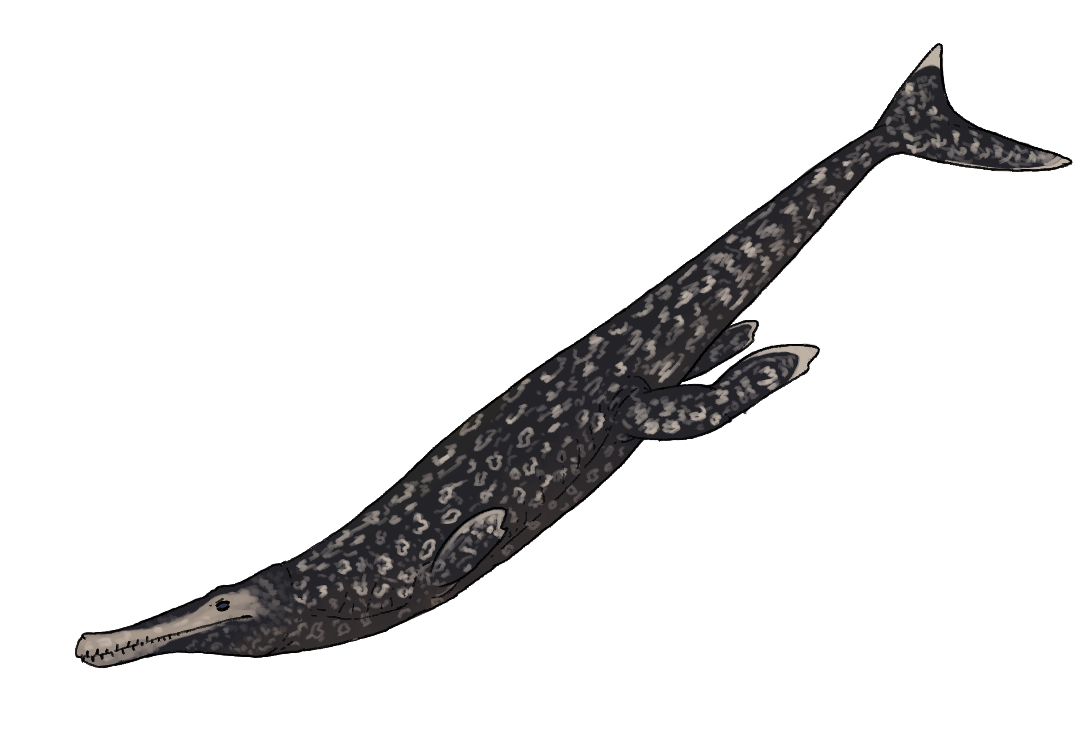

Gracilineustes is an extinct genus of marine crocodyliform that lived in the oceans during the Middle to Late Jurassic. Gracilineustes was a carnivore that spent much, if not all, its life out at sea. It was a small reptile, with G. leedsi measuring 2.25–3.11 m (7.4–10.2 ft) long and G. acutus measuring 3.77 m (12.4 ft) long.

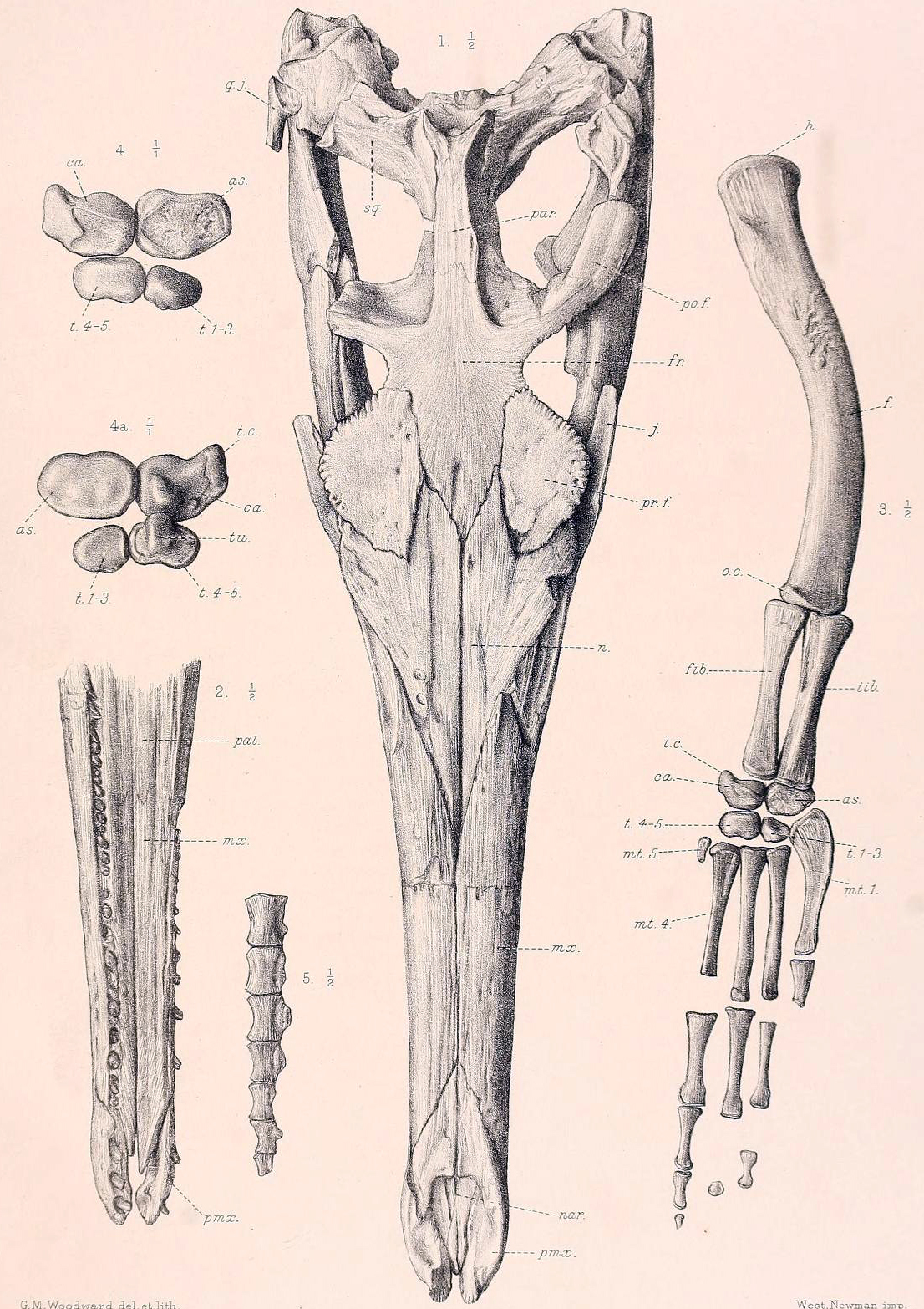
Skull and limb of G. leedsi

== Discovery and species ==
Fossil specimens referrable to Gracilineustes are known from Middle-Late Jurassic deposits of England and France.

=== Valid species ===
- G. leedsi: Western Europe (England) of the Middle Jurassic (Callovian); Metriorhynchus laeve is a junior synonym.
- G. acutus: Western Europe (France) of the Late Jurassic (Kimmeridgian)

== Classification ==
Gracilineustes is an early member of the metriorhynchid subfamily Metriorhynchinae. The cladogram below is from an analysis by Mark Young and colleagues in 2020.

- Metriorhynchinae
  - Thalattosuchus superciliosus
  - - - Gracilineustes acutus
      - Gracilineustes leedsi
    - - - Maledictosuchus nuyivijanan
        - Maledictosuchus riclaensis
      - - Metriorhynchus brevirostris
        - Rhacheosaurini
          - - "Metriorhynchus" palpebrosus
            - - "Cricosaurus" saltillensis
              - - Swiss rhacheosaurin
                - Cretaceous rhacheosaurin
          - - Metriorhynchinae indet. (Cuba)
            - - - Rhacheosaurus gracilis
                - cf. Cricosaurus
              - Cricosaurus
                - - Cricosaurus bambergensis
                  - - Solnhofen Cricosaurus
                    - - Cricosaurus elegans
                      - Cricosaurus suevicus
                - - Cricosaurus lithographicus
                  - - Cricosaurus araucanensis
                    - - Cricosaurus vignaudi
                      - Cricosaurus schroederi
