= Marnes de Villers =

Geological formation in Normandy, France

- Stratigraphic range: Early Oxfordian
- Type: Formation
- Underlies: Oolithes ferrugineuses de Villers
- Overlies: Marnes de Dives
- Thickness: 25 to 27 metres

Lithology
- Primary: Marl
- Other: Limestone

Location
- Region: Normandy
- Country: France

The Marnes de Villers is a geologic formation in France. It preserves fossils dating back to the Late Jurassic period.

== Paleofauna ==
- Allosauroidea indet. - possible metriacanthosaurid
- Leedsichthys
- Megalosauridae indet. - Similar to Torvosaurus
- ?Streptospondylus - tentative referral based on similarities with Eustreptospondylus (may not be from the formation)

== See also ==
- List of fossiliferous stratigraphic units in France
