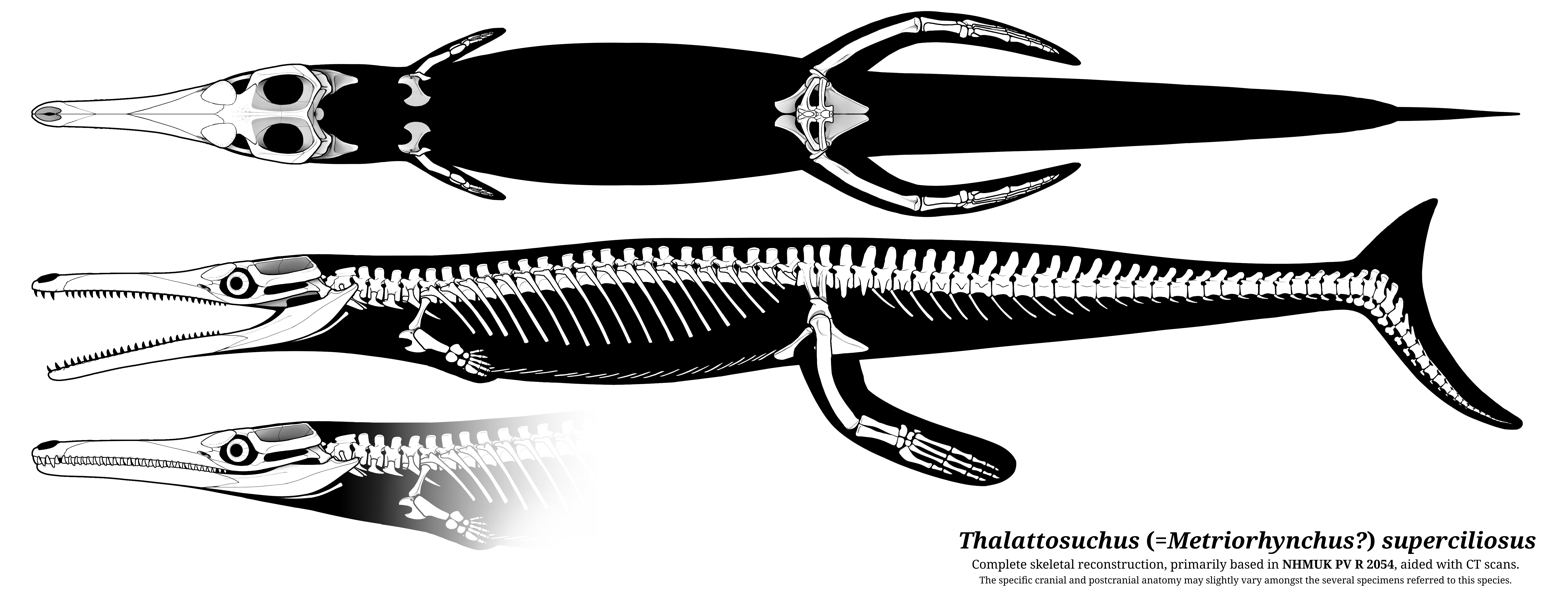
- Skeletal reconstruction
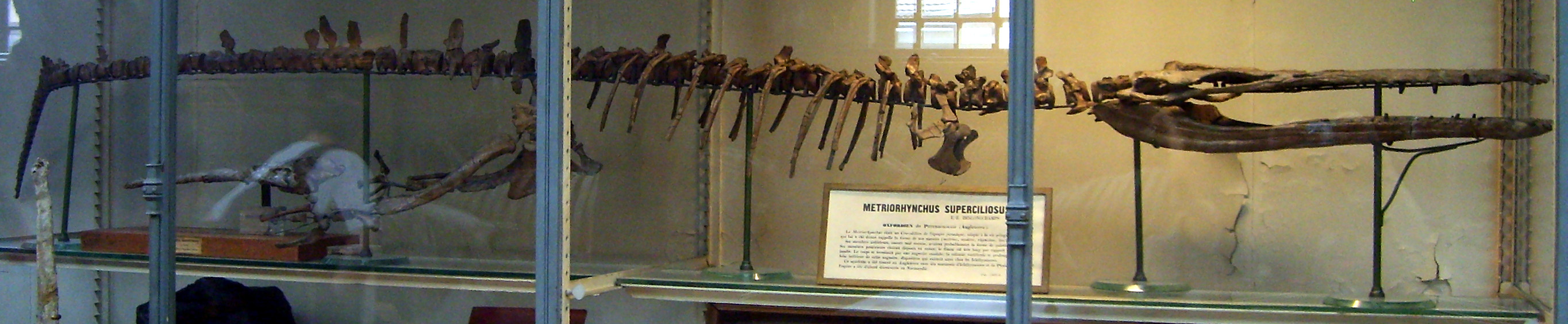
- Partial T. superciliosus at the Muséum national d'Histoire naturelle, Paris. The skull is flattened.

Scientific classification
- Kingdom: Animalia
- Phylum: Chordata
- Class: Reptilia
- Clade: Pseudosuchia
- Clade: Crocodylomorpha
- Suborder: †Thalattosuchia
- Family: †Metriorhynchidae
- Subfamily: †Metriorhynchinae
- Genus: †Thalattosuchus; Young et al., 2020
- Species: †T. superciliosus

Binomial name
- †Thalattosuchus superciliosus (Blainville in Eudes-Deslongchamps, 1852)

Synonyms
- Crocodilus supercilious de Blainville in Eudes-Deslongchamps, 1852; Metriorhynchus jaekli Schmidt, 1904; Teleosaurus superciliosus (de Blainville, 1852) Eudes-Deslongchamps, 1867; Metriorhynchus superciliosus (de Blainville, 1852) Eudes-Deslongchamps, 1869; Steneosaurus dasyceps Seeley, 1869

= Thalattosuchus =

Thalattosuchus Temporal range: Callovian - Oxfordian, 166–160 Ma

Extinct genus of reptiles

Thalattosuchus (from Ancient Greek θᾰ́λᾰττᾰ (thálatta), meaning "sea", and σούχος (soúkhos), meaning "crocodile") is an extinct genus of marine crocodyliform that lived in the oceans during the Middle to Late Jurassic. Though the genus Thalattosuchus itself was named in 2020, its fossils have historically been included under the well known name Metriorhynchus as the species M. superciliosus, from which much of the research on the latter genus has been based upon. M. superciliosus was named as its own genus after a team of palaeontologists led by Mark Young in 2020 argued that the name Metriorhynchus could only be definitively applied to the type species, M. geoffroyii, and named Thalattosuchus ("sea crocodile", and from its parent group Thalattosuchia). Not all researchers have accepted this split, and in 2022 another team led by Jonas le Mort have proposed Thalattosuchus be syonymised back into Metriorhynchus. Along a team led by Stéphane Hua in 2026.

Thalattosuchus was a carnivore that spent much, if not all, its life out at sea. No Thalattosuchus eggs or nests have been discovered, so little is known of the reptile's life cycle, unlike other large marine reptiles of the Mesozoic, such as plesiosaurs or ichthyosaurs which are known to have given birth to live young out at sea. Where Thalattosuchus mated, whether on land or at sea, is currently unknown.

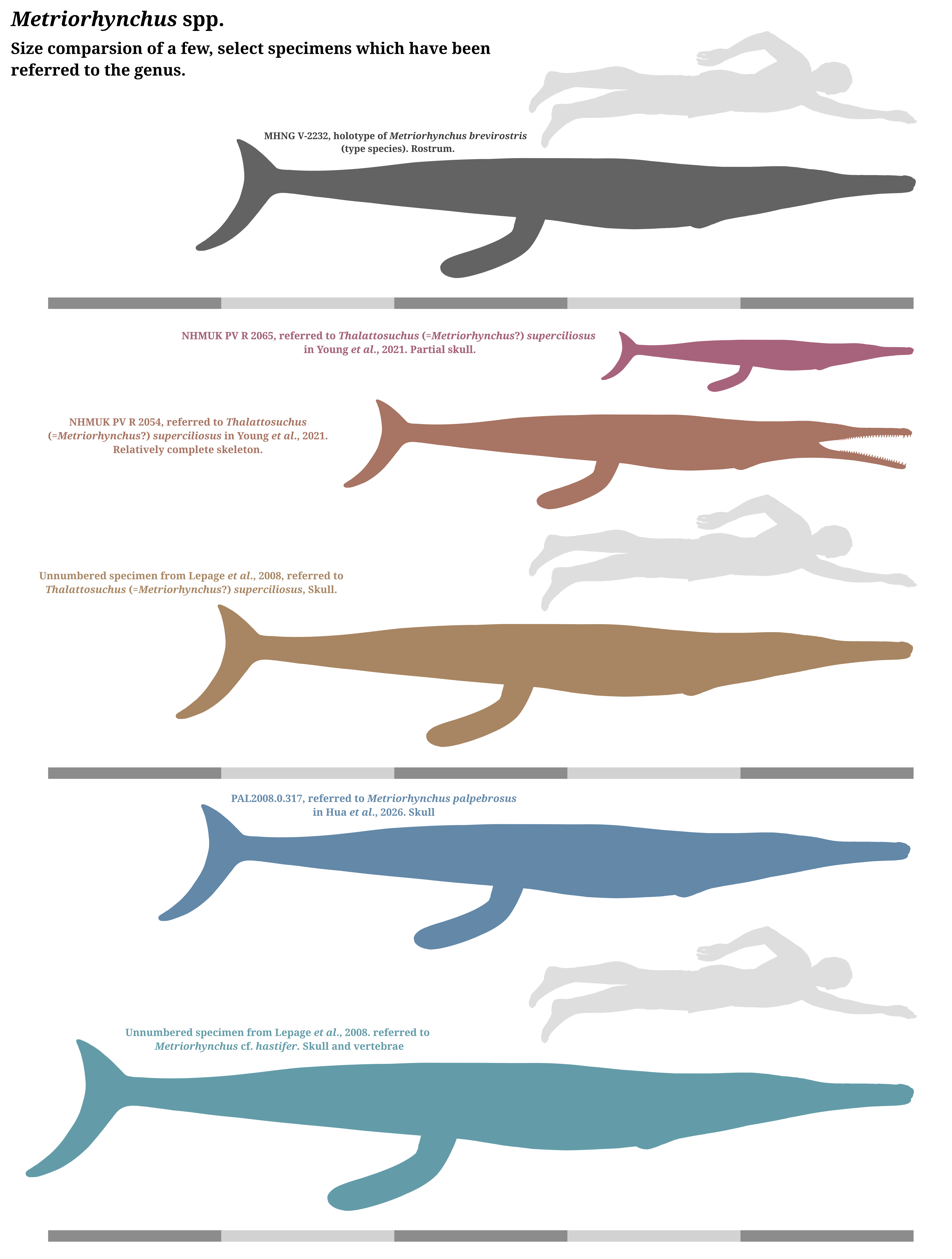
Size comparison of Metriorhynchus brevirostris (top), and other specimens which have been previously assigned to the genus

== Discovery and species ==
Fossil specimens referrable to Thalattosuchus are known from Middle-Late Jurassic deposits of England, France and Germany.

The type species of Thalattosuchus was initially described as Crocodilus superciliosus in 1852. During the 1860s the species superciliosus was moved to the genera Teleosaurus and Metriorhynchus. The type specimen of superciliosus was largely neglected in the literature, and was figured in 2018 and figured again in 2020 when the genus Thalattosuchus was created for the species.

Only one species is recognised, the type species T. superciliosus.

The cladogram below is from an analysis by Mark Young and colleagues in 2020.

- Metriorhynchinae
  - Thalattosuchus superciliosus
  - - - Gracilineustes acutus
      - Gracilineustes leedsi
    - - - Maledictosuchus nuyivijanan
        - Maledictosuchus riclaensis
      - - Metriorhynchus brevirostris
        - Rhacheosaurini
          - - "Metriorhynchus" palpebrosus
            - - "Cricosaurus" saltillensis
              - - Swiss rhacheosaurin
                - Cretaceous rhacheosaurin
          - - Metriorhynchinae indet. (Cuba)
            - - - Rhacheosaurus gracilis
                - cf. Cricosaurus
              - Cricosaurus
                - - Cricosaurus bambergensis
                  - - Solnhofen Cricosaurus
                    - - Cricosaurus elegans
                      - Cricosaurus suevicus
                - - Cricosaurus lithographicus
                  - - Cricosaurus araucanensis
                    - - Cricosaurus vignaudi
                      - Cricosaurus schroederi

== Description ==
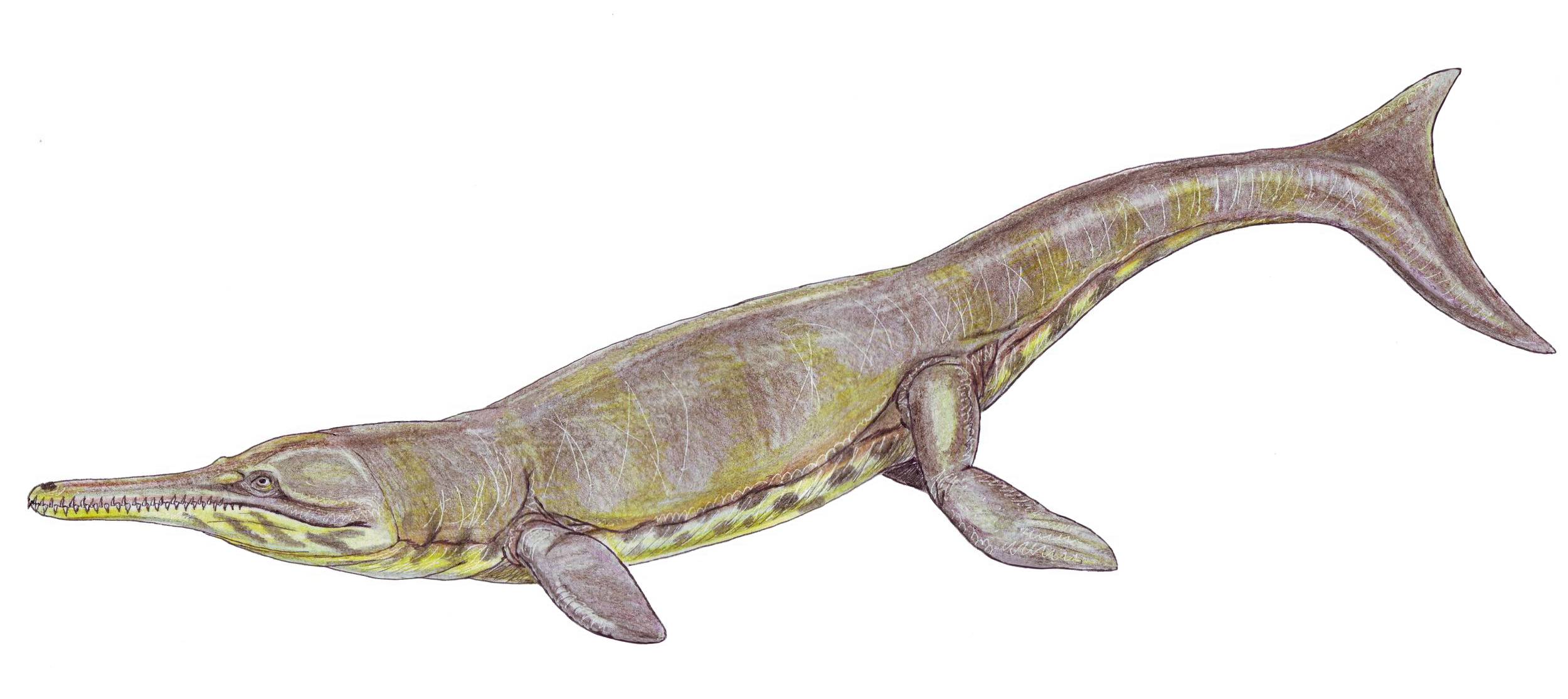
Life restoration of T. superciliosus

Measuring 3–4.5 m (10–15 ft) in length, Thalattosuchus was similar in size to modern crocodiles. However, it had a streamlined body and a finned tail, making it a more efficient swimmer than modern crocodylian species.

== Palaeobiology ==
=== Salt glands ===
Thalattosuchus had nasal salt glands which, like the salt glands of all other marine reptiles, were used to remove excess salt. This means that like Cricosaurus it would have been able to "drink" salt-water and eat equally salty prey, such as cephalopods, without dehydrating.

== See also ==
- List of marine reptiles
