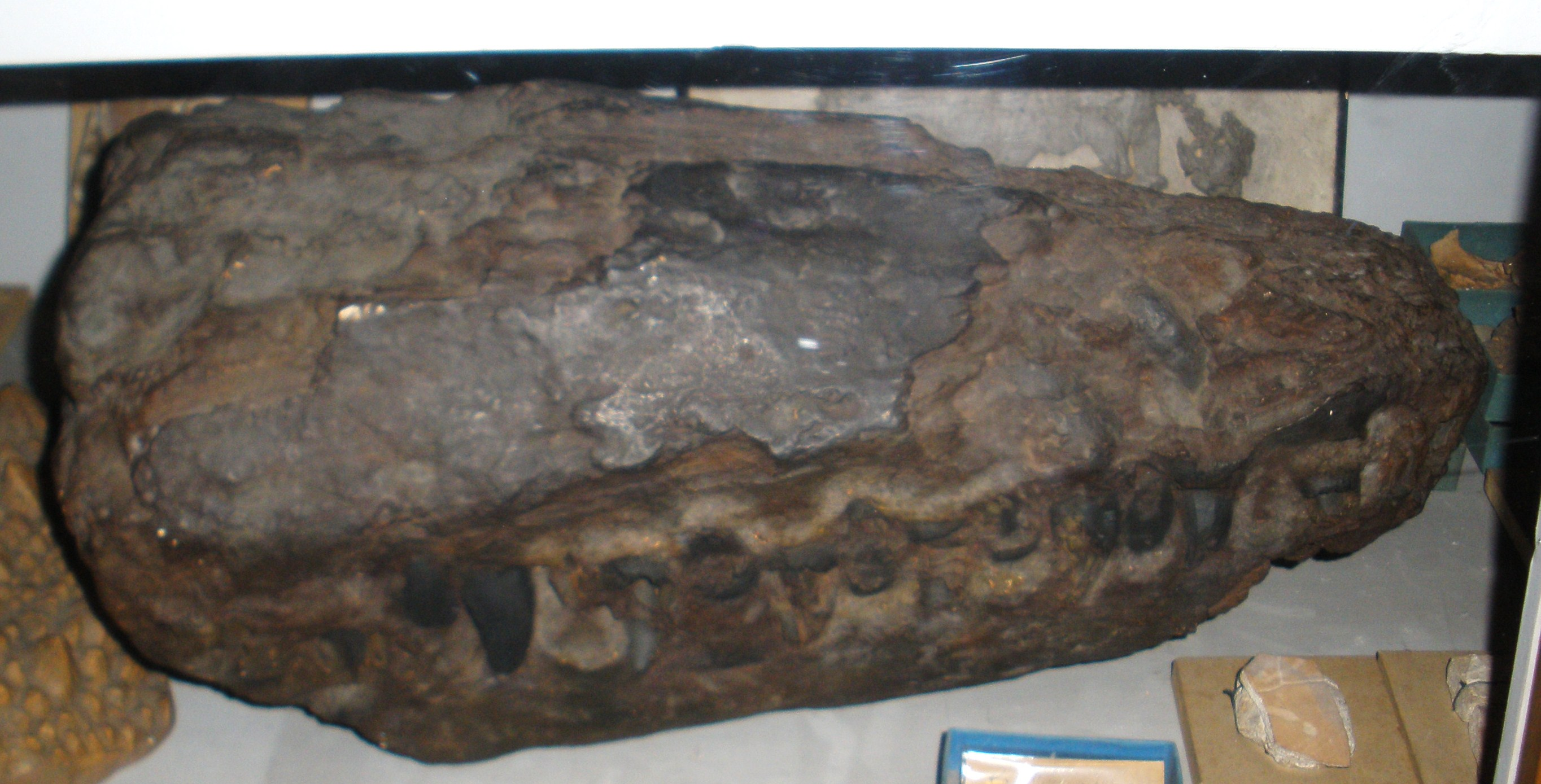
- Specimen in Museo Capellini di Bologna

Scientific classification
- Domain: Eukaryota
- Kingdom: Animalia
- Phylum: Chordata
- Class: Reptilia
- Order: Squamata
- Clade: †Mosasauria
- Family: †Mosasauridae
- Subfamily: †Mosasaurinae
- Genus: †Capelliniosuchus

Species
- C. mutinensis

= Capelliniosuchus =

Capelliniosuchus Temporal range: Late Cretaceous

Extinct genus of lizards

Capelliniosuchus is an extinct genus of mosasaur. It was discovered in Italy, and described by Simonelli, originally believing it to be a metriorhynchid crocodyliform similar to Dakosaurus. However, after re-examining the type specimen, Sirotti concluded that it was a junior synonym of Mosasaurus hoffmannii. A 2014 paper found the genus to be distinct from M. hoffmannii.

Capellineosuchus is a misspelling by Romer.
