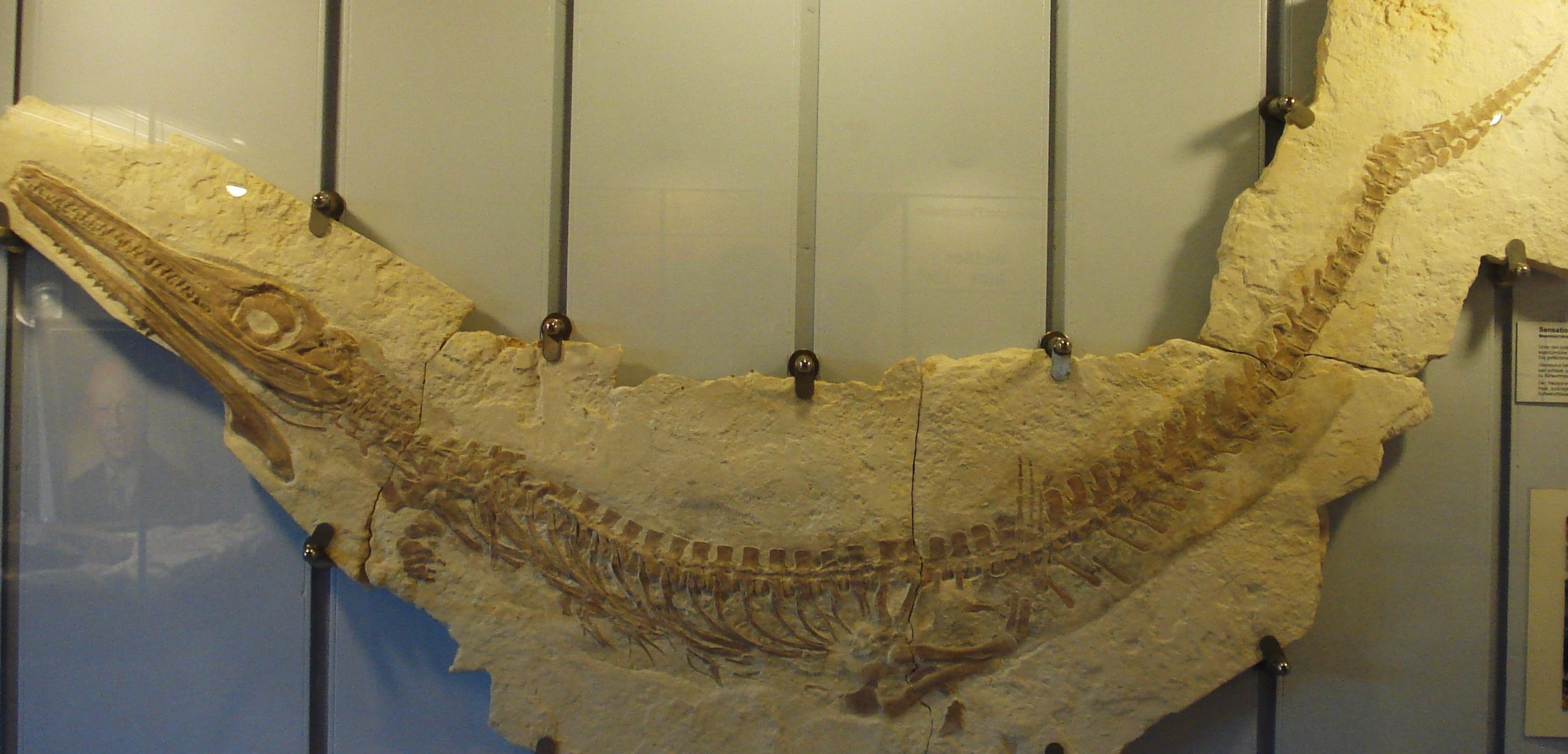
- Fossil of Cricosaurus albersdoerferi, Museum Eichstaett
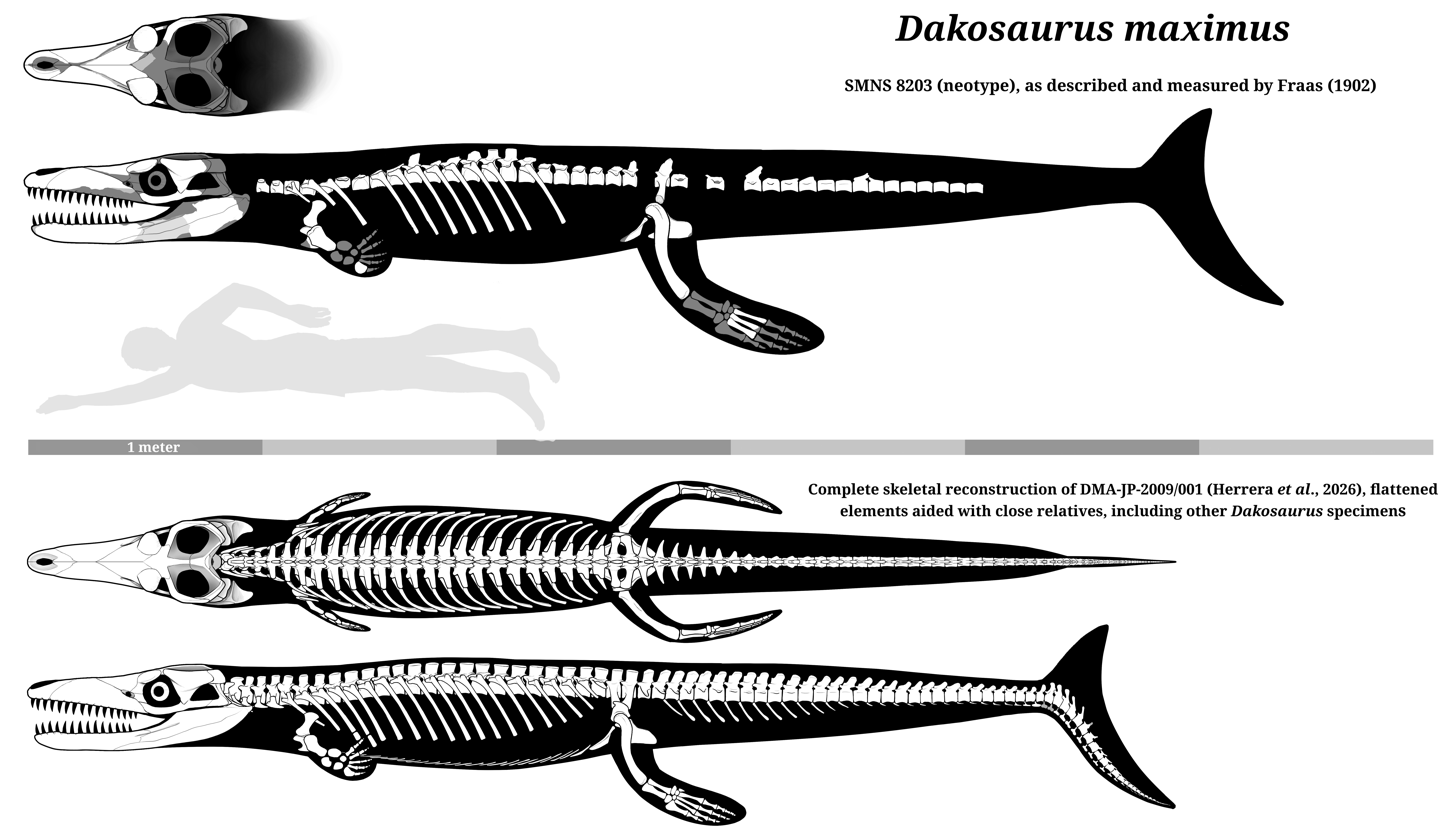
- Skeletal reconstruction and size comparison of Dakosaurus maximus

Scientific classification
- Kingdom: Animalia
- Phylum: Chordata
- Class: Reptilia
- Clade: Pseudosuchia
- Clade: Crocodylomorpha
- Suborder: †Thalattosuchia
- Clade: †Euthalattosuchia
- Family: †Metriorhynchidae; Fitzinger, 1843

Genera
- †Enaliosuchus; †Neustosaurus; †Metriorhynchinae Lydekker, 1888; †Enalioetes; †Gracilineustes; †Metriorhynchus; †Thalattosuchus; †Rhacheosaurini Young et al., 2011; †Cricosaurus; †Maledictosuchus; †Rhacheosaurus; †Geosaurinae Bonaparte, 1845; †Neptunidraco; †Geosaurini Bonaparte, 1845; †Aggiosaurus; †Dakosaurus; †Purranisaurus; †Torvoneustes; †Tyrannoneustes; †Geosaurina Bonaparte, 1845; †Geosaurus; †Ieldraan; †Plesiosuchina Young et al., 2014; †Plesiosuchus; †Suchodus

Synonyms
- Geosauridae Andrews, 1913

= Metriorhynchidae =

Metriorhynchids Temporal range: Middle Jurassic-Early Cretaceous, 168–125 Ma

Extinct family of reptiles

Metriorhynchidae is an extinct family of specialized, aquatic metriorhynchoid crocodyliforms from the Middle Jurassic to the Early Cretaceous period (Bajocian to early Aptian) of Europe, North America and South America. The name Metriorhynchidae was coined by the Austrian zoologist Leopold Fitzinger in 1843. The group contains two subfamilies, the Metriorhynchinae and the Geosaurinae. They represent the most marine adapted of all archosaurs.

== Description ==
Metriorhynchids are fully aquatic crocodyliforms. Their forelimbs were small and paddle-like, and unlike living crocodylians, they lost their osteoderms ("armour scutes"). Their body shape maximised hydrodynamy (swimming efficiency), as they did have a shark-like tail fluke. Like ichthyosaurs and plesiosaurs, metriorhynchids developed smooth, scaleless skin. However, unlike those marine reptiles, they were poikilothermic with little to no endothermic ability.

Metriorhynchids were the only group of archosaurs to become fully adapted to the marine realm, becoming pelagic in lifestyle. With tail flukes, reduced limb musculature, and long bones histologically comparable to other obligately aquatic animals, they were almost certainly incapable of terrestrial locomotion; combined with an unusually tall hip opening, as also seen in other obligately aquatic reptiles including the viviparous Keichousaurus, these characters suggest that metriorhynchids gave live birth. A fossil of a pregnant Dakosaurus female recovered from the Late Jurassic plattenkalk, Bavaria, preserves the complete skeleton of a neonate with small, paddle-like forelimbs unsuited for walking on land, similar to those of adults, further supporting live birth in metriorhynchids. Recent research posits that despite their successful adaptation to a pelagic lifestyle, basal metriorhynchids were uniquely disadvantaged among aquatic tetrapods in evolving into sustained swimmers due to little to no posterodorsal retraction of the external nares (unlike other reptilian groups such as mesosaurs, phytosaurs, thalattosaurians, saurosphargids, ichthyosauriforms, sauropterygians, pleurosaurids or mosasauroids, as well as mammalian cetaceans or sirenians). The family has a wide geographic distribution, with material found in Argentina, Chile, Cuba, England, France, Germany, Italy, Mexico, Poland, Russia, Switzerland and Czech Republic.

== Classification ==
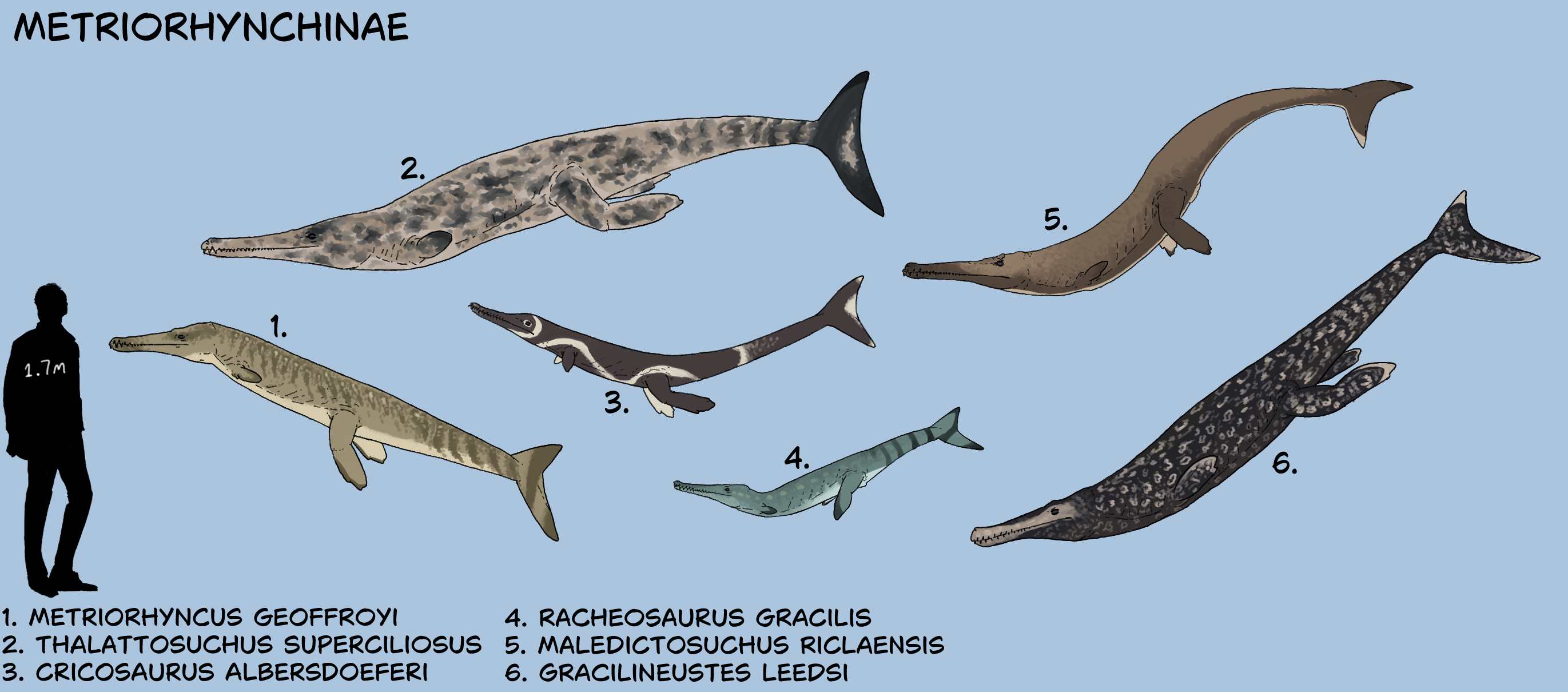
Life restoration of members of the Metriorhynchinae compared to a human

Phylogenetic analyses published during the 2000s cast doubt on the idea that many traditional metriorhynchid genera formed natural groups (i.e., include all descendants of a common ancestor). The traditional species of Geosaurus, Dakosaurus and Cricosaurus were found to represent unnatural groups, and the species traditionally classified in these genera were reshuffled in a study published in November 2009 by Mark T. Young and Marco Brandalise de Andrade. The monophyly of Metriorhynchus and Teleidosaurus is also unsupported, and the species of these genera are pending reclassification.

The classification presented by Young and Andrade in 2009 was approved in later studies of the Metriorhynchidae. Metriorhynchidae is a node-based taxon defined in the PhyloCode by Mark T. Young and colleagues in 2024 as "the smallest clade within Metriorhynchoidea containing Thalattosuchus superciliosus, Gracilineustes leedsi, Metriorhynchus brevirostris, Rhacheosaurus gracilis, and Geosaurus giganteus" The cladogram below follows the topology from the 2020 analyses by Young et al. and reduced to genera only.

- Metriorhynchidae
  - Metriorhynchinae
    - Thalattosuchus
    - - Gracilineustes
      - - Maledictosuchus
        - - Metriorhynchus
          - Rhacheosaurini
            - Cricosaurus
            - Rhacheosaurus
  - Geosaurinae
    - Neptunidraco
    - - Geosaurini
        - - Tyrannoneustes
          - - Torvoneustes
            - 'E-clade'
            - Purranisaurus
        - - - Ieldraan
            - Geosaurus
          - - Dakosaurus
            - - Plesiosuchus
              - Suchodus

=== List of genera ===
The type genus of the family Metriorhynchidae is Metriorhynchus from the Middle to Late Jurassic. Other genera included within this family are Cricosaurus, Geosaurus, and Dakosaurus. Though once considered a metriorhynchid, Teleidosaurus has since been found to be slightly more distantly related to these animals within the superfamily Metriorhynchoidea.

Within this family, the genus Neustosaurus and Enaliosuchus are considered nomen dubium ("doubtful name").

The genus Capelliniosuchus was once thought to be a metriorhynchid similar to Dakosaurus. However, it was later found to be a mosasaur.

| Genus | Status | Author | Age | Location | Description | Synonyms | Images |
|---|---|---|---|---|---|---|---|
| Aggiosaurus | | Ambayrac, 1913 | late Oxfordian | France. | Sometimes considered to be a nomen dubium. | | Cricosaurus suevicus Dakosaurus andiniensis Thalattosuchus superciliosus Neptunidraco ammoniticus 'Metriorhynchus' casamiquelai Suchodus durobrivensis |
| Cricosaurus | Valid | Wagner, 1858 | middle Oxfordian to upper Valanginian | Argentina, Chile, Cuba, England, France, Germany, Mexico, Russia and Switzerland. | | | Cricosaurus suevicus Dakosaurus andiniensis Thalattosuchus superciliosus Neptunidraco ammoniticus 'Metriorhynchus' casamiquelai Suchodus durobrivensis |
| Dakosaurus | Valid | von Quenstedt, 1856 | upper Kimmeridgian to lower Berriasian | Argentina, England, France, Germany, Mexico, Poland, Switzerland and possibly Russia. | | Dacosaurus (lapsus calami) | Cricosaurus suevicus Dakosaurus andiniensis Thalattosuchus superciliosus Neptunidraco ammoniticus 'Metriorhynchus' casamiquelai Suchodus durobrivensis |
| Enaliosuchus | nomen dubium | Koken, 1883 | Valanginian | Germany. | | | Cricosaurus suevicus Dakosaurus andiniensis Thalattosuchus superciliosus Neptunidraco ammoniticus 'Metriorhynchus' casamiquelai Suchodus durobrivensis |
| Geosaurus | Valid | Cuvier, 1824 | upper Kimmeridgian to upper Valanginian | France, Germany, Italy and Switzerland. | | Brachytaenius; Halilimnosaurus | Cricosaurus suevicus Dakosaurus andiniensis Thalattosuchus superciliosus Neptunidraco ammoniticus 'Metriorhynchus' casamiquelai Suchodus durobrivensis |
| Gracilineustes | Valid | Young et al., 2010 | middle Callovian to lower Kimmeridgian | England and France. | | | Cricosaurus suevicus Dakosaurus andiniensis Thalattosuchus superciliosus Neptunidraco ammoniticus 'Metriorhynchus' casamiquelai Suchodus durobrivensis |
| Maledictosuchus | Valid | Parrilla-Bel et al., 2013 | middle Callovian to Kimmeridgian | Spain and Mexico. | | | Cricosaurus suevicus Dakosaurus andiniensis Thalattosuchus superciliosus Neptunidraco ammoniticus 'Metriorhynchus' casamiquelai Suchodus durobrivensis |
| Metriorhynchus | Valid | von Meyer, 1832 | lower Kimmeridgian. | France. | | Metiorychus (lapsus calami) | Cricosaurus suevicus Dakosaurus andiniensis Thalattosuchus superciliosus Neptunidraco ammoniticus 'Metriorhynchus' casamiquelai Suchodus durobrivensis |
| Neptunidraco | Valid | Cau & Fanti, 2011 | earliest Bathonian | Italy. | | | Cricosaurus suevicus Dakosaurus andiniensis Thalattosuchus superciliosus Neptunidraco ammoniticus 'Metriorhynchus' casamiquelai Suchodus durobrivensis |
| Neustosaurus | nomen dubium | | Valanginian | | — potential senior synonym of Enaliosuchus | | Cricosaurus suevicus Dakosaurus andiniensis Thalattosuchus superciliosus Neptunidraco ammoniticus 'Metriorhynchus' casamiquelai Suchodus durobrivensis |
| Plesiosuchus | Valid | Owen, 1884 | late Kimmeridgian to early Tithonian | England and possibly Spain. | | | Cricosaurus suevicus Dakosaurus andiniensis Thalattosuchus superciliosus Neptunidraco ammoniticus 'Metriorhynchus' casamiquelai Suchodus durobrivensis |
| Purranisaurus | Valid | Rusconi, 1948 | upper Tithonian | Argentina and Chile. | | | Cricosaurus suevicus Dakosaurus andiniensis Thalattosuchus superciliosus Neptunidraco ammoniticus 'Metriorhynchus' casamiquelai Suchodus durobrivensis |
| Rhacheosaurus | Valid | von Meyer, 1831 | upper Tithonian | Germany. | | | Cricosaurus suevicus Dakosaurus andiniensis Thalattosuchus superciliosus Neptunidraco ammoniticus 'Metriorhynchus' casamiquelai Suchodus durobrivensis |
| Suchodus | Valid | Lydekker, 1890 | middle Callovian to lower Oxfordian | England and France. | | | Cricosaurus suevicus Dakosaurus andiniensis Thalattosuchus superciliosus Neptunidraco ammoniticus 'Metriorhynchus' casamiquelai Suchodus durobrivensis |
| Thalattosuchus | Valid | Young et al., 2020 | lower Callovian to lower Oxfordian | England and France. | | | Cricosaurus suevicus Dakosaurus andiniensis Thalattosuchus superciliosus Neptunidraco ammoniticus 'Metriorhynchus' casamiquelai Suchodus durobrivensis |
| Torvoneustes | Valid | Andrade et al., 2010 | Kimmeridgian to Tithonian | England. | | | Cricosaurus suevicus Dakosaurus andiniensis Thalattosuchus superciliosus Neptunidraco ammoniticus 'Metriorhynchus' casamiquelai Suchodus durobrivensis |
| Tyrannoneustes | Valid | Young et al., 2013 | Callovian | England. | | | Cricosaurus suevicus Dakosaurus andiniensis Thalattosuchus superciliosus Neptunidraco ammoniticus 'Metriorhynchus' casamiquelai Suchodus durobrivensis |

== Subclades ==
Summary of the phylogenetic definitions of metriorhynchid subclades shown in the classification section. These are based on Young and colleagues 2024.

| Name | Named by | Definition |
|---|---|---|
| Dakosaurina | Young et al., 2024 | The largest clade within Metriorhynchidae containing Dakosaurus maximus, but not Metriorhynchus brevirostris, Geosaurus giganteus, Plesiosuchus manselii, and Torvoneustes carpenteri. |
| Geosaurina | Bonaparte, 1845 | The largest clade within Metriorhynchidae containing Geosaurus giganteus, but not Metriorhynchus brevirostris, Plesiosuchus manselii, Torvoneustes carpenteri, and Dakosaurus maximus. |
| Geosaurinae | Bonaparte, 1845 | The largest clade within Metriorhynchidae containing Geosaurus giganteus, but not Rhacheosaurus gracilis, Metriorhynchus brevirostris, and Gracilineustes leedsi. |
| Geosaurini | Bonaparte, 1845 | The smallest clade within Metriorhynchidae containing Tyrannoneustes lythrodectikos, Geosaurus giganteus, Torvoneustes carpenteri, and Dakosaurus maximus. |
| Metriorhynchidae | Fitzinger, 1843 | The smallest clade within Metriorhynchoidea containing Thalattosuchus superciliosus, Gracilineustes leedsi, Metriorhynchus brevirostris, Rhacheosaurus gracilis, and Geosaurus giganteus. |
| Metriorhynchinae | Lydekker, 1888 | The smallest clade within Metriorhynchidae containing Rhacheosaurus gracilis, Metriorhynchus brevirostris, and Gracilineustes leedsi. |
| Plesiosuchina | Young et al.,2014 | The largest clade within Metriorhynchidae containing Plesiosuchus manselii, but not Metriorhynchus brevirostris, Geosaurus giganteus, Torvoneustes carpenteri, and Dakosaurus maximus. |
| Rhacheosaurini | Young et al., 2011 | The largest clade within Metriorhynchidae containing Rhacheosaurus gracilis, but not Metriorhynchus brevirostris and Gracilineustes leedsi. |

== See also ==
- List of marine reptiles
