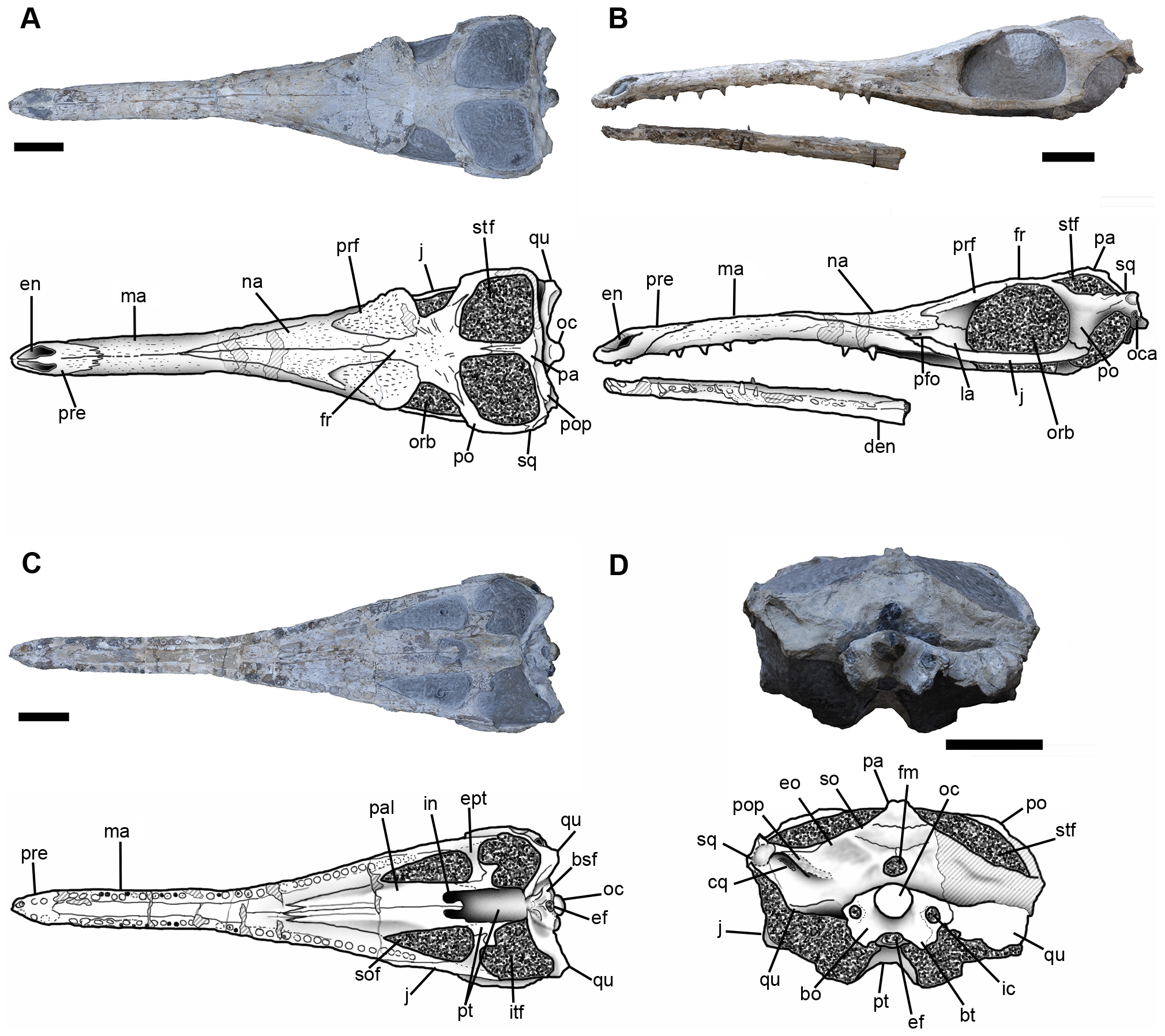
- Holotype skull in multiple views

Scientific classification
- Kingdom: Animalia
- Phylum: Chordata
- Class: Reptilia
- Clade: Archosauria
- Clade: Pseudosuchia
- Clade: Crocodylomorpha
- Suborder: †Thalattosuchia
- Family: †Metriorhynchidae
- Tribe: †Rhacheosaurini
- Genus: †Maledictosuchus; Parrilla-Bel et al., 2013

Species
- M. riclaensis Parrilla-Bel et al., 2013 (type); M. nuyivijanan Barrientos-Lara et al., 2018

= Maledictosuchus =

Maledictosuchus Temporal range: Middle and Late Jurassic

Extinct genus of reptiles

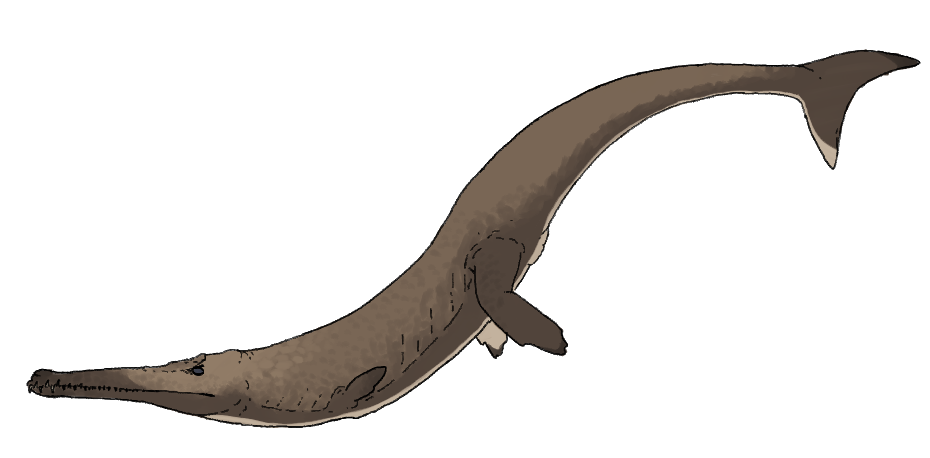

Maledictosuchus is an extinct genus of marine crocodyliform belonging to the family Metriorhynchidae. It is the most basal member of the Rhacheosaurini Tribe with a relatively short body length, measuring 2.95 m (9.7 ft) based on the type specimen.

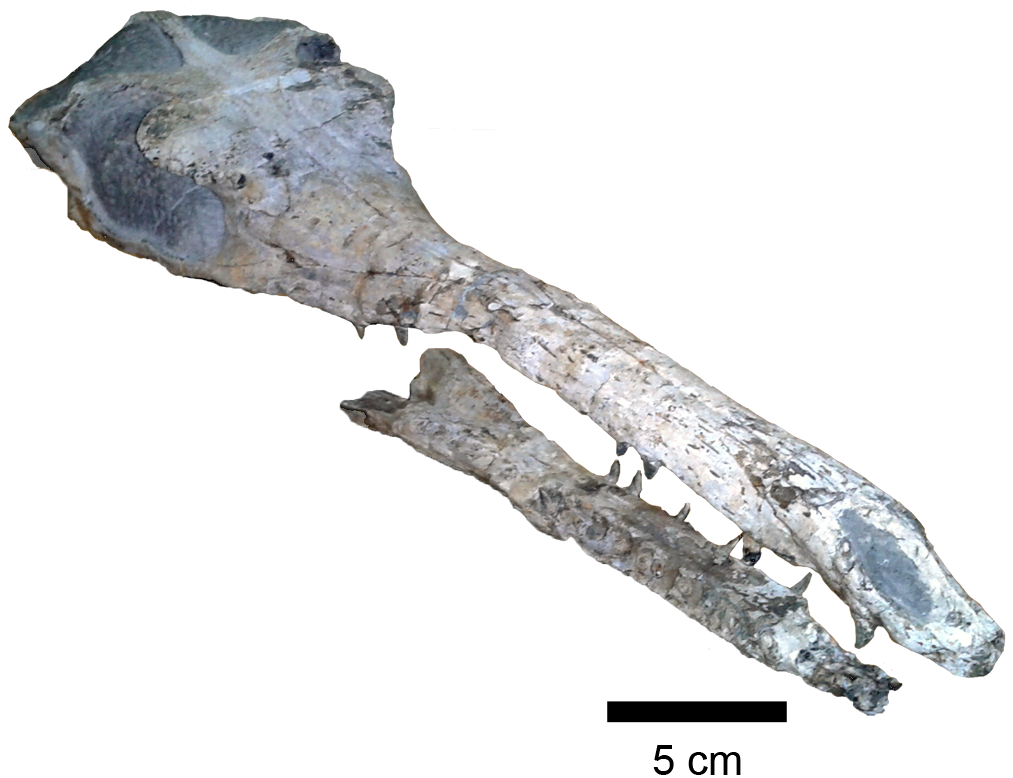
Holotype skull

== Distribution ==
Genus includes two species: the type species M. riclaensis, described on the basis of fossils found in Ricla, Spain, and M. nuyivijanan, known from the Late Jurassic (Kimmeridgian) Sabinal Formation (Tlaxiaco Basin, Oaxaca, Mexico).
