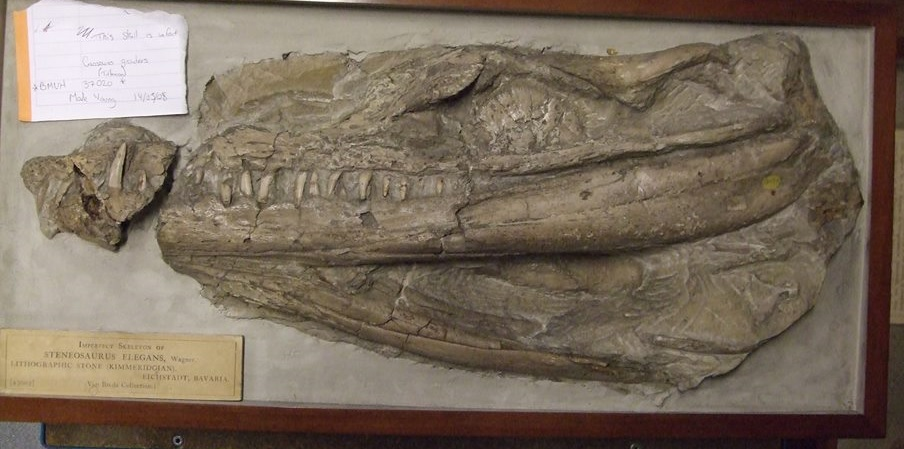
- Skull of G. giganteus

Scientific classification
- Kingdom: Animalia
- Phylum: Chordata
- Class: Reptilia
- Clade: Pseudosuchia
- Clade: Crocodylomorpha
- Suborder: †Thalattosuchia
- Family: †Metriorhynchidae
- Subtribe: †Geosaurina
- Genus: †Geosaurus; Cuvier, 1824

Type species
- †Geosaurus giganteus Sömmerring, 1816

Species
- †G. giganteus (Sömmerring, 1816); †G. grandis (Wagner, 1858); †G. lapparenti (Debelmas & Strannoloubsky, 1957)

Synonyms
- Halilimnosaurus Ritgen, 1826; Brachytaenius von Meyer, 1842

= Geosaurus =

Geosaurus Temporal range: Late Jurassic to Early Cretaceous (Tithonian to Valanginian), 150–136 Ma
- Skull diagram of two known species

Extinct genus of reptiles

Geosaurus is an extinct genus of marine crocodyliform within the family Metriorhynchidae, that lived during the Late Jurassic and the Early Cretaceous. Geosaurus was a carnivore that spent much, if not all, its life out at sea. No Geosaurus eggs or nests have been discovered, so little is known of the reptile's lifecycle, unlike other large marine reptiles of the Mesozoic, such as plesiosaurs or ichthyosaurs which are known to give birth to live young out at sea. Where Geosaurus mated, whether on land or at sea, is currently unknown. The name Geosaurus means "Mother of Giants lizard", and is derived from the Greek Ge- ("Earth", the mythical mother of the Giants) and σαῦρος -sauros ("lizard"). The name Geosaurus was established by the French naturalist Georges Cuvier in 1824.

== Description ==
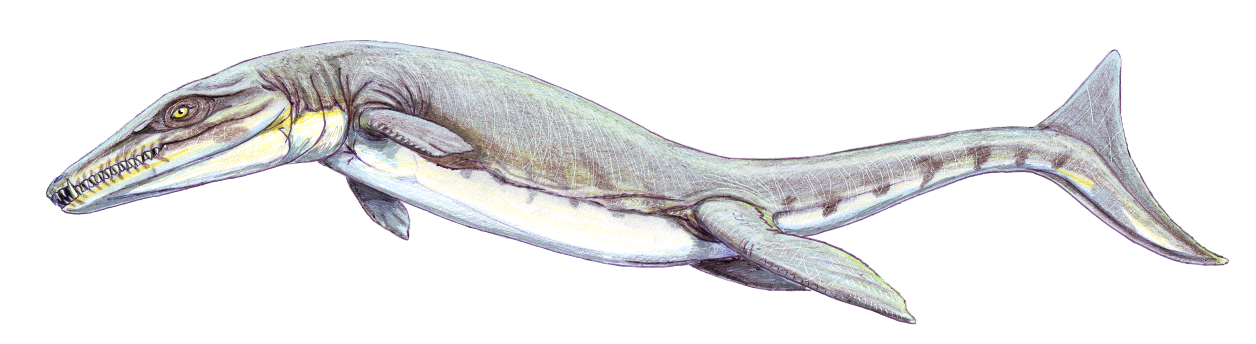
Life reconstruction

Geosaurus was a large marine reptile of the group Crurotarsi, the line leading to modern crocodilians. The type species was about 2.5–3 m (8.2–9.8 ft) long. Specifically, it was a "marine crocodile", or thalattosuchian. Geosaurus was similar in appearance to the related Dakosaurus with a relatively short skull and curved teeth designed for slashing, which it likely used to attack large prey.

Many early depictions of Geosaurus were based on a nearly complete specimen described by Eberhard Fraas, which Fraas classified as a distinct species of Geosaurus, G. suevicus. This specimen was found in Germany and dated to the late Jurassic (Late Kimmeridgian) period. G. suevicus had a distinctively long, narrow snout filled with small, pointed teeth very different from skulls belonging to the type species. Further study and a redescription of Geosaurus published in 2009 showed that these long-snouted forms actually represent individuals of Cricosaurus.

== Classification and species ==
Size comparison of G. giganteus, and the larger but fragmentary species G. lapparenti

Genera considered junior synonyms of Geosaurus include Brachytaenius and Halilimnosaurus . Numerous species had been assigned to this genus since the 19th Century. However, phylogenetic analyses begun in 2005 did not support the monophyly of Geosaurus. Although some traditional species, such as G. suevicus and G. araucanensis formed a natural group, Enaliosuchus is also within that group. This, as well as further study showing that traditional metriorhynchid genera were not grouped based on actual relationships, necessitated almost all traditional species being removed from Geosaurus and reclassified elsewhere, as well as several species previously placed in other genera to be reclassified as species of Geosaurus.

The species included below follow this revised classification, presented by Young and Andrade in 2009.

=== Valid species ===
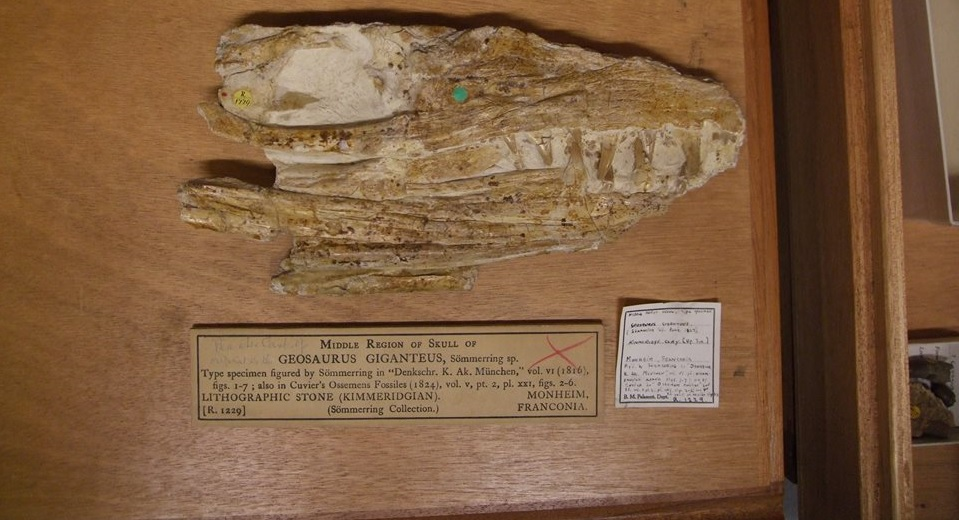
Holotype skull of G. giganteus.

- The type species Geosaurus giganteus, meaning "giant Earth lizard", is known from Western Europe (Germany) of the Late Jurassic (Early Tithonian). It was originally named Lacerta gigantea by von Sömmerring.
- Geosaurus grandis, first described by Wagner in 1858, was formerly considered a species of Cricosaurus. It is known from a complete skull.
- Geosaurus lapparenti is known from south-east France and dates to the early Cretaceous period (Valanginian). It was named in honour of French palaeontologist Albert-Félix de Lapparent, and is based upon isolated skull and post-cranial bones (neck and tail vertebrae and a partial pelvic girdle) from the Early Cretaceous (Valanginian) of France. It was originally classified as a species of Dakosaurus.

A large species of Geosaurus is known only from a single tooth from the Nusplingen Plattenkalk of Germany.

Cladogram after Cau & Fanti (2010).

- Geosaurus
  - G. lapparenti
  - - G. grandis
    - G. giganteus

=== Reclassified species ===
In 2009, Young and de Andrade published a re-description of Geosaurus, examining its relationships and the validity of species lumped into the genus. After performing a phylogenetic analysis of metriorhynchids, they found that many species were grouped in a paraphyletic manner or with the wrong genera. Specifically, they found that several species formerly classified as Geosaurus, including G. suevicus, G. saltillense, G. vignaudi, and G. araucanensis were actually examples of the related Cricosaurus. Rhacheosaurus gracilis, another long-snouted species, was also at one time considered a species of Geosaurus (as G. gracilis).

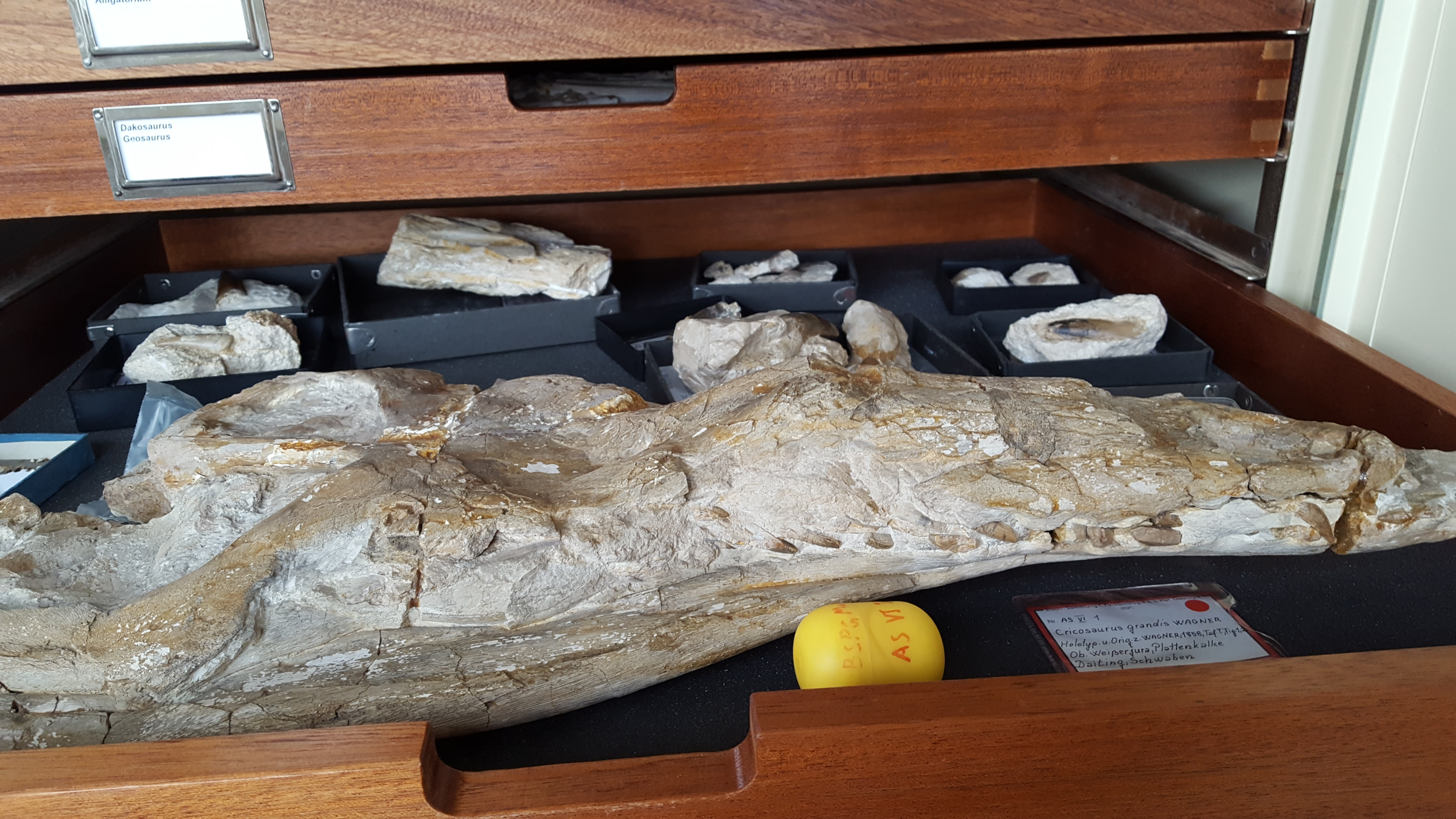
Flattened holotype skull of G. grandis from the Daiting locality. (previously Dakosaurus grandis)

Geosaurus carpenteri, also formerly referred to Dakosaurus, is known from a partial skull. Teeth identical to the known teeth of this species are also known from Yorkshire, UK. It was assigned to its own genus, Torvoneustes by Andrade et al., 2010.

An unnamed specimen classified as Geosaurus was found in the Oxfordian Jagua Formation of Cuba, though further study has shown this species to be more closely related to Cricosaurus as well.

Additionally, Geosaurus fossils have been reported from the Vaca Muerta of Argentina.

== Palaeobiology ==
=== Niche partitioning ===
Several species of metriorhynchids are known from the Mörnsheim Formation (Solnhofen limestone, early Tithonian) of Bavaria, Germany: Geosaurus giganteus, Dakosaurus maximus, Cricosaurus suevicus and Rhacheosaurus gracilis. It has been hypothesised that niche partitioning enabled several species of crocodyliforms to co-exist. The top predators of this Formation appear to be G. giganteus and D. maximus, which were large, short-snouted species with serrated teeth. The long-snouted C. suevicus and R. gracilis would have fed mostly on fish, although the more lightly built Rhacheosaurus may have specialised towards feeding on small prey. In addition to these four species of metriorhynchids, a moderate-sized species of Steneosaurus was also contemporaneous.

== See also ==
- List of marine reptiles
