= Purranisaurus =

Purranisaurus Temporal range: Tithonian

Scientific classification
- Kingdom: Animalia
- Phylum: Chordata
- Class: Reptilia
- Clade: Archosauria
- Clade: Pseudosuchia
- Clade: Crocodylomorpha
- Suborder: †Thalattosuchia
- Family: †Metriorhynchidae
- Subfamily: †Geosaurinae
- Genus: †Purranisaurus; Rusconi 1948

Species
- P. potens Rusconi 1948 (type)

Extinct genus of reptiles

Purranisaurus is an extinct genus of marine crocodyliform from the Late Jurassic aged Vaca Muerta of Argentina. Rusconi originally regarded Purranisaurus potens (the type species) to be a plesiosaur; however, Gasparini demonstrated that it was in fact a metriorhynchid crocodyliform, and that may be a junior synonym of Metriorhynchus. It was about 3.3 m (11 ft) long.

== Taxonomy and phylogeny ==
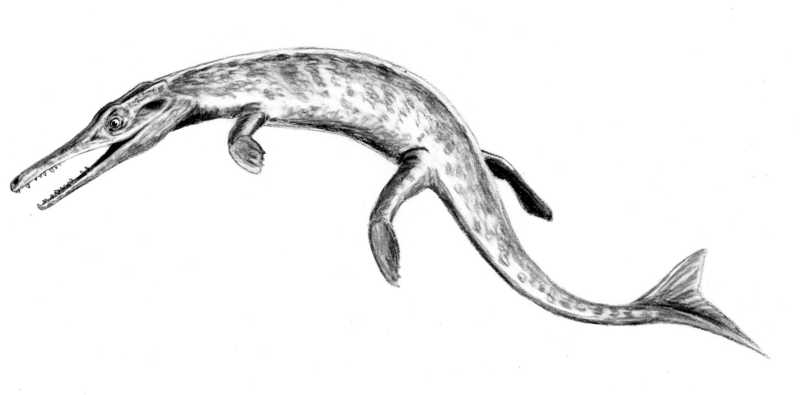
Restoration of 'Metriorhynchus' casamiquelai, which was at one point assigned to Purranisaurus

In the 2000s phylogenetic analysis has shown that Purranisaurus is a distinct metriorhynchid genus. A subsequent study expanded the genus Purranisaurus to include Metriorhynchus casamiquelai and M. westermanni. Following the re-description of the holotype of the type species, only that species is now referred to Purranisaurus.
