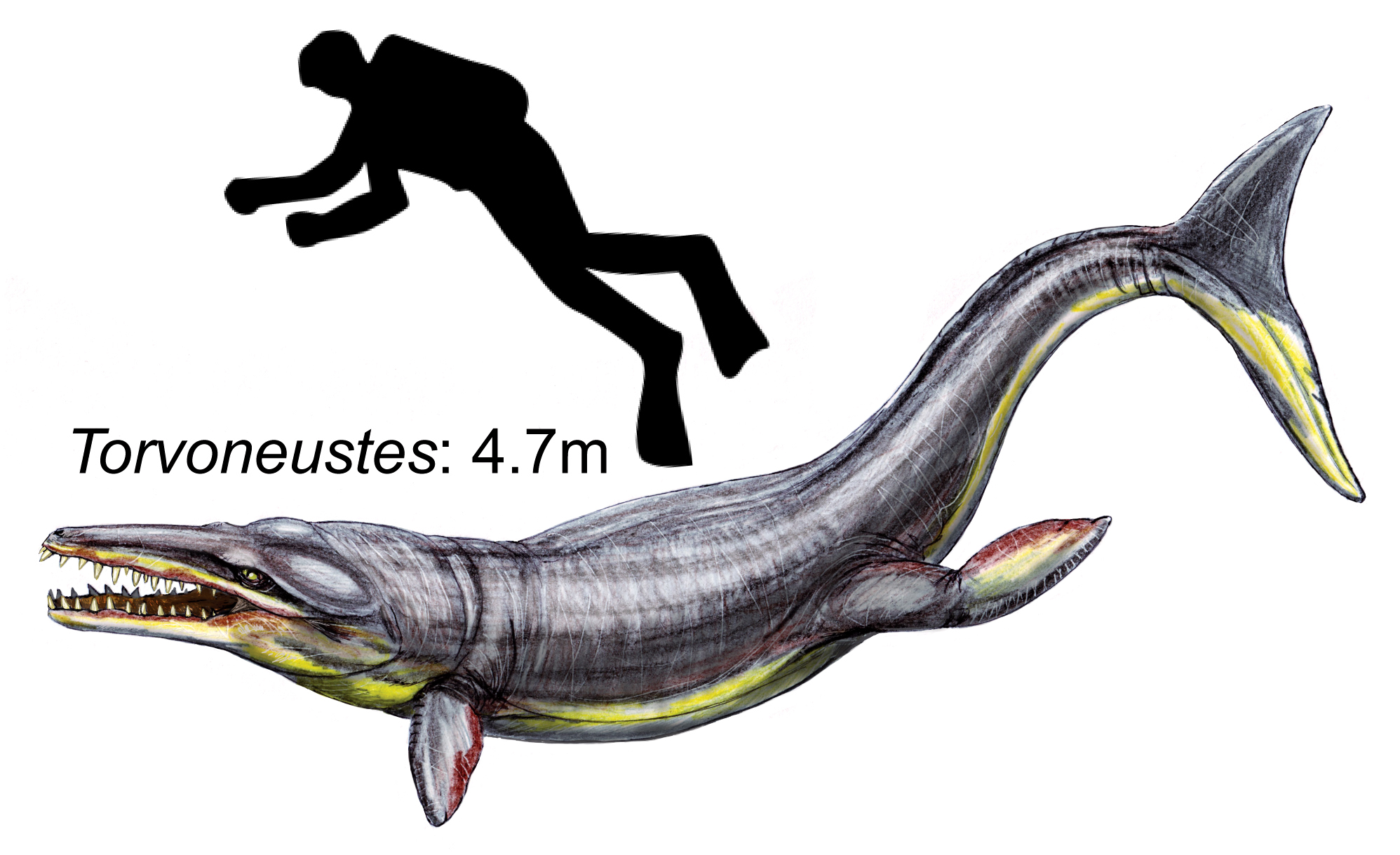
- Size of T. carpenteri

Scientific classification
- Kingdom: Animalia
- Phylum: Chordata
- Class: Reptilia
- Clade: Pseudosuchia
- Clade: Crocodylomorpha
- Suborder: †Thalattosuchia
- Family: †Metriorhynchidae
- Tribe: †Geosaurini
- Genus: †Torvoneustes; Andrade et al., 2010

Type species
- †Dakosaurus carpenteri Wilkinson et al., 2008

Species
- T. carpenteri (Wilkinson et al., 2008); T. coryphaeus Young et al., 2013; T. jurensis Girard et al., 2023; T. mexicanus (Wieland, 1910)

Synonyms
- Dakosaurus carpenteri Wilkinson et al., 2008; Geosaurus carpenteri Young & Andrade, 2009

= Torvoneustes =

Torvoneustes Temporal range: Late Jurassic, 157.3–152.1 Ma

Extinct genus of reptiles

Torvoneustes is an extinct genus of metriorhynchid thalattosuchian. It is known from skull and postcranial remains found in the Kimmeridge Clay Formation of Dorset and Wiltshire, England, the Virgula Marls of Switzerland and also from Oaxaca, Mexico . The holotype skull of the type species was initially assigned to the species Metriorhynchus superciliosus. Postcranial remains were later discovered from the same quarry as the skull, and then these specimens were recognised as belonging to a new species of Dakosaurus, as D. carpenteri. The species was named to honour Simon Carpenter, an amateur geologist from Frome in Somerset, who discovered the fossils.

Dakosaurus carpenteri was later reassigned to the genus Geosaurus in 2008. Two years later, it was assigned to its own genus, Torvoneustes.

When T. carpenteri was considered a species of Dakosaurus, its relatively long snout and smaller, more numerous teeth were thought to be features retained from more basal metriorhynchids. Because of this, the species was seen as a transitional form between long-snouted, piscivorous metriorhynchids and hypercarnivorous, short-snouted species of Dakosaurus. T. coryphaeus reached 3.7 m (12 ft) in length, while T. carpenteri reached 4–4.7 m (13–15 ft) in length; some specimens indicate an even larger body size. T. jurensis was estimated to have reached a length of 4 m (13 ft).

While Dakosaurus and Geosaurus have ziphodont dentition with teeth that are laterally compressed, Torvoneustes is unique in having a false-ziphodont dentition. The common ancestor of Dakosaurus and Geosaurus may also have had a ziphodont dentition, and as Torvoneustes is also a descendant of this common ancestor, it is possible that a ziphodont dentition was secondarily lost in the genus. However, it is also possible that Dakosaurus and Geosaurus acquired similar dentitions independently, and that Torvoneustes is not descended from a ziphodont ancestor.

Fossil teeth of a similar form were also found in a stratum from the Czech Republic dating to late Valanginian.
