= Sheth Ghoolam Hyder =

19th-century British Indian professor of Persian

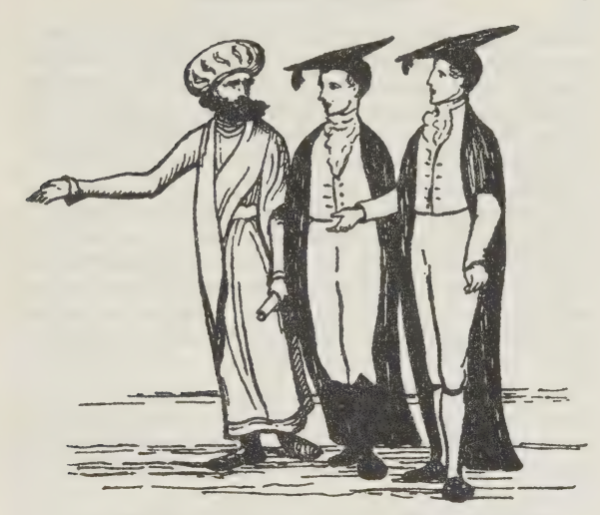
Drawing of Sheth Ghoolam Hyder with two students c. 1808 by Thomas Medland

Sheth Ghoolam Hyder, also spelt as Sheth Ghulam Hyder (1776 – 1823), was a British Indian professor of Persian at the East India Company College which later became known as Haileybury College. He was often addressed by his students as "Moonshi Ghoolam Hyder" and worked at the college from 1806 until his death in 1823.

Born in Darbhanga in the Indian state of Bihar and arriving in the UK in 1806, he is considered to be one of the first Indians to teach in the UK. His appointment was shortly followed by a wave of other Indian teachers at the college including Meer Abdul Alee of Benares and Meer Hassan Ali of Lucknow.

== Life and career ==
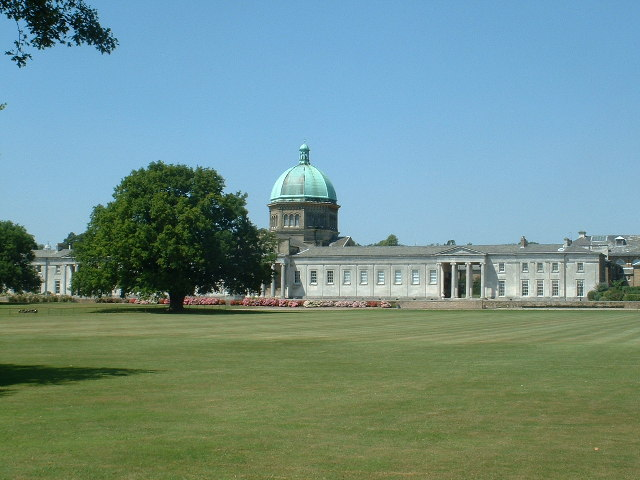
The former East India Company College, now Haileybury and Imperial Service College

Ghoolam Hyder was born in Darbhanga, Bihar in 1776. In 1806, he travelled on his own initiative to London to seek employment as a teacher of the Persian language. The East India Company college opened in August of that year, and he applied for the role of "Persian writing master". As a demonstration of his knowledge, he included in his application a sample of his writing in Persian calligraphy. Although his English was deemed barely adequate, he was appointed shortly afterwards.

His annual salary was £200, which was the equivalent of the European junior faculty of the college and considered to be near the top of the pay scales for Indian teachers at Fort William College, which usually range from £36 to £240 per year. This was, however, still below the usual rate for British professors of Persian and Hindustani, which ranged from £1,800 to £3,200. Ghoolam worked as the assistant to the professor Captain Charles Stewart. Together, they were appointed to the Muhammadan Division of the college, which specialised in the instruction of Persian, Hindustani and Arabic.

Students of Ghoolam Hyder would copy select passages in the Persian script, and he would also test their pronunciations. The Company authorities also requested Ghoolam Hyder to teach Persian to the pupils of the preparatory school that was associated with the college. The college directors continued to recruit language teachers from India following his appointment. A colleague of Ghoolam Hyder's who was also associated with Haileybury and recruited from India during the same period was Mirza Muhammed Ibrahim. He would often teach wearing his traditional attire, as shown in a drawing from 1808.

Ghoolam Hyder found his salary insufficient to cover his expenses in England as he was often sending money back to his family in India. In 1808, he composed a formal petition for a raise in his salary which the company did not approve of, however, they did grant a £40 annual subsidy to his house rent. Ghoolam Hyder had to maintain two families, as he had a wife and two children still in India in addition to his marriage to an English woman, Rose Slocomb. He married Rose in St Botolph's Church in London, and they had at least 6 children together. It was noted that Rose was viewed in the eyes of Ghoolam's colleagues as his "social inferior" as she had "no family".

=== Final years ===
Over the next 13 years, despite continuing illnesses, Hyder continued to teach Persian orthography. During these years, he incurred mounting debts and failed to achieve promotions within his department as Britons superseded him. He died in May 1823, leaving 4 children and his pregnant wife, Rose, who was deeply in debt. Out of respect for him, Hyder's students contributed £15 towards his gravestone and his supervisor, Charles Stewart, purchased £45 worth of the family possessions from an auction. Stewart also enrolled two of Ghoolam Hyder's sons in the First Church Hospital, and had two of his daughters trained as domestic servants. Rose Hyder received a pension from the East India Company of £40 annually, which was not sufficient for her to maintain the middle-class lifestyle that she previously had when her husband was alive.

== See also ==
- Dean Mahomed
- British Indians
