= Henry Walter (antiquary) =

English Cleric and Antiquary (1785-1859)

Henry Walter (1785–1859) was an English cleric and antiquary.

== Early life ==
Born at Louth, Lincolnshire on 28 January 1785, he was the eldest son of James Walter, master of Louth grammar school and later rector of Market Rasen. The Walter family was connected to the Austens: James Walter's father William-Hampson Walter was step-brother to George Austen, father of Jane Austen.

Henry Walter was admitted to St John's College, Cambridge, on 1 March 1802, and graduated B.A. in 1806, classed as second wrangler in the Mathematical Tripos, behind Frederick Pollock. He was also junior Smith's prizeman. He was elected fellow and tutor of his college, retaining his fellowship until his marriage in 1824; commenced M.A. in 1809; and proceeded to the degree of B.D. in 1816.

In 1810 Walter visited Hawkstone Park, and much later (1852) published an account of the celebrated "hermit of Hawkstone". This revealed that a paid poor man, who acted the part, had at some point been replaced by a stuffed dummy.

== At the East India College ==
Walter was appointed professor of natural philosophy at the East India Company College in 1816. He travelled in 1817 with Hugh Percy, 3rd Duke of Northumberland, who had been one of his pupils at Cambridge. He was elected a Fellow of the Royal Society on 11 November 1819.

On 7 May 1821 Walter was instituted as rector of Hazelbury Bryan in Dorset, on the presentation of the Duke of Northumberland. He held his two positions together until 1830. Michael Pakenham Edgeworth, a pupil at the College right at the end of Walter's time there, reported home in letters that Walter had the nickname "Bobby". He also found him anti-Catholic, as were colleagues including Joseph Batten and Charles Webb Le Bas.

== Parish priest ==
Hazelbury Bryan in the first half of the 19th century still had much in the way of unenclosed common lands. Walter acted to create an ad hoc system of allotments there in the 1820s, renting at £2 per acre some 13 acres of his own land, for which the market rent might be as much as four times more. In 1823 he took legal action to prevent what he saw as abuse of the parochial relief system in his parish; he objected to the system under which the poor rate subsidised labourers who were sent from farmer to farmer (the "roundsmen"). In his later writing he described the riot that broke out in the Vale of Blackmoor on 26 November 1830.

David Parry Okeden of More Crichel published his Letter to the Members in Parliament for Dorset (1830), advocating poor law reform. Okeden, a Radical Whig, chose six places to illustrate his views on the "good" and "bad" management of poor relief. Walter he considered exemplary of "good" management: the involvement of a parish priest concerned directly with the material welfare of the poor. The "bad" management was precisely when magistrates became involved. Walter then contributed further in the discussion of social conditions in Dorset, and the debate on the Speenhamland system, with his Letter to the Rev. H. F. Yeatman (1833), to Harry Farr Yeatman. He armed himself with a quantitative analysis of the meaning for labouring families of the 13s. 4d. subsistence sum mentioned in the system, at the same type pointing to the issue of low wages.

At the end of decade Walter was drawn into controversy with George Loveless, who addressed his pamphlet The Church Shown Up: In a Letter (1838) to him.

Walter gave tuition to private pupils, who included John Clavell Mansel-Pleydell. He contributed to the Record, controlled by Alexander Haldane]; and wrote in the Christian Guardian to criticise a move in 1850 by Oxford followers of Edward Pusey. He died at Hazelbury Bryan on 25 January 1859, and was buried in the churchyard of the parish. In 1824 he had married Emily Anne, daughter of William Baker of Bayfordbury, Hertfordshire.

== Works ==
In 1800 Walter was a prizewinner, with Thomas Love Peacock and Leigh Hunt, in an essay competition in the Juvenile Library.

For the Parker Society Walter edited three volumes of William Tyndale's writings:

- Doctrinal Treatises, and Introductions to different portions of the Holy Scriptures, 1848;
- Expositions and Notes on sundry portions of the Holy Scriptures, 1849; and
- An Answer to Sir Thomas More's Dialogue, 1850. This contained two other works, The Supper of the Lord, after the true meaning of John VI. and 1 Cor. XI., and Wm. Tracy's Testament expounded. At the time of writing his introduction, Walter assumed the Supper of the Lord was by Tyndale, even though the evidence was on the face of it equivocal. While the work was in press, he changed his mind, and attributed it in Notes and Queries to George Joye, withdrawing from the position that Thomas More knew that Tyndale was the author. This second attribution is the one that scholars now support.

Walter also brought out an edition of The Primer ... set forth by the order of King Edward VI, London, 1825. His own writings included:

- Lectures on the Evidences in favour of Christianity and the Doctrines of the Church of England, London, 1816.
- A Letter to the Right Rev. Herbert Lord Bishop of Peterborough, on the Independence of the authorised Version of the Bible, London, 1823–1828. Addressed to Herbert Marsh, and followed by a second Letter. Walter in this Letter was cited by Edwin Cone Bissell as an authority for the knowledge of Hebrew of the translators of the King James Bible.
- The Connexion of Scripture History made plain for the Young by an Abridgment of it, London, 1840.
- A History of England, in which it is intended to consider Man and Events on Christian Principles, London, 1840, 7 vols.
- First letter to the Lord Bishop of Salisbury, on that episcopal charge which the letter-writer heard from him with much sorrow in 1842 (1845). The Christian Remembrancer was dismissive of this controversial work.
- On the Antagonism of various Popish Doctrines and Usages to the Honour of God and to His Holy Word, London, 1853.

== Notes ==
Attribution

This article incorporates text from a publication now in the public domain: Lee, Sidney, ed. (1899). "Walter, Henry". Dictionary of National Biography. Vol. 59. London: Smith, Elder & Co.
