= 1857 in Iran =

- Decades
- See also: Other events of 1857; Years in Iran

The following lists events that happened during 1857 in Qajar era.

== Incumbents ==
- Monarch: Naser al-Din Shah Qajar

== Births ==
- January 8 – Amanullah Mirza Qajar, Iranian prince.
- ? – Abdol-Hossein Farman Farma, Qajar prince.
- ? – Ali-Qoli Khan Bakhtiari, Iranian revolutionary.
- ? – Hassan Esfandiari, Iranian politician.
- ? – Mirza Jawad Agha Maleki Tabrizi, one of the contemporary Islamic scholars.

== Deaths ==
- ? – Mirza Muhammed Ibrahim, Iranian educator.
