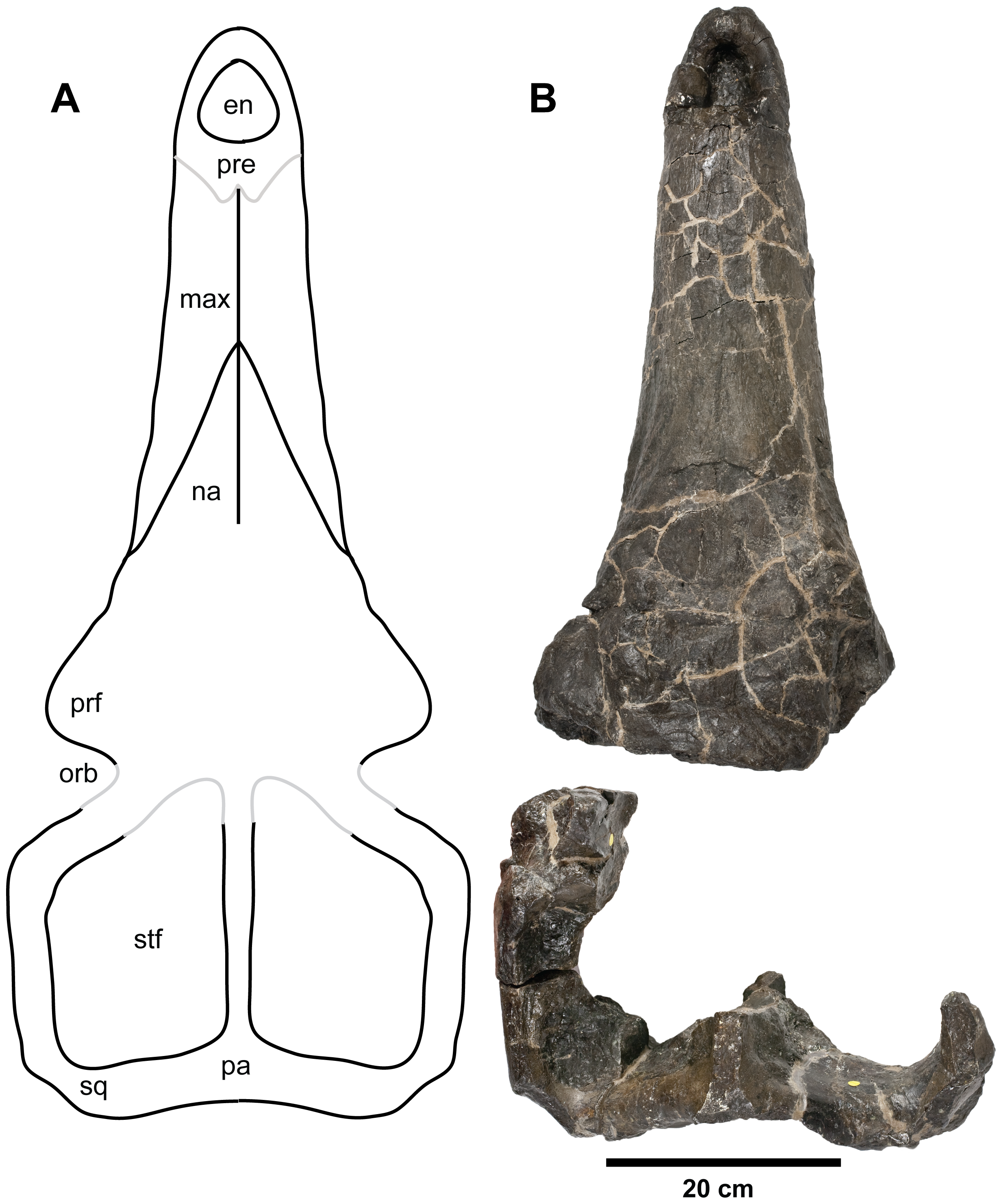
- Skull of the holotype in dorsal view (NHMUK PV OR40103)

Scientific classification
- Kingdom: Animalia
- Phylum: Chordata
- Class: Reptilia
- Clade: Pseudosuchia
- Clade: Crocodylomorpha
- Suborder: †Thalattosuchia
- Family: †Metriorhynchidae
- Subtribe: †Plesiosuchina
- Genus: †Plesiosuchus; Owen, 1884

Type species
- †Plesiosuchus manselii (Hulke, 1870 [originally Steneosaurus])

= Plesiosuchus =

Plesiosuchus Temporal range: Late Jurassic, 154–149 Ma
- Skull diagram in different views

Extinct genus of reptiles

Plesiosuchus is an extinct genus of geosaurine metriorhynchid crocodyliform known from the Late Jurassic (late Kimmeridgian to early Tithonian stage) of Dorset, England and possibly also Spain. It contains a single species, Plesiosuchus manselii.

== Discovery ==
Skeletal reconstruction and size comparison of the holotype and a larger specimen (white = preserved)

The type and referred specimens of Plesiosuchus were discovered by John Clavell Mansel-Pleydell in the 1860s alongside the remains of several other large-bodied marine reptiles along the coast of Dorset. Mansel-Pleydell gave these remains to the British Museum (now in the Natural History Museum) in 1866. Part of the holotype of P. manselii (NHMUK PV OR40103a) was first described by John Hulke in 1869. He referred it to Steneosaurus rostro-minor Geoffroy (1825), alongside Dakosaurus maximus and other specimens. Initially, the skull (NHMUK PV OR40103) was believed to be pliosaurian; it was the preparator Mr Davies that suggested a crocodylian nature for the skull. In 1870, Hulke described the skull, which is preserved in two sections: the rostrum and the occiput. Hulke suggested that "this head and the lower jaw both belonged to one individual" as both the same dimensions and were discovered in close proximity in a reef exposed at low water in Kimmeridge Bay. Some material was destroyed due to pyrite decay while the isolated bone fragment referred to as the "upper maxilla" has never been figured and cannot be located. Richard Owen erected the genus Plesiosuchus for S. manselii in 1884 as he considered it to be more similar morphologically to extant crocodylians than to Steneosaurus. Woodward (1885) referred the species to the genus Dakosaurus. Lydekker (1888) synonymized P. manselii with Dakosaurus maximus while Fraas (1902) regarded the two species to be synonymous or closely related. Phylogenetic analyses of Young & Andrade (2009), Cau & Fanti (2011) and Young et al. (2011) support the hypothesis that the two are separate species of Dakosaurus. Young et al. (2012) resurrected the genus name Plesiosuchus as their phylogenetic analysis found a paraphyletic Dakosaurus and suggested more basal position for P. manselii within Geosaurini than previously thought.

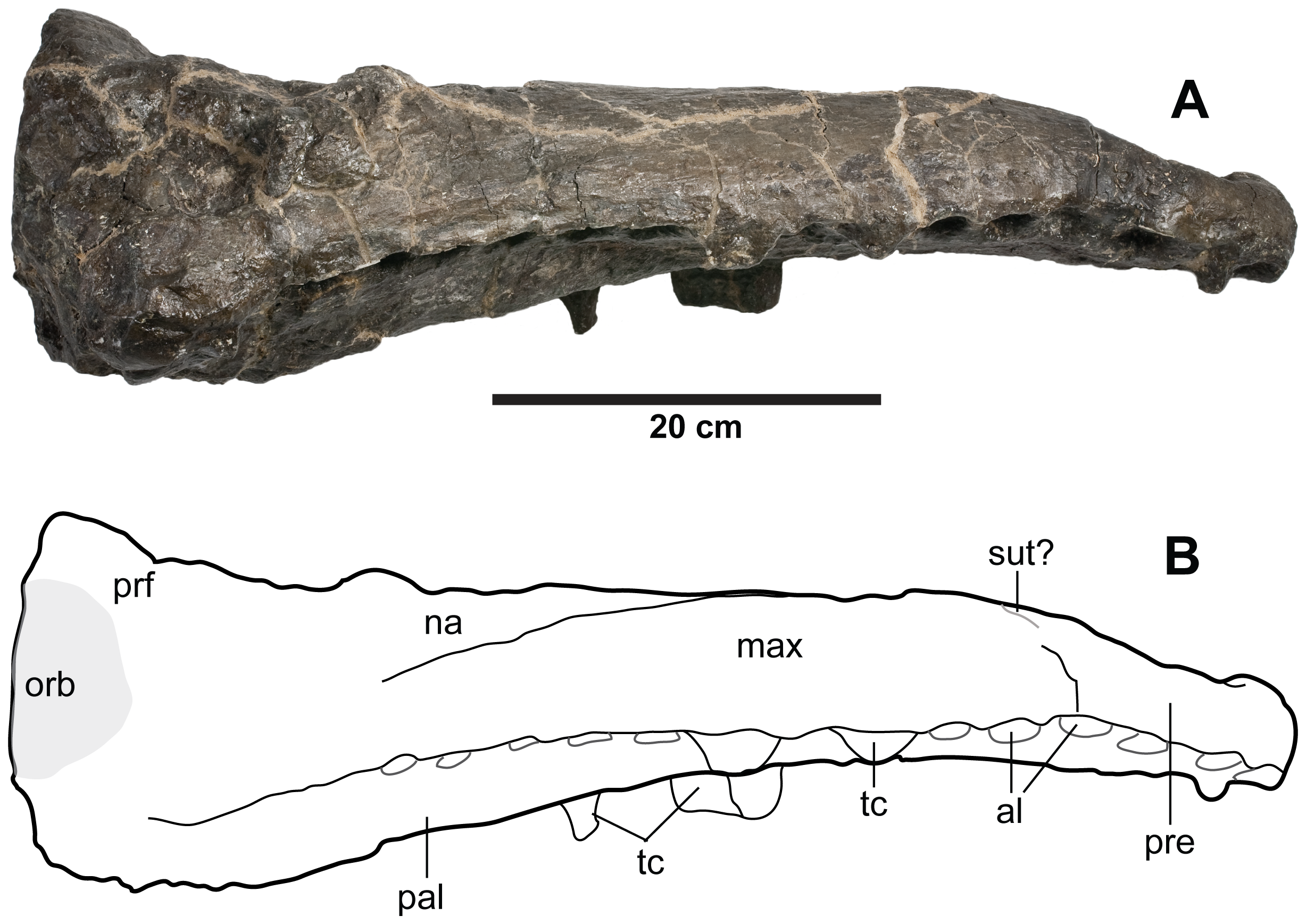
Snout of the holotype

The holotype of Plesiosuchus includes, NHMUK PV OR40103, a broken and incomplete skull with a mandible and isolated postcranial remains (NHMUK PV OR40103a). The incomplete skull includes the snout and the occiput, lacking the occipital condyle, with fragments of the supratemporal arches and isolated right articular. NHMUK PV OR40103a includes the right mandibular ramus, some isolated teeth, a humerus, and numerous ribs and vertebrae that are partially or completely imbedded in matrix. Two further specimens may belong to the holotype: NHMUK PV OR40104 – an occipital condyle, and NHMUK PV OR40105 – carpal and tarsal bones. Both specimens were donated to the University of Toronto through Professor Ramsay Wright in 1900. From examining the register in the NHMUK Earth Sciences Department, it is possible both specimens were part of NHMUK PV OR40103, although neither specimen could be located at the Royal Ontario Museum. The holotype of Plesiosuchus represents a large individual. Although it is uncertain whether the holotype (and referred specimens) belong to adults or subadults as none of the vertebrae are well enough preserved to determine the nature of the neurocentral sutures, its total body length is estimated to be 5.42 m (17.8 ft). It was collected from the late Kimmeridgian (Aulacostephanus autissiodorensis Sub-Boreal ammonite Zone) Lower Kimmeridge Clay Formation of Kimmeridge Bay, Dorset. The specimen NHMUK PV OR40103b, a short series of cervicodorsal vertebrae preserved in matrix, is also a thalattosuchian due to its possession of several apomorphies of the group. However, it does not belong to the same individual as the holotype as the vertebrae are much smaller than those of NHMUK PV OR40103a, and the matrix is of a different composition. It is unclear whether it belongs to Plesiosuchus or another metriorhynchid, and therefore it is considered to be Thalattosuchia indeterminate.

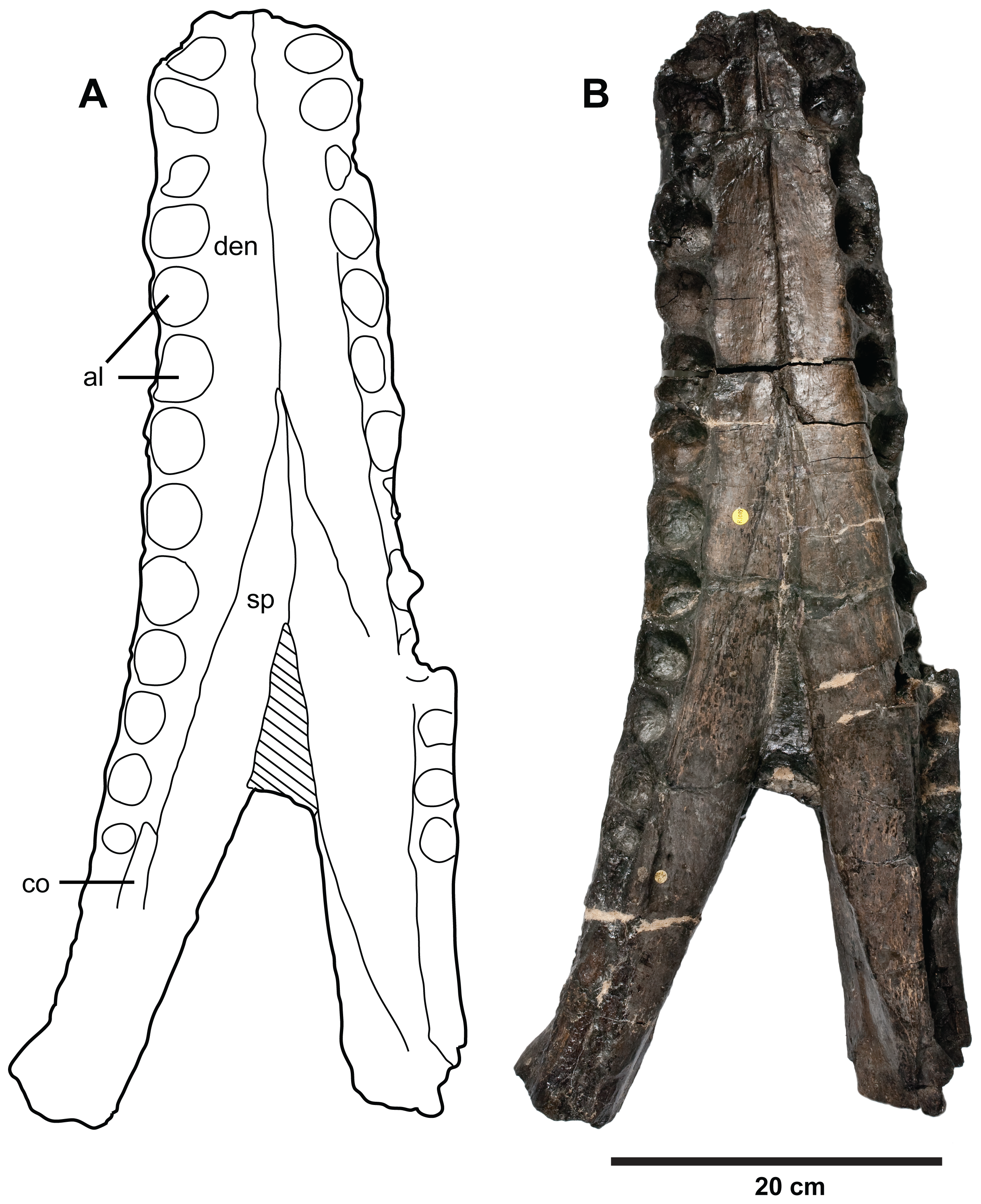
Referred specimen NHMUK PV R1089

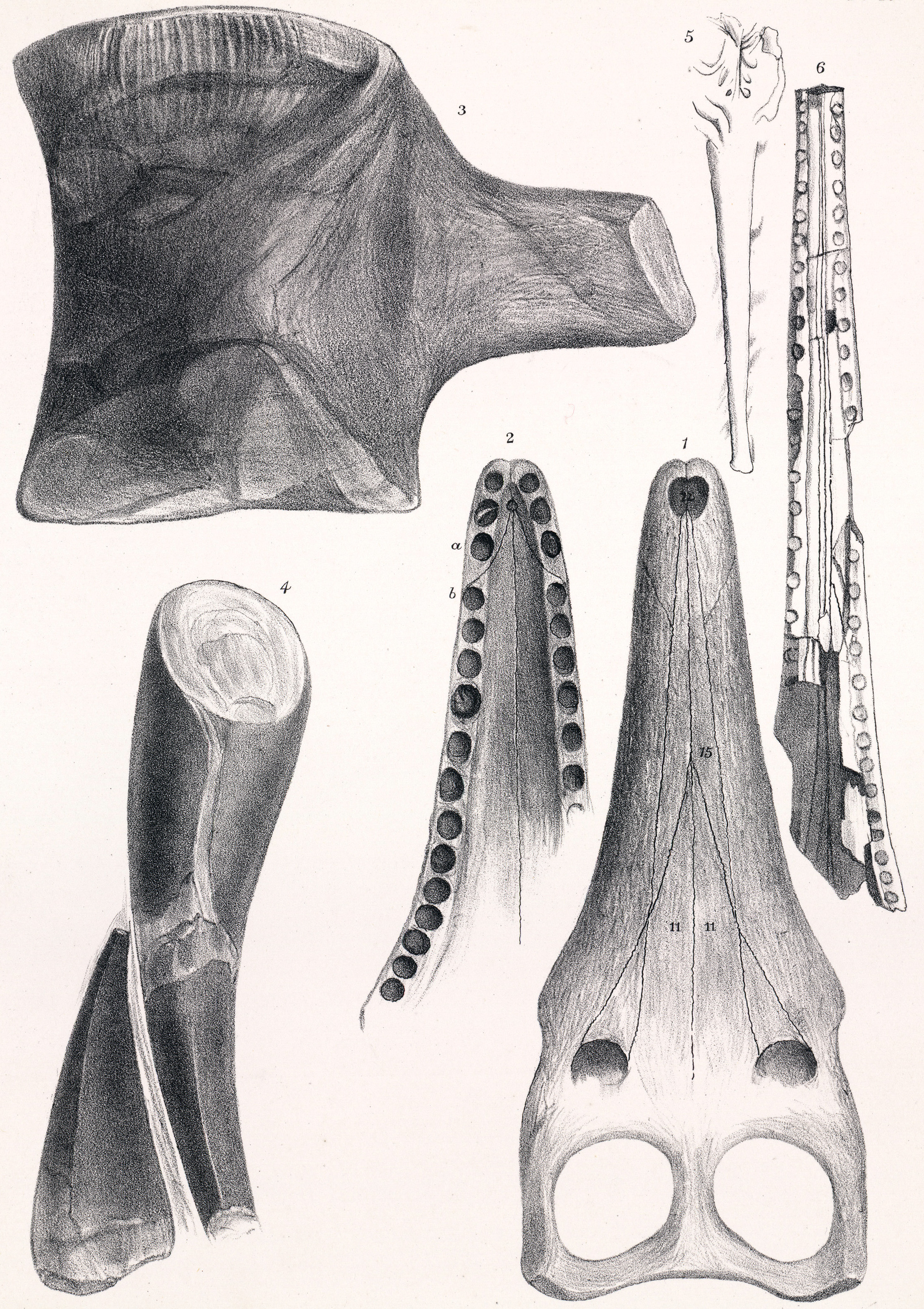
Lithograph of the holotype, with associated vertebra and teeth

NHMUK PV R1089, a mandible and a braincase with part of the supratemporal arches collected from the early Tithonian (Pectinatites wheatleyensis Sub-Boreal ammonite Zone) Upper Kimmeridge Clay Formation, of Kimmeridge is also referred to Plesiosuchus. It was also presented by Mansel-Pleydell in 1866, and as with the holotype, was initially considered to belong to a pliosaurid plesiosaur. It was originally described by Owen (1869) as a referred specimen to the species Pliosaurus trochanterius. However, Owen never provided evidence for this referral and there were no overlapping elements between NHMUK PV R1089 and the holotype of P. trochanterius (thought to be an isolated femur but is actually a humerus that was collected from the early Tithonian of Shotover Hill, Oxfordshire, England). Later, both Eudes-Deslongchamps (1867–1869) and Woodward (1885) referred it to the metriorhynchid genus Metriorhynchus while Tarlo (1960) considered it to be crocodylian, and Buffetaut (1982) considered it to be a large metriorhynchid closely related to Dakosaurus. Although both Lydekker (1888) and Vignaud (1995) referred the specimen to the teleosaurid species Machimosaurus mosae, Young et al. (2012) showed that its distinct from Machimosaurus that possess external mandibular fenestrae and an anterior transverse expansion of the mandibular symphysis, whereas NHMUK PV R1089 lacks both features. Furthermore, both species of Machimosaurus lack the prearticular, which is present in NHMUK PV R1089. Additionally, NHMUK PV R1089 exhibits extreme reduction in dentition (13 dentary alveoli compared to 19–25 in Machimosaurus) that is otherwise observed in geosaurine metriorhynchids. As the holotype of P. manselii and NHMUK PV R1089 share a cranial apomorphy and can both be excluded from other closely related geosaurines, Young et al. (2012) referred it to P. manselii. NHMUK PV R1089 represents even larger individual than the holotype with 132.2 cm (52.0 in) long mandible, while the mandible of NHMUK PV OR40103a is approximately 111 cm (44 in) in length. Thus, NHMUK PV R1089 has been estimated to have been about 6.83 m (22.4 ft) in length, surpassing the estimated length of the pliosaurid Liopleurodon ferox, which is approximately 6.39 m (21.0 ft).

Skeletal reconstruction and size comparison of an indeterminate metriorhynchid specimen, referred to as Aff. Plesiosuchus sp. based on its large size

Two further specimens in the Museum of Jurassic Marine Life are referable to Plesiosuchus manselii: K181, isolated teeth, partial maxilla?, partial left mandible, ribs, vertebrae, femur; and K434, right dentary. The isolated Spanish tooth crown (MUJA-1004) described by Ruiz-Omeñaca et al. (2010) as Dakosaurus sp. was referred to cf. Plesiosuchus manselii by Young et al. (2012) as it shares the enamel ornamentation pattern, denticles size and lack of wear observed on the teeth with the holotype of Plesiosuchus and can be distinguished from any other known geosaurine. It was collected from the Kimmeridgian-aged Tereñes Formation in La Griega Beach of Asturias, northern Spain.

Fossil teeth of a similar form were found also in the Czech Republic and formally published in 2021 (in a stratum dating to hauterivian, some 130 milliony years ago).

== Description ==
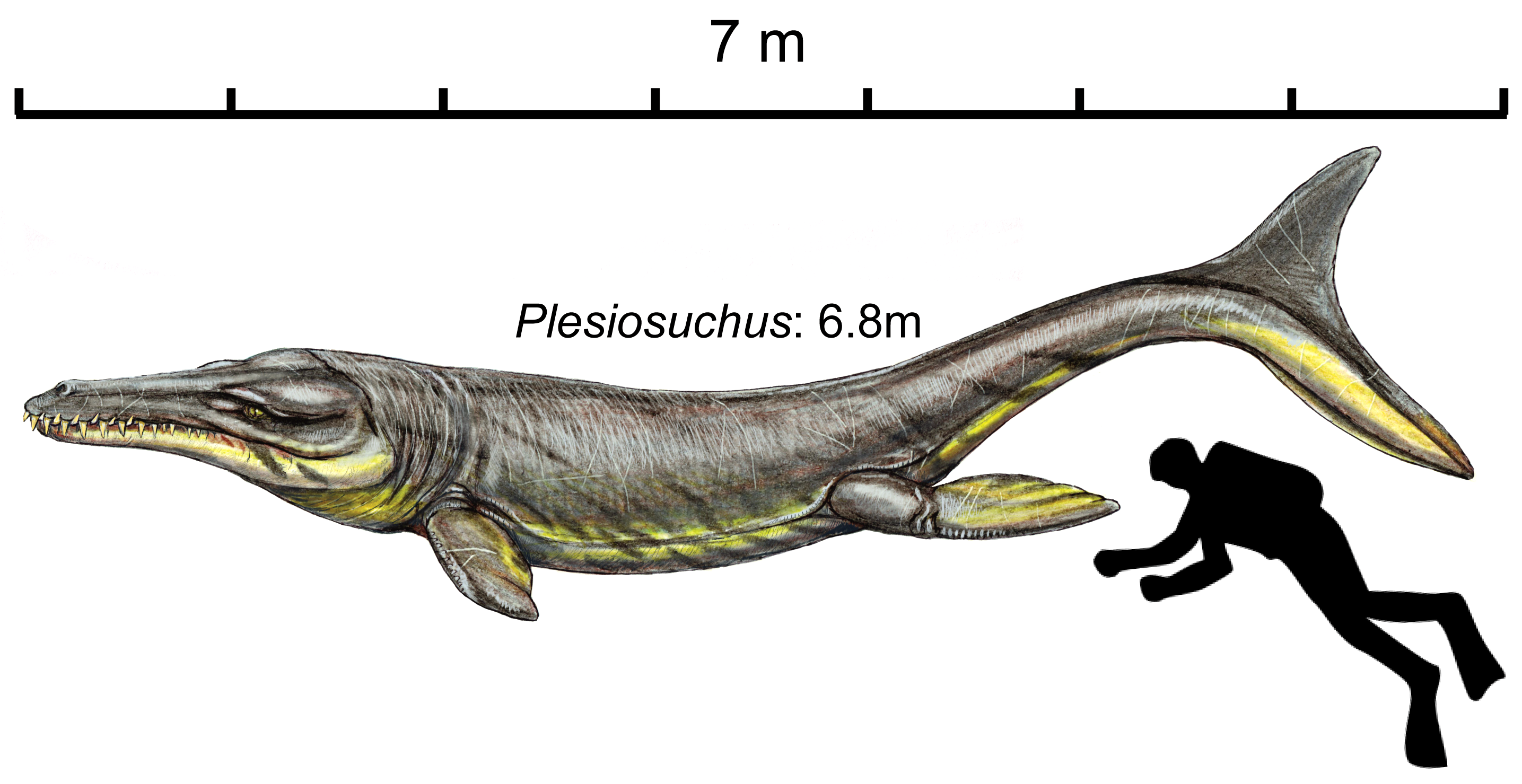
Restoration

Young et al. (2012) identified seven autapomorphies of P. manselii that this species possesses to the exclusion of all other metriorhynchids. P. manselii have rectangular-shaped denticles in lingual view. Its tooth enamel ornamentation is largely inconspicuous, but there are apicobasally aligned ridges of low-relief. The mesial margin of some of its teeth have a pronounced distal curvature. Additionally, its palatines are strongly convex with a pronounced ridge along the midline. In palatal view, the palatine width narrows anteriorly from the suborbital fenestrae to the midline, in a distinct elongate triangular shape. The maxillopalatine suture midline terminus is level to the fourth maxillary alveolus. Finally, its quadrate distal articular surface is not separated into two condyles by a sulcus, and has only a very shallow depression at the centre. Like other geosaurins, P. manselii have large robust teeth, with moderate to strong mediolateral compression. Other notable characters of P. manselii are the presence of a separation between premaxilla and nasal approximately subequal to the midline length of the premaxilla, carinae formed by a keel and true microscopic denticles, and a long mandibular symphysis to which 9 out of 13 dentary teeth are adjacent. In dorsal view, the lateral margins of the prefrontals have an inflexion point directed posteriorly at an angle of approximately 70 degrees from the anteroposterior axis of the skull.

== Classification ==
Initially, phylogenetic analyses of metriorhynchids (such as Young & Andrade (2009), Cau & Fanti (2011) and Young et al. (2011)) found support for the hypothesis that Dakosaurus maximus and P. manselii are separate species of Dakosaurus. Young et al. (2012) resurrected the genus name Plesiosuchus as their phylogenetic analysis found a paraphyletic Dakosaurus and suggested more basal position for P. manselii within Geosaurini than previously thought. P. manselii was found in a polytomy at the base of Geosaurini with Torvoneustes and a clade that includes Dakosaurus and Geosaurus. Although this analysis is the most extensive metriorhynchoid phylogeny to date, some geosaurines were excluded from it. Purranisaurus potens was removed as it is currently under re-description and "Metriorhynchus" brachyrhynchus was recoded due to the uncertainty of whether the Suchodus durobrivensis is a junior synonym of the former or its closest known relative. Finally, the paraphyly of Dakosaurus caused the presence of unusually large dentition (apicobasal length in excess of 6 cm (2.4 in) cm) to be homoplastic among geosaurins. As the referral of Aggiosaurus nicaeensis to Dakosaurus by Young & Andrade (2009) was based solely on this character, Aggiosaurus which has the largest dentition of any known metriorhynchid (up to 12 cm (4.7 in) cm in apicobasal length), cannot be considered a junior synonym of either Dakosaurus or Plesiosuchus. The same problem exist in the identification of two recently discovered, but fragmentary, geosaurine skulls from the Kimmeridgian of Mexico that were initially referred to an unnamed species of Dakosaurus by Cau & Fanti (2011), Young et al. (2011) and others. Furthermore, it is possible that the skulls represent two different taxa, as one skull shares some traits with a newly discovered unnamed metriorhynchine, also from Mexico. The closest relative of Plesiosuchus is the genus Suchodus.

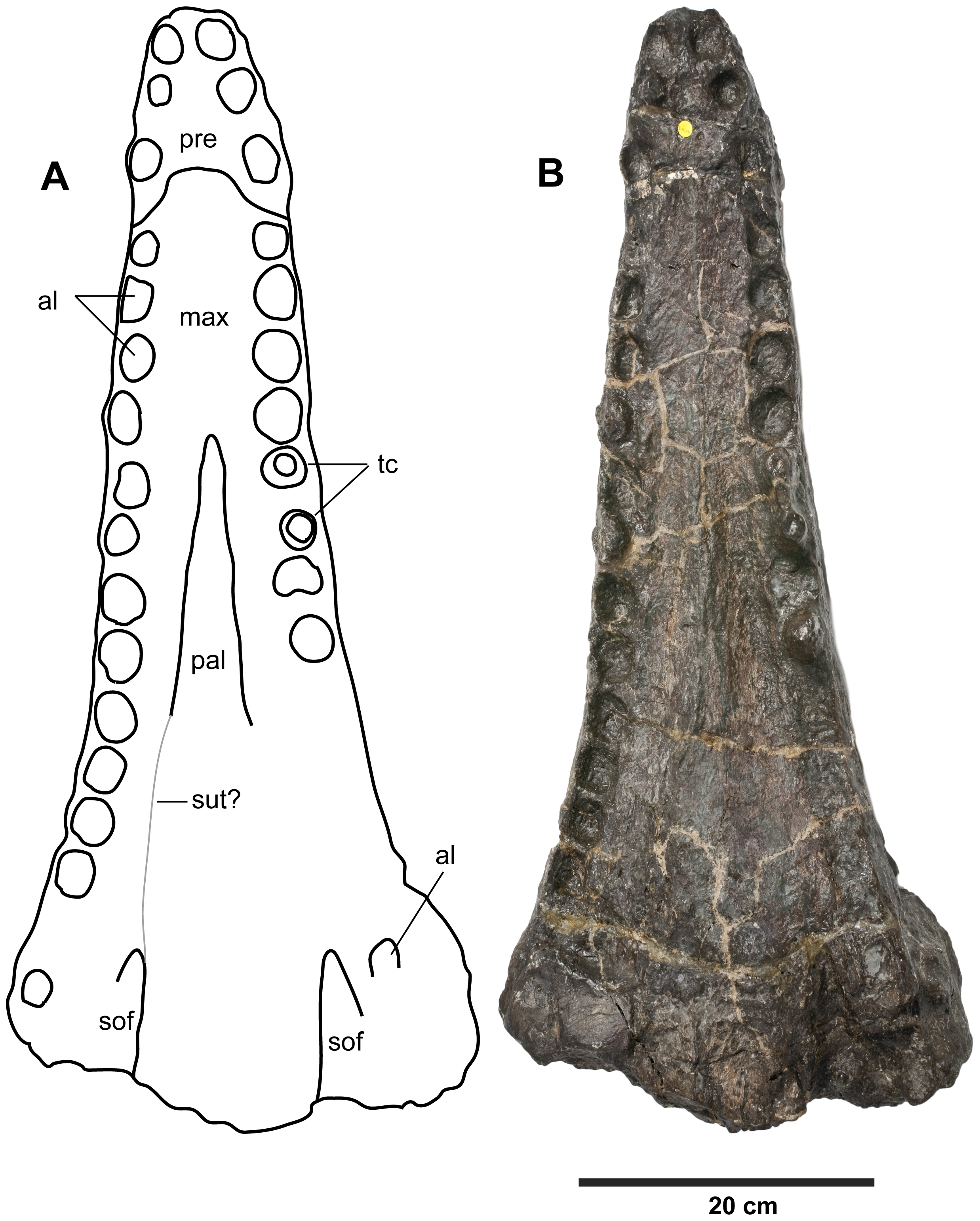
Palate of the holotype

The cladogram below is from an analysis by Léa Girard and colleagues in their description of Torvoneustes jurensis.

- Geosaurinae
  - - "Metriorhynchus" casamiquelai
    - "Metriorhynchus" westermanii
  - - Neptunidraco ammoniticus
    - - "Metriorhynchus" brachyrhynchus
      - Geosaurini
        - - - - Geosaurina
                - Ieldraan melkshamensis
                - - Geosaurus grandis
                  - - Geosaurus giganteus
                    - Geosaurus lapparenti
              - - Plesiosuchina
                  - Suchodus durobrivensis
                  - Plesiosuchus manselii
                - Dakosaurina
                  - Mr Leeds dakosaur
                  - - Vaches Noires dakosaur
                    - - Dakosaurus maximus
                      - Dakosaurus andiniensis
        - "Subclade T"
          - Tyrannoneustes lythrodectikos
          - - Purranisaurus potens
            - - "E Clade"
                - Swiss snout
                - - Druegendorf Taxon
                  - - Chouquet cf. hastifer
                    - - English snout
                      - Mr. Passmores Specimen
              - Torvoneustes
                - Torvoneustes coryphaeus
                - - cf. Torvoneustes
                  - - Torvoneustes sp.
                    - - Torvoneustes mexicanus
                      - - Torvoneustes jurensis
                        - Torvoneustes carpenteri

== Etymology ==
The type species of Plesiosuchus, Steneosaurus manselii, was first described and named by John Hulke in 1870. Richard Owen erected the genus Plesiosuchus for S. manselii in 1884 as he considered it to be more similar morphologically to extant crocodylians than to Steneosaurus. The generic name is derived from plesios (πλεσιος), "near" or "close to" in Ancient Greek, and suchus (συχος) which is the Latinised form of the Ancient Greek word for the crocodile god of ancient Egypt. The specific name, manselii, honors it discoverer, John Clavell Mansel-Pleydell. It is frequently misspelt in the literature, generally as manseli or mansellii.
