= Thomas Wills (minister) =

English evangelical preacher

Thomas Wills (1740–1802) was an English evangelical preacher, a priest of the Church of England who became a Dissenter.

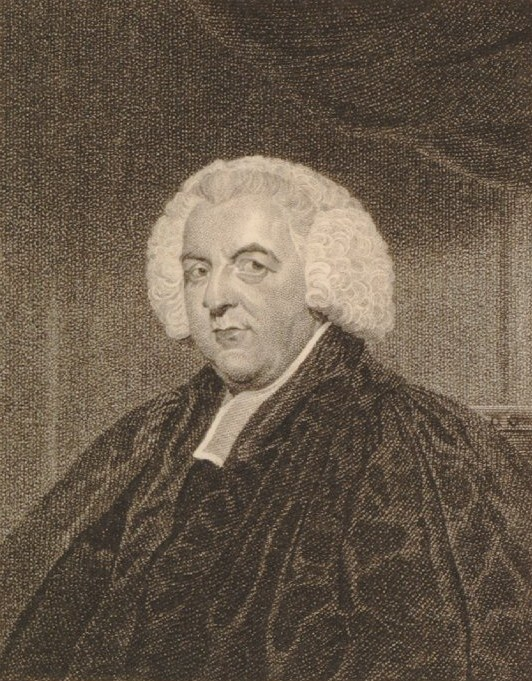
Thomas Wills

== Early life ==
Born at Truro, Cornwall, on 26 July 1740, he was the son of Thomas Wills of St. Issey and his wife Mary Spry; his mother and twin-sister died at his birth. The father died a year or two later. The two surviving sons were adopted by the eldest aunt, Lucy Spry of Truro, who died in 1755, leaving most of her fortune to Thomas. The elder boy, John Wills (d. 11 Oct. 1764), became a lieutenant in the navy under his relative Richard Spry. The younger son Thomas, after his aunt's death, was put under the care of her brother-in-law, Thomas Michell of Croft West, near Truro, and placed at Truro Grammar School, where he attended the ministry of Samuel Walker.

Wills matriculated at Magdalen Hall, Oxford, on 28 March 1757, and graduated B.A. 11 December 1760. While at the university he was on good terms with Thomas Haweis, and one of his religious associates. He was ordained deacon by the bishop of Oxford in 1762, and priest by the bishop of Exeter on Trinity Sunday 1764. In 1764 he was appointed to the curacy of Perranzabuloe and St Agnes, parishes on the north coast of Cornwall, of which James Walker, a brother of Samuel Walker, was vicar. His connection with Perranzabuloe ceased in 1765, but he remained at St. Agnes until January 1778.

== Calvinistic Methodist ==
In the autumn of 1772 Wills met Selina, Countess of Huntingdon at Bath and frequently preached in her chapel. Lady Huntingdon, his wife's aunt, visited them at St Agnes in the autumn of 1775, and established her chapels in Cornwall. Wills was appointed her chaplain in January 1778, and resigned his curacy. He went to Trevecca College, and then to Brighton. For his irregular conduct in preaching at the Spa Fields chapel in 1781 he was served with a citation by the Rev. William Sellon of St. James's, Clerkenwell. Next year he took the oath of allegiance as a dissenting minister, and was appointed minister of Spa Fields chapel. He officiated there and in chapels of Lady Huntingdon's Connexion throughout England for several years, and on 9 March 1783 he and another minister held the "primary ordination" of the Connexion in Spa Fields chapel. He took temporary leave of the congregation on 12 August 1787. Differences ensued between him and Lady Huntingdon, and he did not minister there again until 30 March 1788. He preached his last sermon in the chapel on 6 July 1788, and a few days later was dismissed by her.

== Later years ==
After preaching occasionally at Surrey Chapel and elsewhere Wills was engaged by the proprietors of Dr. Peckwell's chapel, in the Great Almonry at Westminster, and also by those of Orange Street chapel, Leicester Square, to officiate. The chapel at Silver Street, near Aldersgate Street, was let to him from Michaelmas 1789 for a lecture on Thursday evenings, and the following Christmas he took the building on lease. Its interior was then altered, and the liturgy of the English church, an organ, and the hymns of the Countess of Huntingdon were introduced. He ceased in 1789 to preach in Orange Street chapel, and in 1791 he gave up Westminster chapel; but in 1793 he began preaching in Islington chapel. There and at Silver Street chapel he remained preaching the doctrines of Calvinism for several years. Wills preached in the open air, also, especially on Tower Hill, attracting crowds.

About 1797 Wills's congregation dwindled, with the popularity of a rival preacher in Grub Street, John Bradford; and his own health began to decline. His mental faculties gave way, and in 1799 a stroke of paralysis incapacitated him from preaching. He took leave of his congregation at Silver Street on 23 February 1800, and retired to Boskenna in the parish of St Buryan, Cornwall, the seat of James Paynter. He died there on 12 May 1802, and was buried on the north side of the churchyard in a vaulted grave which he had constructed for himself and his wife. A monument to his memory was placed in the church by his widow, who died at Boskenna on 3 April 1814.

== Works ==
Wills was the author of:

- Remarks on Polygamy in answer to Madan's "Thelyphthora", 1781. Reply to Martin Madan.
- Authentic Narrative of the Primary Ordination in Lady Huntingdon's Chapel, 9 March 1783; 2nd ed. 1786.
- The Spiritual Register, 1784–95, 3 vols.; he had previously sent some of the cases to the Protestant Magazine.
- A Farewell Address to the Countess of Huntingdon's Chapels, and especially Spa Fields, 1788.

Wills also published sermons, and edited religious works, including Letters from the late Rev. William Romaine to a Friend, which passed through many editions.

== Family ==
On 6 October 1774 William married Selina Margaretta Wheler in Bath. She was third daughter of Granville Wheler of Otterden Place, near Faversham, Kent, by his wife, Lady Catherine Maria Hastings.

== Notes ==
Attribution

This article incorporates text from a publication now in the public domain: Lee, Sidney, ed. (1900). "Wills, Thomas". Dictionary of National Biography. Vol. 62. London: Smith, Elder & Co.
