= Henry George Keene (orientalist) =

Employee of the East India Company (1781–1864)

Henry George Keene (30 September 1781–29 January 1864) was an English employee of the East India Company, as soldier, civil servant, and orientalist. He was known as a Persian scholar, and also was a churchman and academic.

== Life ==
Born on 30 September 1781, Keene was the only son of Thomas Keene and a grandson of the architect Henry Keene; his mother was Jane, sister of George Harris, 1st Baron Harris. He was educated privately, partly by Jacques-François Menou.

Keene went to India as a cadet in the Madras Presidency army about 1798, and shortly after became adjutant of a sepoy regiment, which formed part of the brigade commanded by Colonel Arthur Wellesley. In May 1799 it took part in the siege of Seringapatam, where Keene led the company carrying the scaling-ladders for the storming party (4 May). In poor health, he obtained an appointment in the Madras civil service through his uncle, Lord Harris, the commander-in-chief, in February 1801. After a short visit to England he entered Fort William College in Calcutta, then newly established, for the training of young civil officers.

In January 1804 Keene passed out at Fort William in the first class. He had honours in Persian and Arabic, with prizes in classics, English composition, French, and gold medal in Islamic law, having held public disputations in Arabic and Persian. Joining the East India Company service at Madras, he became in turn registrar of the district court at Rajamundri, and assistant-registrar to the sudder courts at the presidency. In 1805 he went to Europe, and in 1809 returned to India, where he incurred the displeasure of Sir George Barlow, the governor. As a result, he gave up his post.

On 13 November 1811 Keene matriculated at Sidney Sussex College, Cambridge, where he graduated in 1815. Shortly afterwards he retired from the Indian civil service. He was admitted fellow of his college on 13 November 1817, and took holy orders, being ordained priest in 1819. At this period he visited the continent, in company with Philip Henry Stanhope, 4th Earl Stanhope, and met Archduke John of Austria and Joseph von Hammer-Purgstall, with both of whom he kept up a correspondence. In March 1819 he unsuccessfully contested Sir Thomas Adams's Chair of Arabic at Cambridge University.

In 1824 Keene became professor of Arabic and Persian at the East India College, Haileybury, where he was later appointed registrar. There his celebrity attracted visitors. In 1834 he resigned his posts at Haileybury, and went to live at Tunbridge Wells, where he spent the rest of his life. He died there on 29 January 1864.

== Works ==
Around 1804, in India, Keene wrote a book on law in Arabic, for which the British government awarded him 10,000 rupees. Other published works were:

- Akhlák-i-Mahsini, lithograph text and translation, and a book of the Anwár-i-Suhaili, also text and translation (Hertford)
- Persian Fables (London), 1833
- Persian Stories (London), 1835
- Sermons of Rev. W. Sharpe, with a memoir, 1836.
- Peepul Leaves: Poems Written in India, (London: W. H. Allen, 1879)
- The Turks in India : Critical Chapters on the Administration of That Country by the Chughtai, Bábar, and His Descendants, (London: W. H. Allen, 1879)
- The Moghul Empire : From the Death of Aurungzeb to the Overthrow of the Mahratta Power (London: W. H. Allen, 1883)
- Fifty-Seven : Some Account of the Administration in Indian Districts During the Revolt of the Bengal Army (London: W. H. Allen, 1883)

The Persian Fables were translated into Tamil in 1840, and a new edition was published in 1880 by his daughter Katharine.

Keene assisted his friend Adam Clarke in the philological part of his Commentary on the Bible. He stopped work on a Persian grammar, because Mirza Muhammed Ibrahim, his assistant, had written one, and never published his writing on Persian history.

He wrote three titles in Thacker's Hand-books of Hindostan, published by Thacker, Spink, & Co., Calcutta.

== Family ==
In 1824 Keene married Anne, daughter of Charles Apthorp Wheelwright, formerly of Boston, Massachusetts, a loyalist refugee. He left two sons and two daughters.

== Notes ==
Attribution

This article incorporates text from a publication now in the public domain: Lee, Sidney, ed. (1892). "Keene, Henry George". Dictionary of National Biography. Vol. 30. London: Smith, Elder & Co.
