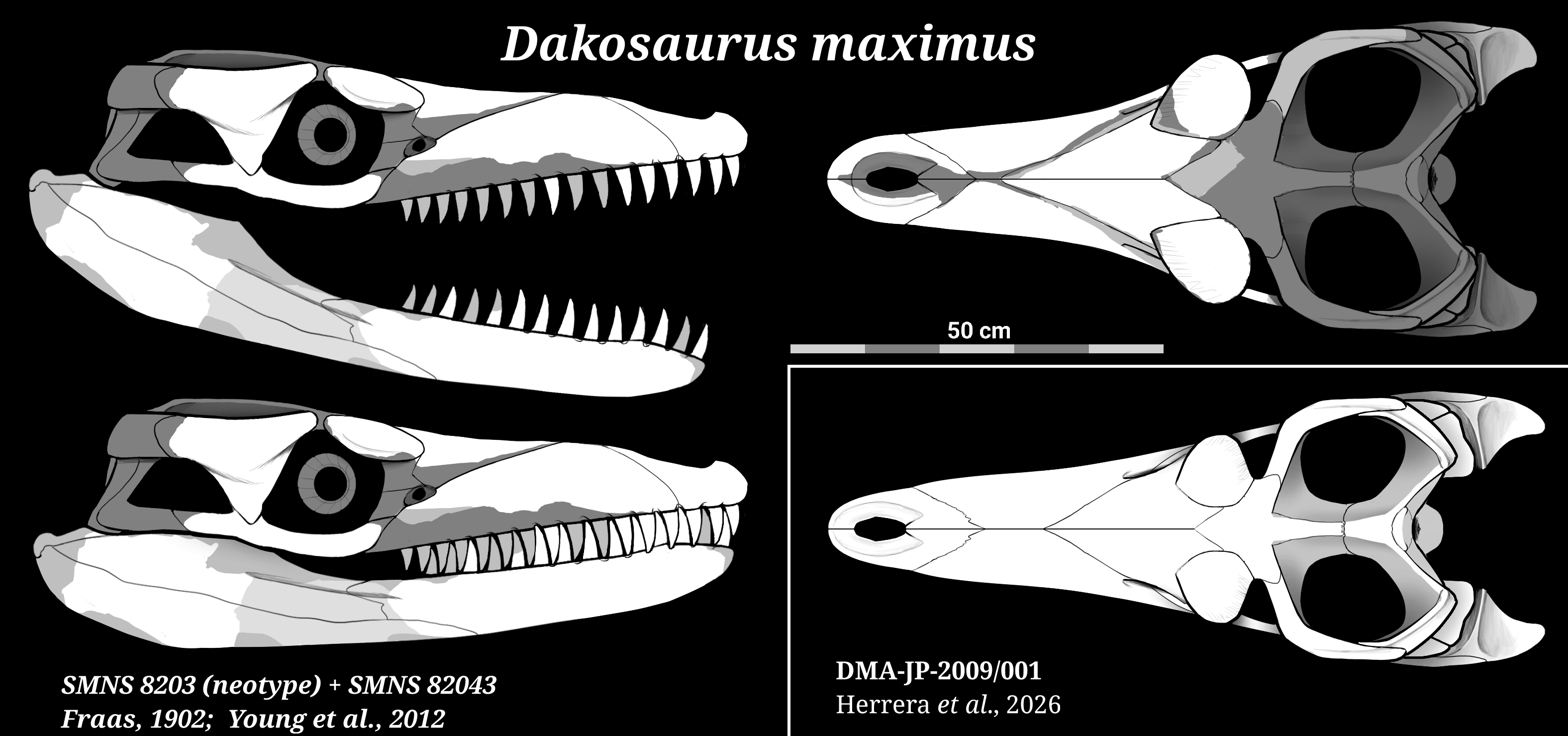
- Skull diagram of D. maximus
- Skull diagram of D. andiniensis

Scientific classification
- Kingdom: Animalia
- Phylum: Chordata
- Class: Reptilia
- Clade: Pseudosuchia
- Clade: Crocodylomorpha
- Suborder: †Thalattosuchia
- Family: †Metriorhynchidae
- Tribe: †Geosaurini
- Clade: †Dakosaurina
- Genus: †Dakosaurus von Quenstedt, 1856

Type species
- †Geosaurus maximus Plieninger, 1846

Species
- †Dakosaurus maximus (Plieninger, 1846); †Dakosaurus andiniensis Vignaud & Gasparini, 1996

Synonyms
- Dacosaurus Sauvage, 1873 (sic); Geosaurus maximus Plieninger, 1846; Megalosaurus schnaitheimi Bunzel, 1871 (partim)

= Dakosaurus =

Dakosaurus Temporal range: Late Jurassic - Early Cretaceous, 157–137 Ma

Metriorhynchid reptile genus from the Late Jurassic / Early Cretaceous period

Dakosaurus is an extinct genus of crocodylomorph within the family Metriorhynchidae that lived during the Late Jurassic and Early Cretaceous. It was large, with teeth that were serrated and compressed lateromedially (flattened from side to side). The genus was established by Friedrich August von Quenstedt in 1856 for an isolated tooth named Geosaurus maximus by Theodor Plieninger in 1846. Dakosaurus was a carnivore that spent much, if not all, of its life out at sea. The extent of its adaptation to a marine lifestyle means that it is most likely that it mated at sea, but since no eggs or nests have been discovered that have been referred to Dakosaurus, whether it gave birth to live young at sea like dolphins and ichthyosaurs or came ashore like turtles is not known yet. The name Dakosaurus means "biter lizard", and is derived from the Greek dakos ("biter") and σαῦρος -sauros ("lizard").

== Discovery and species ==
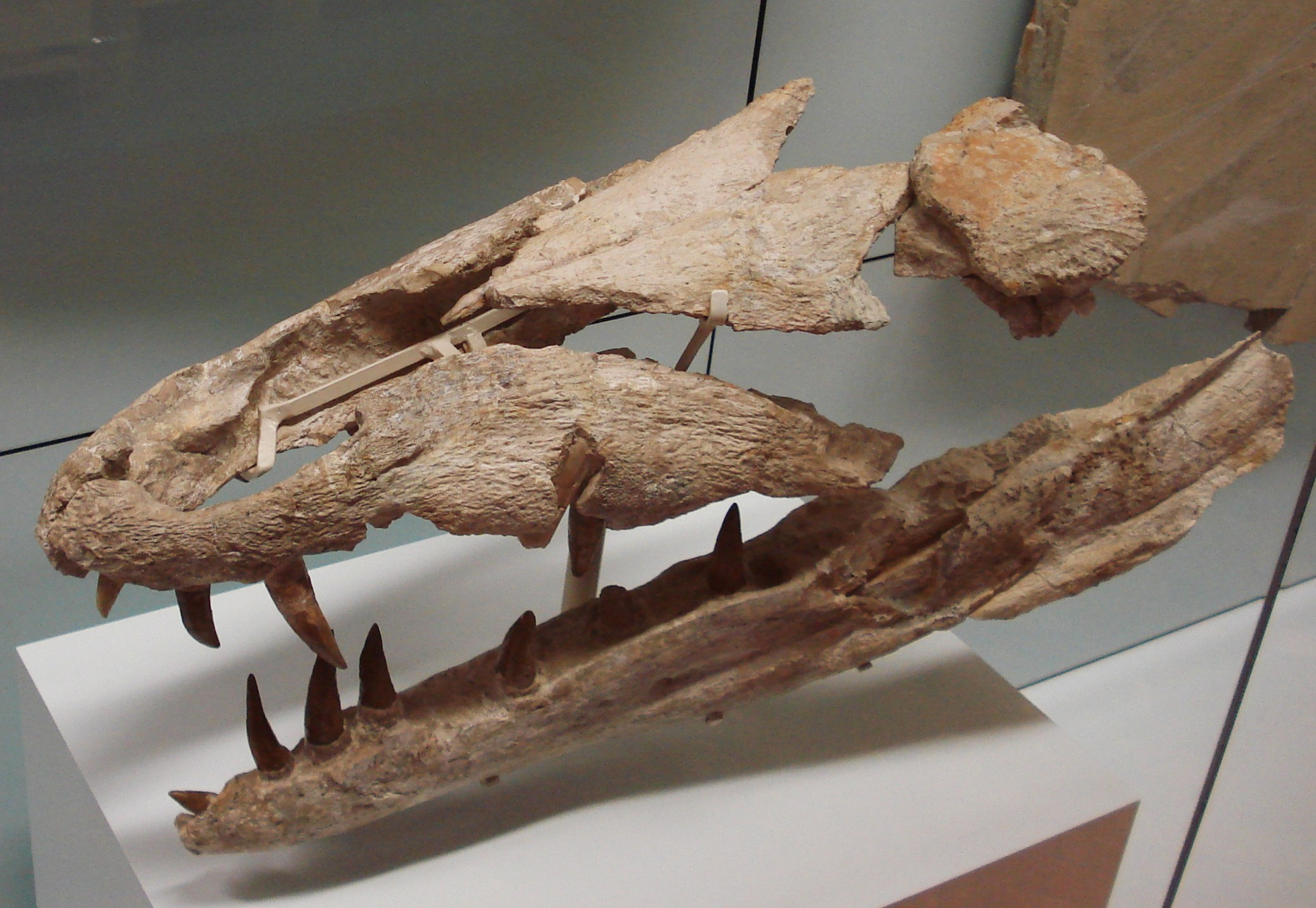
Part of the skull of D. maximus' neotype SMNS 8203, Staatliches Museum für Naturkunde Stuttgart

The type species Dakosaurus maximus, meaning "greatest biter lizard", is known from fossil discoveries in Western Europe (England, France, Switzerland and Germany) of the Late Jurassic (Late Kimmeridgian-Early Tithonian).

When isolated Dakosaurus teeth were first discovered in Germany, they were mistaken for belonging to the theropod dinosaur Megalosaurus. The type species D. maximus was originally named as a species of Geosaurus in 1846 by Theodor Plieninger, creating the species G. maximus.

In 1856 von Quenstedt made Plieninger's Geosaurus maximus teeth a new genus with the name Dakosaurus. He explained the etymology as Greek dakos "Biss" [bite] in 1858 in German, adding "denn wenige kommen seinem furchtbaren Gebiss gleich" [for few can match its terrible set of teeth]. He gave the meaning of Greek dakos more correctly as "Beisser" [biter] in another description in 1859 in which he classified Dakosaurus as a dinosaur.

Named in 1871 by Emanuel Bunzel, the remains attributed to Megalosaurus schnaitheimi (found in Schnaitheim, Germany) are now believed to have belonged to Dakosaurus maximus as per Carrano et al. (2012).

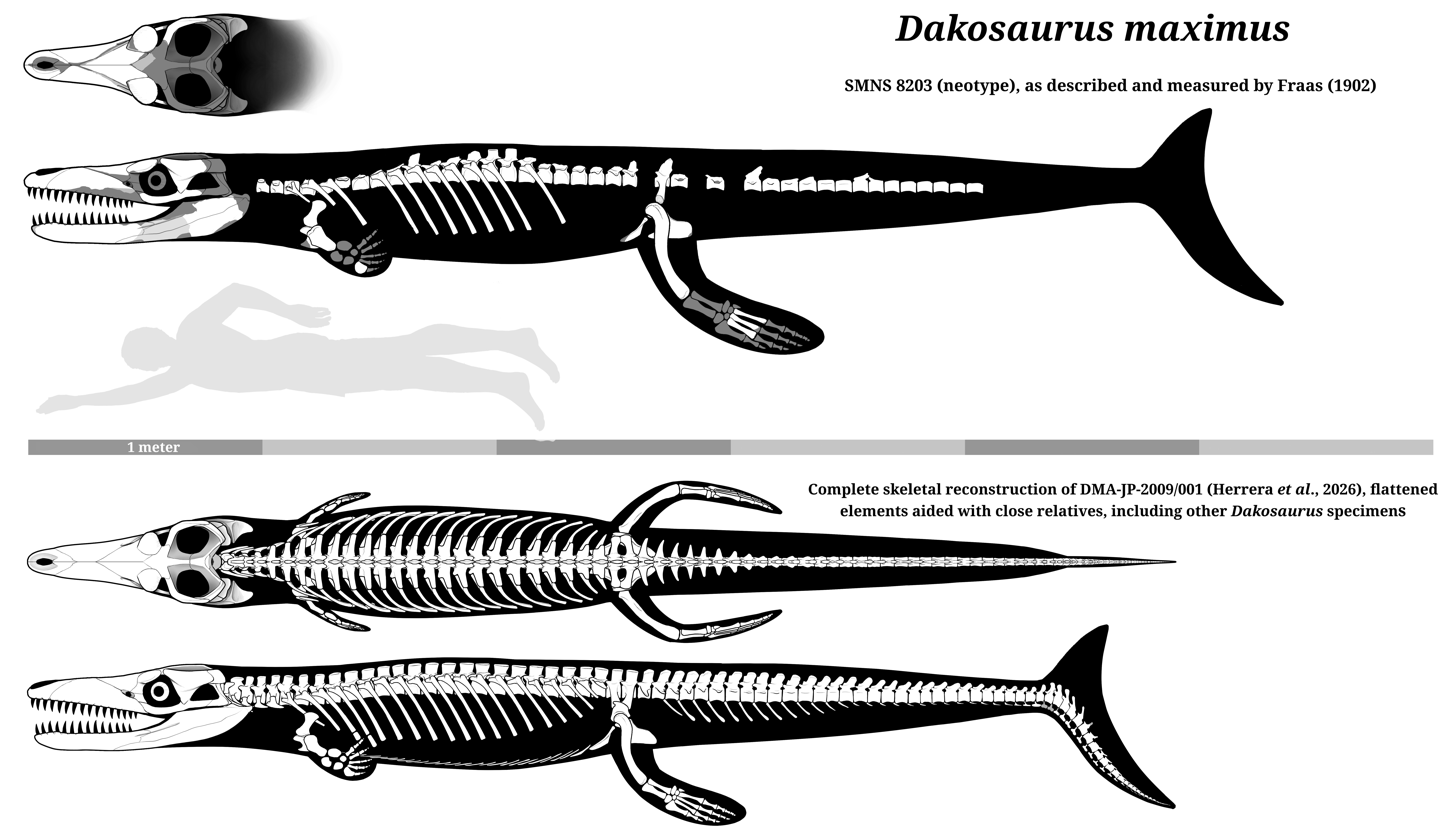
Skeletal reconstruction and size comparison of D. maximus

Fossil specimens referrable to Dakosaurus are known from Late Jurassic deposits from England, France, Switzerland, Germany, Poland, Russia, Argentina, and Mexico. Teeth referrable to Dakosaurus are known from Europe from the Oxfordian.

Dacosaurus (Sauvage, 1873) is a misspelling of Dakosaurus, and thus a synonym.

Dakosaurus andiniensis, meaning "biter lizard from the Andes", was first reported in 1985 from the Neuquén Basin, a very rich fossil bed in the Vaca Muerta, Argentina. However, it was not until 1996 that the binomen Dakosaurus andiniensis was erected. Two later discovered skulls, the specimina MOZ 6146P and MOZ 6140P, have indicated that D. andiniensis is unique among the metriorhynchids (the family of stem-crocodilians most specialised for marine life) with its short, tall snout, which lent it the popular nickname "Godzilla" in press reports about its description. This species has a fossil range from the late Jurassic to early Cretaceous (Late Tithonian-Early Berriasian).

Size comparison of D. andiniensis

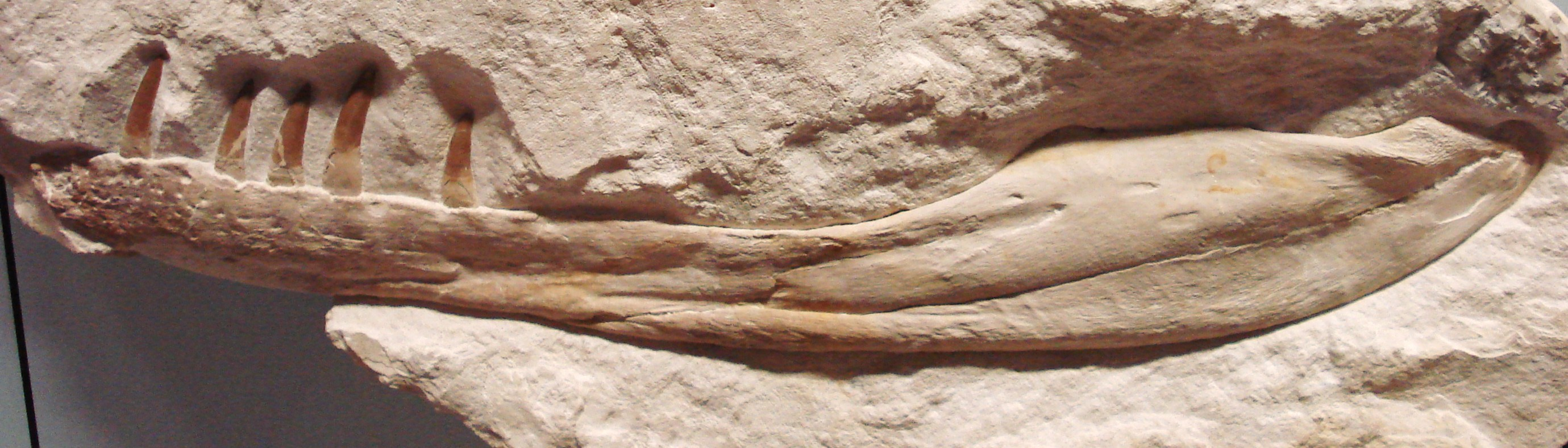
D. maximus specimen SMNS 82043.

Dakosaurus nicaeensis, named in 1913 by Ambayrac, was mistakenly classified as a megalosaurid dinosaur; now it is assigned as the sole species in the genus Aggiosaurus. Buffetaut in 1982 demonstrated that it was in fact a metriorhynchid, closely related to, if not a member of Dakosaurus. As the type specimen is poorly preserved it is considered nomen dubium.

Incomplete skull specimens of Dakosaurus have been discovered in Kimmeridgian age rocks from Mexico; they have not yet been referred to a specific species of Dakosaurus.

== Description ==
All currently known species would have been large, measuring approximately 4–5 m (13–16 ft) long, with skull and jaws approaching 1 m (3.3 ft) in length. Its body was streamlined for greater hydrodynamic efficiency, which along with its downturned tail supporting a large fin (known from soft-tissue impression on relatives) made it a more efficient swimmer than modern crocodilian species. As with other metriorhynchids, the forelimbs were extremely reduced, the hindlimbs underwent a similar process, but the femur was still relatively large and robust, with that of a complete specimen described in 2026 being 32cm, and the one on the neotype measuring 43cm in length.

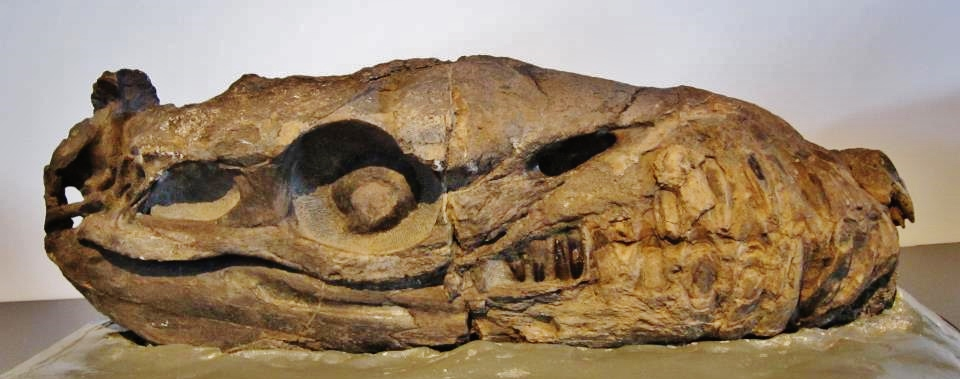
Skull of Dakosaurus andiniensis (museo de Zapala, Argentina.)

As in the closely-related Geosaurus, the skull of dakosaurus was comparatively shorter and more robust than those of most metriorhynchids, which is more pronounced on the argentinian species (D. andiniensis). In dorsal view, it is triangular in shape, with a much wider posterior portion, showcasing large supratemporal fenestrae which would've housed strong jaw adductor musculature for a stronger bite-force.

=== Teeth ===
The teeth of Dakosaurus are characteristic in being large and few in number, compared to its relatives. As evidenced by occlussion notches on the jaws and articulated skulls, the teeth interlocked in a fashion analogous to gharials and killer whales when the mouth was closed, as in other metriorhynchids. Wear facets also indicate the teeth contacted against, and grinded each other down, likely a flesh-shearing adaptation for a macroredatory diet.

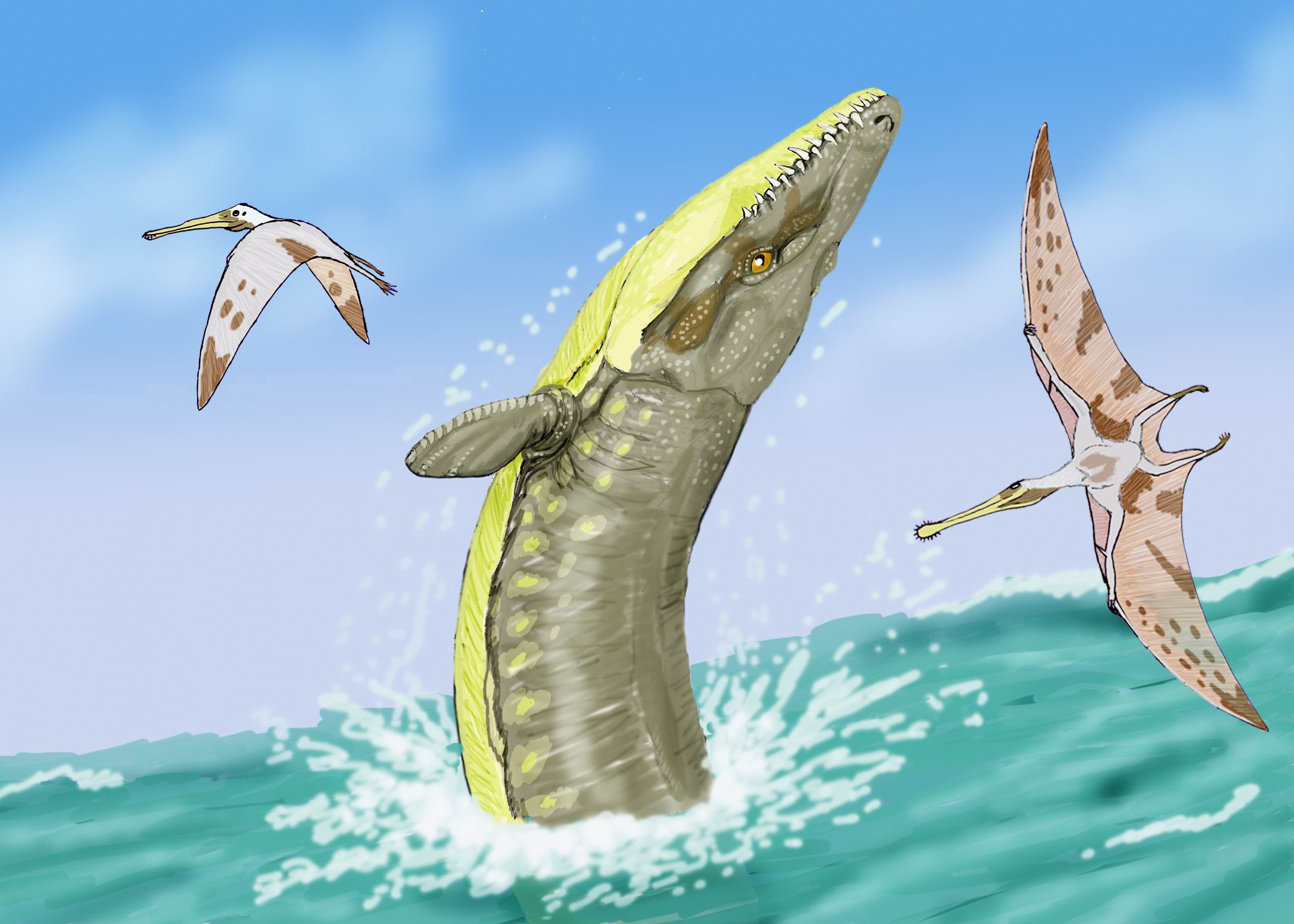
D. maximus leaping after two Gnathosaurus

=== Salt glands ===
The incomplete skull specimens from the Argentinian species of Dakosaurus preserves the chamber in which the well-developed salt glands (known from Geosaurus and Metriorhynchus) would have been housed, and similarly enlarged peorbital fossae are present in other specimens. Unfortunately, there was no preservational evidence of the glands themselves.

== Classification ==
Dakosaurus–when it contained the species D. andiniensis, D. maximus, and D. manselii–had long been considered paraphyletic, that is, not consisting of a common ancestor and its descendants, until a 2012 study moved D. manselii to the formerly invalid genus Plesiosuchus.

- - Metriorhynchidae
    - Metriorhynchinae
    - Geosaurinae
      - Plesiosuchus manselii
      - Torvoneustes carpenteri
      - - - Dakosaurus andiniensis
          - Dakosaurus maximus
        - - Geosaurus

Herrera, Spindler and Bronzati (2026) rediscribed Dakosaurus based on a well preserved specimen from the German Kimmeridgian aged Torliete Formation and ran several phylogenetic analysis based on the data from the new specimen. A simplified version of the reduced strict consensus tree using the full dataset is given below:

- Metriorhynchidae
  - Metriorhynchinae
  - Geosaurinae
    - - 'Metriorhynchus' westermanni
      - 'Metriorhynchus' casamiquelai
    - - 'Metriorhynchus' brachyrhynchus
      - Neptunidraco ammoniticus
      - - Tyrannoneustes lythrodectikos
        - - - Ieldraan melkshamensis
            - Geosaurus spp.
          - - - Plesiosuchus manselii
              - Suchodus durobrivensis
            - - Mr Leeds Dakosaur
              - - Dakosaurus maximus
                - 'Dakosaurus' andiniensis
          - - Purranisaurus potens
            - - - Torvoneustes coryphaeus
                - - Torvoneustes mexicanus
                  - Torvoneustes carpenteri
                  - cf. Torvoneustes
              - - Swiss Rostrum (NMO 26589)
                - - Mr Passmores specimen
                  - Chouquet cf. hassifer
                  - English Rostrum (CAMSM_J18212)

== Palaeobiology and palaeoecology ==
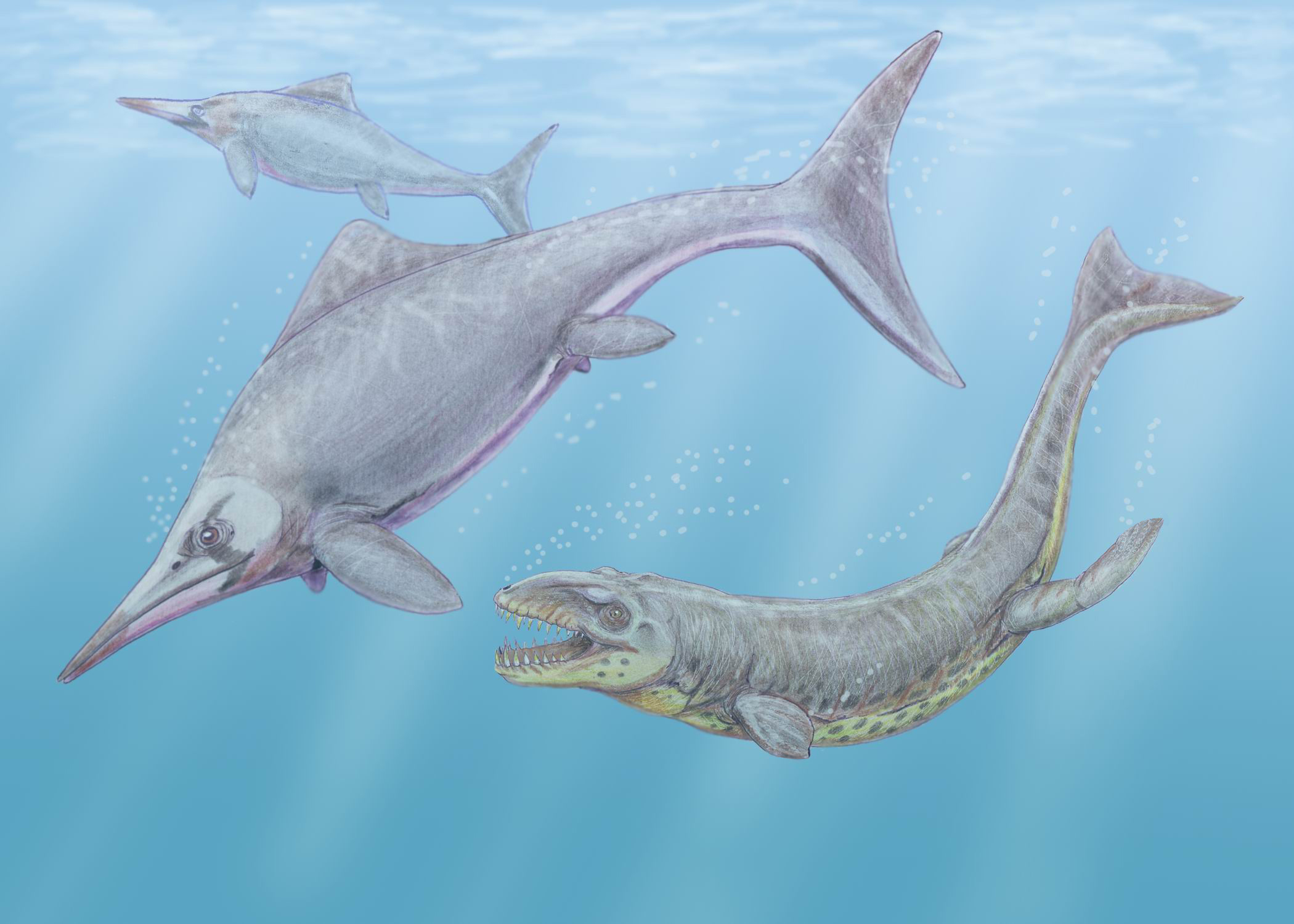
D. andiniensis harassing a Caypullisaurus

Dakosaurus maximus is one of several species of metriorhynchids known from the Altmühltal Formation (Solnhofen limestone, early Tithonian) of Bavaria, Germany. Alongside three other metriorhynchid species, it has been hypothesised that niche partitioning enabled several species of crocodyliforms to co-exist. Dakosaurus and Geosaurus giganteus would have been top predators of this Formation, both of which were large, short-snouted species with serrated teeth. The remaining two species (Cricosaurus elegans and Rhacheosaurus gracilis) and the teleosaurid Aeolodon would have fed mostly on fish.

From the slightly older Nusplingen Limestone (late Kimmeridgian) of southern Germany, both D. maximus and C. suevicus are contemporaneous. As with Solnhofen, Dakosaurus was the top predator, while C. suevicus was a fish-eater.

A 2026 study which redescribed the phylogenetic affinites of Dakosaurus also described a new specimen of D. maximus from the Kimmeridgian Torleite Formation of Germany, and report evidence of preservation of cartilaginous fish (likely hybodontiform) remains within the specimen's abdominal region.

== See also ==
- List of marine reptiles
