= William Dealtry =

William Dealtry (1775–1847) was an English clergyman of evangelical views, who became archdeacon of Surrey and a Fellow of the Royal Society.

== Life ==
He was the younger son of an old Yorkshire family, from whom he inherited at his father's death a small landed property. He entered St Catharine Hall, Cambridge, when quite young, and soon migrated to Trinity College. He was second wrangler and second Smith's prizeman in 1796, and a fellow of Trinity from 1798 until his marriage in 1814. He proceeded M.A. in 1799, B.D. in 1812, and D.D. in 1829.

He held for some years the living of Watton-at-Stone in Hertfordshire. In 1802 he was moderator in the examinations of the university. On the foundation of the East India College in Hertfordshire (Haileybury) he was appointed professor of mathematics. He was elected a Fellow of the Royal Society in 1811.

In 1813, on the death of the Rev. John Venn, Dealtry was made rector of Clapham. Belonging to the evangelical party in the Church of England, he took part in the controversy which arose on the formation in 1810–12 of the British and Foreign Bible Society, which he supported.

On 25 February 1830 Dealtry received a prebendal stall at Winchester Cathedral, and was made chancellor of the diocese; in 1845 he was appointed archdeacon of Surrey. He died at Brighton on 15 October 1847.

== Works ==
In 1810 Dealtry published The Principles of Fluxions, a textbook. He also published sermons, charges and pamphlets and a book, A review of Mr. Norris's Attack upon the British and Foreign Bible Society, John Hatchard, London, 1815.
