= Charles Stewart (orientalist) =

British orientalist who served in the Bengal Army

Charles Stewart (1764–1837), was a British orientalist who served in the Bengal Army from 1781 until 1808. He was assistant-professor of Persian at Fort William College, Calcutta from 1800 until 1806, while from 1807 until 1827, he was professor of Arabic, Persian, and Hindustani language at the East India College in Haileybury, India. During this time, he edited and translated oriental works.

== Biography ==
Stewart was the eldest son of Poyntz Stewart, captain 1st regiment, of Lisburn, county Antrim, was born in 1764. In 1781 he entered the East India Company's Bengal Army as cadet, and left it with the rank of major in 1808. On the foundation of the Fort William College, Calcutta in 1800, he was appointed assistant professor of Persian, but in 1806 returned to England, and in the following year was appointed to the professorship (which he retained until 1827), of Arabic, Persian, and Hindustani in the East India College, Haileybury. He died at Bath on 19 April 1837. He was a member of the Royal Academy of Sciences of Munich and other learned bodies, and in 1831 received the gold medal of the Oriental Translation Fund.

== Family ==
Stewart married, first, Amelia, daughter of Sir W. Gordon of Embo, bart., and, secondly, in 1828, Anne, daughter of the Rev. Nicholas Holland, rector of Stifford, and widow of J. Reid, esq., of Calcutta, but had no children.

== Bibliography ==
He wrote:

- The Anvari Soohyly of Hussein Vaiz Kashify, published by Moolvey Hussein and Captain C. S., Calcutta, 1804, fol.
- A Descriptive Catalogue of the Oriental Library of the late Tippoo Sultan of Mysore, to which are prefixed Memoirs of Hyder Aly and his Son, Tippoo Sultan, Cambridge, 1809, 4to.
- Abu Taleb Khan's Travels in Europe and Asia, edited by his Son, Mirza Hasein Ali, translated, London, 1810, 2 vols. 8vo; 1814, 3 vols. 12mo.
- The History of Bengal, from the first Mohammedan Invasion until 1757, London, 1813, 4to.
- An Introduction to the Anvari Soohyly, London, 1821, 4to.
- Seventh Chapter of Anvari Soohyly, with an English Translation and Analysis of all the Arabic Words, London, 1821, 4to.
- Original Persian Letters and other Documents, compiled and translated, London, 1825, 4to.
- The Mulfuzāt Timury, or Autobiographical Memoirs of the Moghul Emperor Timur, translated, London, 1830, 4to (Oriental Translation Fund).
- The Tezkereh al Vakiāt, or Private Memoirs of the Moghul Emperor Humayūn, by Jouher, translated, London, 1832, 4to (Oriental Translation Fund).
- Biographical Sketch of the Emperor Jehángir (explanatory of a painting presented to the Royal Asiatic Society by C. S.), pamphlet, 8vo, n. d.
