= Truro Cathedral School =

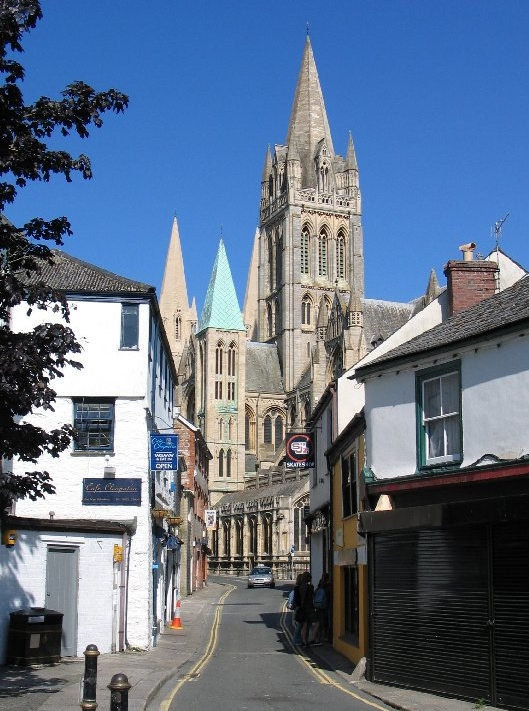
- Truro Cathedral, with the nave of the former St Mary's church on the near side
- Truro, Cornwall, TR1; England

Information
- Type: Independent; Day and boarding
- Religious affiliation: Church of England
- Established: 1549
- Closed: 1982
- Last chairman of governors: George Boscawen, 9th Viscount Falmouth
- Last headmaster: J. C. Wolters
- Gender: Boys
- Age: 7 to 18
- Enrolment: 321 (1968)
- Houses: Trewinnard Court (for boarders)
- Former pupils: Old Truronians

Truro Cathedral School was a Church of England school for boys in Truro, Cornwall. An ancient school refounded in 1549 as the Truro Grammar School, after the establishment of Truro Cathedral in the last quarter of the 19th century it was responsible for educating the cathedral's choristers and became known as the Cathedral School.

The school closed in July 1982 and the education of choristers was transferred to Polwhele House Preparatory School.

== History ==
An ancient foundation, the school existed before the Reformation as the chantry school of St Mary's Church, Truro. In 1549, following Edward VI's Dissolution of Colleges Act 1547 which suppressed all chantries, the school was refounded and took on a new identity as Truro Grammar School. However, as reported by Nicholas Carlisle in his survey of 1818, "The Grammar School at Truro owes its origin and endowment to some benevolent person, whose name is now not known." The best evidence of the refounding of the school is an entry in the Journal of the House of Commons dated 21 May 1689, which refers to the grammar school being founded by a deed, since lost, of the third year of King Edward VI.

In 1767, the Rev. St John Eliot, a former Rector of Truro, founded two Exhibitions tenable only at Exeter College, Oxford, worth £30 a year each, with preference to be given to boys from the school. In 1818 Carlisle reported that over the previous ten years the number of scholars had been about fifty and that

The School is a venerable Structure, 42 feet in length by 28 feet in breadth, and 18 1/2 feet in height to the ceiling, with pillars and pilasters of the Corinthian order. Adjoining, is a Library, filled with excellent editions of the Classics and other valuable Works, which are under the sole control of the Master... The Eton Latin and Greek Grammars are at present in use; and the system of Education is similar to that of ETON COLLEGE.

In the early 19th century an "anniversary school meeting" took place on every second Thursday in September, being a gathering of the school's former pupils. Cyrus Redding, in his An Illustrated Itinerary of the County of Cornwall (1842) called Truro Grammar School "the most celebrated school in the county".

With the creation of the Diocese of Truro in 1876 from the Cornish part of the old Diocese of Exeter, the 16th-century parish church of St Mary's was designated as a cathedral. The church was then partly demolished and partly incorporated into the new neo-Gothic Truro Cathedral, built on the same site. The pupils of the old grammar school had worshipped at St Mary's and became responsible for providing the new cathedral's choristers. It thus began to be known as the "Cathedral School".

In 1906 the school was established as Truro Cathedral School by the Dean and Chapter as a Church of England public school. By the early 20th century the school was a private school and had a boarding house called Trewinnard Court. The buildings were designed by the cathedral architect F. L. Pearson and built in the precincts of the cathedral. In 1925 the headmaster resided at Trewinnard Court. At that time choristers paid no tuition fees and there were two Bray scholarships open to choristers worth £30 p.a. The Hawkins scholarship worth £80 p.a. was open to former pupils studying at a university and tenable for three years. By the 1920s the cathedral school's reputation had significantly increased.

During the Second World War, the school took the junior boys evacuated from St Paul's, London, some of whom joined the Truro Cathedral choir.

In 1949, the school was occupying Copeland Court, Kenwyn, formerly the bishop's palace known as 'Lis Escop'. Until 1960, the school had a large building in the Cathedral Close. In 1968 the school's age range was from seven to eighteen. There were 212 day boys and 109 boarders. Of these, twenty-two were cathedral choristers.

In 1974 the school was teaching Cornish wrestling as part of its physical education programme and was the only school in Cornwall to do so. In 1979 it was reported to provide "continuous education for boys from 7–18 either as boarders or as day boys".

== Closure and aftermath ==
The Times reported on 19 April 1982 that Viscount Falmouth, the chairman of the school's governing body, had written to parents to break the news that the school would close at the end of that year's Summer term. The stated reason was "deteriorating finances", and Lord Falmouth said in his letter that the decision had been taken "with very great reluctance, after exploring all possible alternatives and after considering professional advice". John Wolters, the headmaster, wrote separately to parents to say that the school would help to find places for its boys in other schools. The other members of staff responded by issuing a statement on 18 April to say they were hoping the school could continue, "if necessary on a reconstituted basis".

Reasons which have since been suggested for the closure include a lack of modern facilities, the economic downturn of the early 1980s, and the changing priorities of leaders of the Church of England, which owned the school buildings. George Eustice, an old boy of the school, has said he suspects the Church may have wished to close the school to raise funds for repairing the roof of Truro Cathedral.

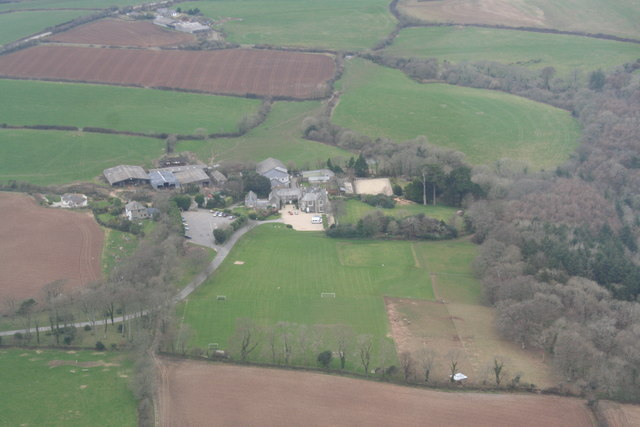
Polwhele House School

A limited liability company called Truro Cathedral School Ltd was incorporated on 21 November 1960 and is still in existence. The school's task of providing the cathedral's choristers has been transferred to the neighbouring Polwhele House Preparatory School, and the number of choristers is now eighteen.

The former school building in the Cathedral Close is now called "Old Cathedral School" and is currently an office building; it was used as such by the Cornwall Council unitary authority until the council gave it up. The building is still owned by the cathedral. The Cornwall Record Office holds the school's archives, including "lists of masters, pupils and benefactors" dating between 1612 and 1876 and the governors' cash books from 1882 to 1984.

== Notable former pupils ==
See also Category:People educated at Truro Cathedral School

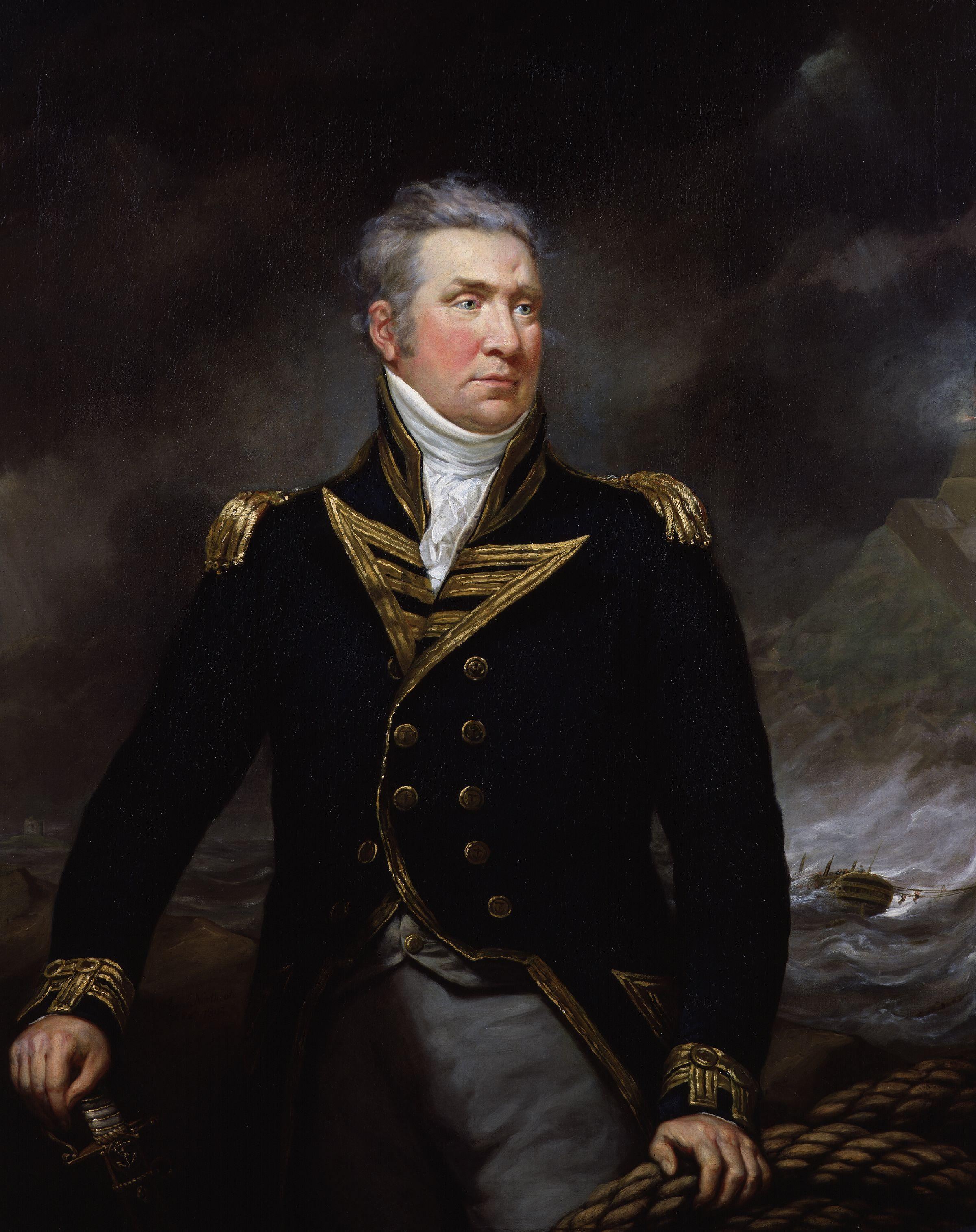
Admiral Lord Exmouth by James Northcote

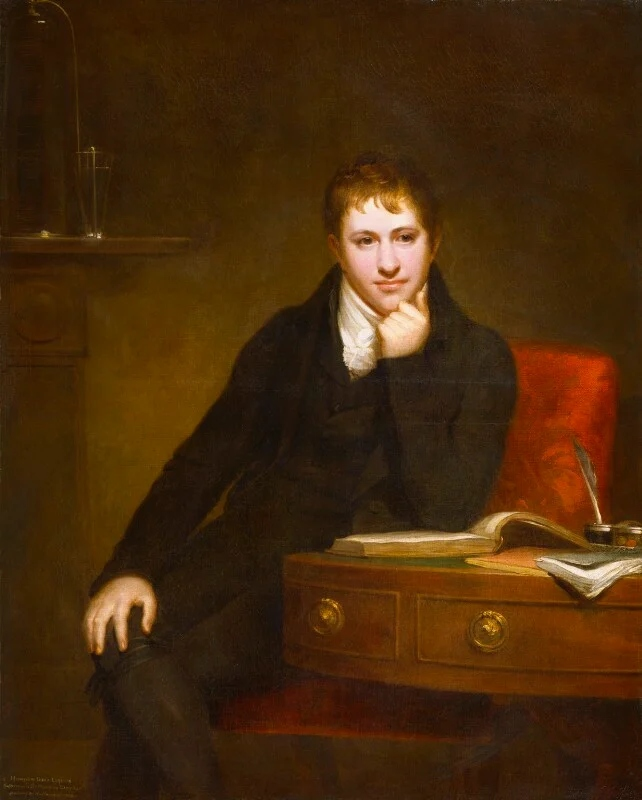
Sir Humphry Davy by Henry Howard, 1803

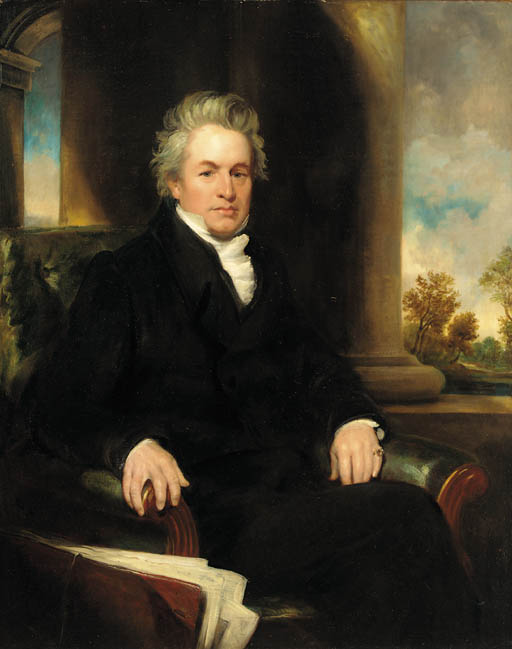
Pascoe Grenfell by Martin Archer Shee

Those educated at the school are known as "Old Truronians" and include (in chronological order):

- Sir Edmund Prideaux (died 1659), Roundhead, member of parliament for Lyme Regis, and Solicitor General
- Samuel Enys (1611–1697), Royalist and member of parliament for Penryn
- Swete Nicholas Archer, High Sheriff of Cornwall, 1757
- Admiral Sir Richard Spry (1715–1775), Royal Navy Commander-in-Chief, North America and West Indies Station and Mediterranean Fleet
- Samuel Foote (1720–1777), actor and playwright
- Thomas Haweis (1734–1820), clergyman
- Thomas Wills (1740–1802), minister
- William Macarmick (1742–1815), member of parliament and Lieutenant-Governor of Cape Breton Colony
- John Vivian (1750–1826), Vice-Warden of the Stannaries of Cornwall
- Jonathan Hornblower (1753–1815), pioneer of steam power
- Colonel John Lemon (1754–1814), Whig member of parliament for Truro
- Admiral Edward Pellew, 1st Viscount Exmouth (1757–1833), naval commander of the Napoleonic Wars
- Francis Gregor of Trewarthenick (1760–1815), knight of the shire for Cornwall
- The Rev. Richard Polwhele (1760–1838), poet and topographer
- Pascoe Grenfell (1761–1838), member of parliament
- Thomas Tregenna Biddulph (1763–1838), clergyman
- Lieutenant General Hussey Vivian, 1st Baron Vivian (1775–1842), Peninsular War commander
- Joseph Batten DD FRS (1778–1837), principal of the East India Company College
- Sir Humphry Davy (1778–1829), chemist and inventor
- Henry Martyn (1781–1812), Anglican missionary
- Fortescue Hichins (1784–1814) poet and historian
- Thomas Turner (1793–1873), surgeon
- Nicholas Michell (1807–1880), poet
- Walter Hawken Tregellas (1831–1894), author
- Francis Charles Hingeston-Randolph (1833–1910), clergyman and antiquary
- O. W. Tancock (1839–1930), clergyman and author
- Arthur Williams (1899–1974), Church of England clergyman
- Gerald Hocken Knight (1908–1979), organist
- David Mudd (1933–2020), Conservative member of parliament for Falmouth and Camborne
- Christopher J. Turner (1933–2014), diplomat and Governor of Montserrat
- Andrew Graham (born 1942), former Master of Balliol College, Oxford
- Peter Grimwade (1942–1990), television writer and director
- Nick Darke (1948–2005), playwright
- Roger Taylor (born 1949) drummer of the band Queen
- George Eustice (born 1971), member of Parliament for Camborne and Redruth

== Masters and headmasters ==
Until the nineteenth century, the school usually had only one professional schoolmaster, called "the master". Once it needed more staff the title became "headmaster".

- 1600–1609: John Hodge
- 1609–1612: Thomas Syms
- 1612–1618: Matthew Sharrock
- 1618–1620: Nicholas Upcot
- 1621–1635: Rev. George Fitzpen (or Phippen)
- 1635–1666: William White
- 1666–1685: Richard Jago
- 1685–1693: Henry Greenfield
- 1693–1698: Simon Paget
- 1698–1706: John Hillman
- 1706–1728: Thomas Hankyn & Joseph Jane
- 1728–1771: George Conon
- 1771–1804: Dr Cornelius Cardew (DD, Oxon)
- 1805– : Thomas Hogg
- 1891–1896: Rev. Thomas Fisher Maddrell, MA (Cantab.)
- 1897–1901: Rev. Francis George Elwes Field, MA (Cantab.)
- 1937–1973: Max Stanley Mischler, MA (Oxon.) (1910–1995)
- 1974–1979: F. S. G. Pearson, MA (Oxon.) (1935–2012)
- 1979–1982: John C. Wolters, MA (Cantab.)

== Old Truronians Association ==
An Old Truronians Association brings together former pupils of the school and continues to hold an annual dinner.
