= Tazkirat-ul-Waqiat =

Book written by Emperor Humayun's servant, Jawhar Aftabchi

- Author: Jawhar Aftabchi
- Original title: تذکرۃ الواقعات
- Translator: English: Charles Stewart (1832); Urdu: Ahmad-ud-Din Ahmad (1951); Urdu: Syed Moinul Haq (1955)
- Language: Persian
- Subject: Memoirs of Jawhar Aftabchi
- Genre: History, Biography
- Publication date: 995 AH (1586 CE)
- Publication place: Mughal Empire
- English publication date: 1832

Tazkirat-ul-Waqiat or Humayun Nama is a book written by Emperor Humayun's servant, Jawhar Aftabchi, in 995 AH / 1586 CE or 1587 CE, under the orders of Emperor Akbar. Jawhar Aftabchi served Humayun for many years, making this book a credible historical source about Humayun's life.

== Author ==
The author of Tazkirat-ul-Waqiat, Jawhar Aftabchi, was not a prominent figure in the historical world, nor was he an experienced historian. Consequently, little is known about his life. From the contents of this book, it is evident that despite holding a modest position, he had the special trust of Humayun. Towards the end of the book, it is mentioned that during the reconquest of India, Humayun appointed Jawhar as the revenue collector of Pargana Haibatpur.

== Subject ==
In this book, Aftabchi records firsthand accounts and events from Humayun's life. He wrote it in the Persian language. Before the arrival of the Britishers, Persian was used in the Indian subcontinent for court affairs and as a written language. In Afghanistan, it is called Dari, as it was the language of the court. The book also details Humayun's efforts to meet with Maldeo and the hardships he faced in the desert regions of Marwar, Bikaner, and Jaisalmer.

In one account, Aftabchi explains the challenges faced by Humayun at the Safavid court, such as the attempts to have him wear the Safavid taj headdress, or the riding of an unbroken horse to determine Humayun's fortune: "The emperor got on the unbroken colt, and when he mounted the horse was calm, and so the Turcomans [Safavids] tested and found this emperor's fortune to be strong".
