= Jawhar Aftabchi =

Biographer of Mughal emperor Humayun

- Occupations: Historian, Servant, Advisor
- Known for: Author of "Tazkirat-ul-Waqiat"
- Notable work: Tazkirat-ul-Waqiat
- Title: Mehtar (Honorary title)

Jawhar Aftabchi (Persian: جوهر آفتابچی) was an aftabah-bearer and servant of the Mughal Emperor Humayun. He also held several official positions during Humayun's reign. He is best known for authoring the Tazkirat-ul-Waqiat.

== Biography ==
Information about Jawhar's life is scarce, with most of the available details found within the pages of the Tazkirat-ul-Waqiat. Beyond these accounts, there is little reliable information about his personal history. Jawhar served faithfully under Nasiruddin Muhammad Humayun through both the heights of the emperor's power and his periods of exile and decline. He was considered one of Humayun's trusted confidants, and his advice was regarded as valuable. In recognition of his loyalty and service, Humayun conferred upon him the honorary title of "Mehtar" (chief).

Jawhar began his career as an employee in the royal stables before becoming an Aftabah (ewer-bearer) in Humayun's personal service. His dedication was rewarded in 962 AH (1554 or 1555 CE), when he was appointed revenue officer of the Heibatpur pargana. Later, he was entrusted with the administration of several villages in the jagīr (land grant) of Tatar Khan Lodhi. During his tenure, he settled outstanding debts owed to local Afghans by the state treasury, thereby securing the release of Afghan women and children who had been pledged as collateral. This act of integrity and compassion earned Humayun's admiration, and Jawhar was promoted to the position of treasurer for the provinces of Punjab and Multan.

The exact date of Jawhar Aftabchi's death is unknown. However, records indicate that he was alive during the reign of Emperor Akbar, Humayun's son. At Akbar's request, he compiled the Tazkirat-ul-Waqiat in 995 AH (1586 CE). Following Humayun's death, Jawhar gradually receded from public life and into obscurity.
