= James Jeremie =

English scholar (1802–1872)

James Amiraux Jérémie (12 April 1802, Saint Peter Port, Guernsey – 11 June 1872, Lincoln, England) was Professor of Classical Literature at The East India Company College 1830–50, Regius Professor of Divinity at the University of Cambridge from 1850, and Dean of Lincoln.

He was educated at Elizabeth College in Guernsey, and then at Blundell's School in Tiverton, before going to Trinity College, Cambridge. Jeremie was appointed Professor of Classical and General Literature at the East India Company College in 1830, a post he resigned in 1850 when he was chosen Regius Professor of Divinity at Cambridge University. Lord Palmerston made him Dean of Lincoln in 1864, but he retained his Regius chair for six more years. Jeremie died unmarried, and was buried in his native Guernsey.

A lithograph portrait of Jeremie by G. B. Black is in the collection of the British Library.

Academic offices
Preceded by Alfred Ollivant	Regius Professor of Divinity at Cambridge; 1850–1870	Succeeded by Brooke Foss Westcott
