= Samuel Walker of Truro =

Samuel Walker (1714–1761), called Samuel Walker of Truro, was an English evangelical clergyman of the Church of England.

== Life ==
Born at Exeter on 16 December 1714, he was the fourth son of Robert Walker of Withycombe Raleigh near Exmouth, Devon, by his wife Margaret, daughter of Richard Hall, rector of St. Edmund and All Hallows, Exeter; Robert Walker (1699–1789), his elder brother, made manuscript collections for the history of Cornwall and Devon, which went to Sir Thomas Phillipps. He was educated at Exeter Grammar School from 1722 to 1731, and matriculated at Exeter College, Oxford, on 4 November 1732, graduating B.A. on 25 June 1736.

In 1737 Walker was appointed curate of Doddiscombe Leigh, near Exeter, but resigned his position in August 1738 to accompany Lord Rolle's youngest brother to France as tutor. Returning early in 1740, he became curate of Lanlivery in Cornwall. On the death of the vicar, Nicholas Kendall, a few weeks later, he succeeded him on 3 March 1740. In 1746 he resigned the vicarage, which he had only held in trust, and was appointed curate of Truro and vicar of Talland.

About a year after settling in Truro, Walker came under the influence of George Conon (1698–1775), the master of Truro Grammar School, a Presbyterian graduate of Aberdeen University. He experienced an evangelical conversion, and his well-attended sermons emphasised central parts of evangelical theology. In 1752 he resigned the vicarage of Talland over a scruple on being a pluralist.

In 1754 Walker tried to set up religious society bound by rules of conduct. In 1755 he also formed an association of the neighbouring clergy who met monthly. In September 1755, John Wesley wrote the first of a number of letters to Walker asking his opinions, in particular whether the Methodists, at that point within the Church of England, should leave it: Walker was against separation.

Walker died unmarried on 19 July 1761 at Blackheath, at the house of William Legge, 2nd Earl of Dartmouth, a supporter. He was buried in Lewisham churchyard. Risdon Darracott and Thomas Adam were among his correspondents.

== Works ==
Walker was the author of:

- The Christian: a Course of eleven practical Sermons, London, 1755; 12th ed. 1879.
- Fifty-two Sermons on the Baptismal Covenant, the Creed, the Ten Commandments, and other important Subjects of Practical Religion, London, 1763, 2 vols.; new edition by John Lawson, with a memoir by Edward Bickersteth, 1836.
- Practical Christianity illustrated in Nine Tracts, London, 1765; new edition, 1812.
- The Covenant of Grace, in Nine Sermons, Hull, 1788, reprinted from the Theological Miscellany; new edition, Edinburgh, 1873.
- Ten sermons, entitled The Refiner, or God's Method of Purifying his People, Hull, 1790, reprinted from the Theological Miscellany; reissued in a new arrangement as Christ the Purifier, London, 1794; new edition, 1824.
- The Christian Armour: ten Sermons, now first published from the Author's Remains, London, 1841; new edition, Chichester, 1878.

== Notes ==
Attribution This article incorporates text from a publication now in the public domain: Lee, Sidney, ed. (1899). "Walker, Samuel". Dictionary of National Biography. Vol. 59. London: Smith, Elder & Co.
