= William Empson (lawyer) =

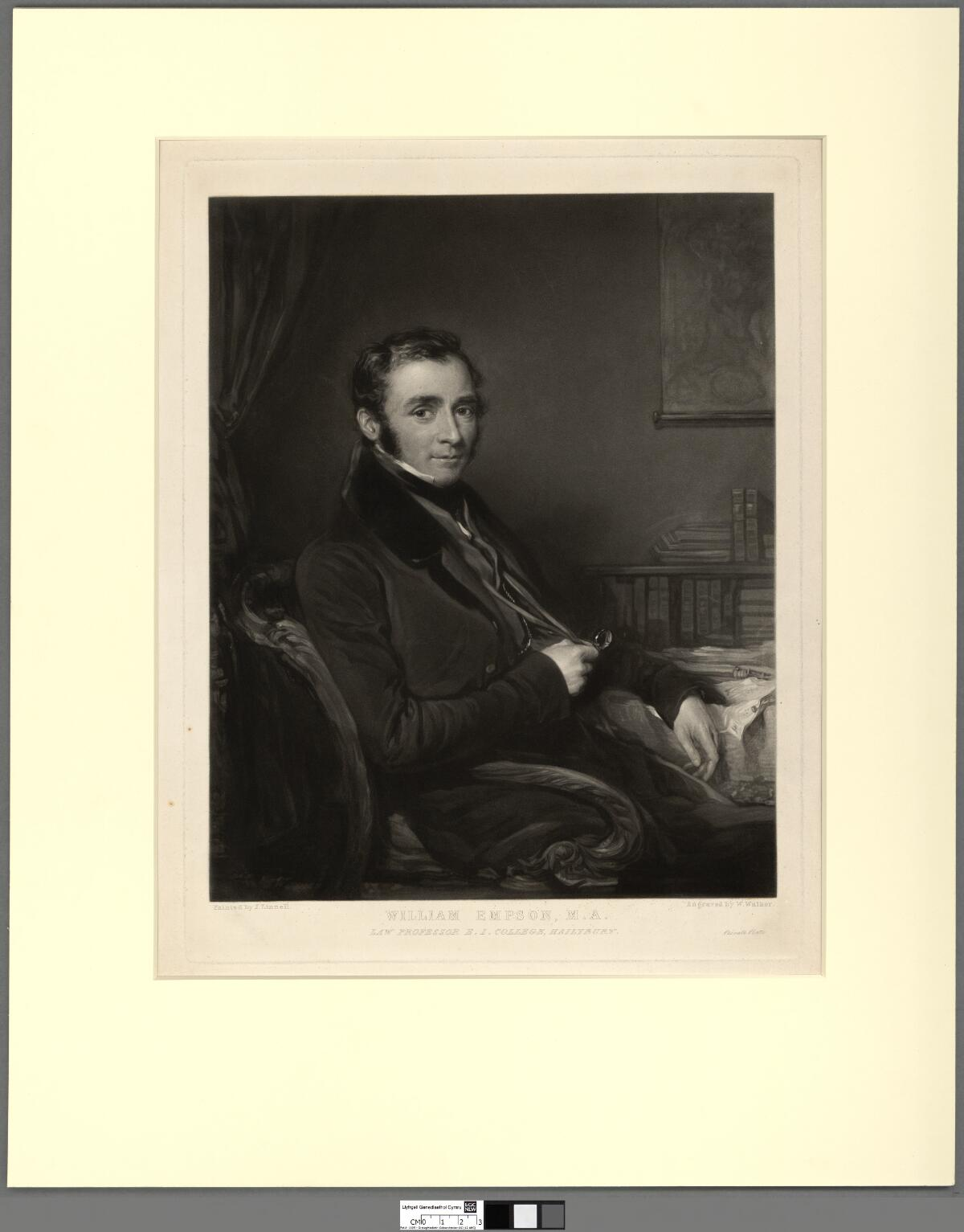
A portrait from the Welsh Portrait Collection at the National Library of Wales.

William Empson (1791 – 10 December 1852) was an English barrister, professor and journalist.

William Empson was educated at Winchester, and Trinity College, Cambridge. He was Professor at the East India Company's College from 1824 to 1852. He contributed regularly to the Edinburgh Review (1823–49) and was for some years its editor (1847–52).

== Life ==
He was educated at Winchester School, where he was a schoolfellow of Thomas Arnold, and at Trinity College, Cambridge. He graduated B.A. 1812, and M.A. 1815.

On 2 July 1824 he became professor of "general polity and the laws of England" at the East India College, Haileybury, a chair which had been formerly occupied by Sir James Mackintosh. He was a close friend of his colleague, Robert Malthus.

Empson died at Haileybury 10 December 1852.

== Edinburgh Review ==
Empson began to contribute to the Edinburgh Review in 1823, and by 1849 had written over sixty articles for it on law, politics, and literary topics.

Empson is now best known for his October 1843 article on Jeremy Bentham, a review of the Memoir of Jeremy Bentham by John Bowring. It produced a contradiction from John Stuart Mill, published in the Review for January 1844. Empson had picked up on Bowring's statement that Bentham was remarkably selfish, comparable only to his follower James Mill.

In January 1845 he wrote on the Fragment of the Church of Thomas Arnold, with whose views on educational and church questions he was in sympathy. Other articles offended Edward Bulwer and Henry Brougham, who called him a bad imitator of Macaulay.

Empson succeeded to the editorship of the Edinburgh Review in 1847, on the death of Macvey Napier.

== Family ==
On 27 June 1838, Empson married Charlotte Jeffrey (b. 1814), daughter of Francis Jeffrey, Lord Jeffrey.
