= Aggiosaurus =

Aggiosaurus Temporal range: Late Jurassic, 160–157.3 Ma

Scientific classification
- Kingdom: Animalia
- Phylum: Chordata
- Class: Reptilia
- Clade: Archosauria
- Clade: Pseudosuchia
- Clade: Crocodylomorpha
- Suborder: †Thalattosuchia
- Family: †Metriorhynchidae
- Tribe: †Geosaurini
- Genus: †Aggiosaurus; Ambayrac, 1913

Type species
- †Aggiosaurus nicaeensis Ambayrac, 1913

Synonyms
- Megalosaurus nicaeensis (Ambayrac, 1913); Dakosaurus nicaeensis (Ambayrac, 1913)

Extinct genus of reptiles

Aggiosaurus is an extinct genus of geosaurine metriorhynchid crocodyliform known from the Late Jurassic (late Oxfordian stage) of Nice, southeastern France. It contains a single species, Aggiosaurus nicaeensis, which was named by H. Ambayrac in 1913.

== History of discovery ==
Aggiosaurus is known only from its holotype, an unnumbered, poorly preserved upper jaw collected by H. Ambayrac in 1912, preserved in limestone which is now housed in the Muséum d'histoire naturelle de Nice. It was collected from the late Oxfordian-aged locality of Cap d'Aggio-La Turbie, in Nice, France. It was initially described as a megalosaurid dinosaur by Ambayrac (1913). Later, Buffetaut (1982) demonstrated that it was in fact a metriorhynchid, closely related to, if not a member of Dakosaurus. As the type specimen is poorly preserved it is sometimes considered to be a nomen dubium. Young & Andrade (2009) suggested that Aggiosaurus is a junior synonym of Dakosaurus, and that A. nicaeensis is referrable to Dakosaurus as a distinct species provisionally. They based this referral on its unusually large dentition (apicobasal length in excess of 6 centimetres or 2.4 inches) that thought to be unique to species of Dakosaurus among all other thalattosuchians. Aggiosaurus actually has the largest dentition of any known metriorhynchid (up to 12 cm (4.7 in) in apicobasal length), although further phylogenetic analyses found that large robust teeth present also in other geosaurins, such as Torvoneustes. Young et al. (2012) resurrected the genus name Plesiosuchus for D. manselii (which also present this trait) as their phylogenetic analysis found a paraphyletic Dakosaurus and suggested more basal position for it within Geosaurini than previously thought. As the presence of unusually large dentition (apicobasal length in excess of 6 cm (2.4 in)) was considered to be homoplastic among geosaurins, Aggiosaurus cannot be considered a junior synonym of either Dakosaurus or Plesiosuchus.

== Etymology ==
Aggiosaurus was first described and named by H. Ambayrac in 1913, and the type species is Aggiosaurus nicaeensis. The generic name is derived from the name of its type locality, Cap d'Aggio-La Turbie, and from "sauros" (σαῦρος), meaning "lizard" in Ancient Greek. The specific name honors Nice, France, in which it was discovered.
