= Charles Webb Le Bas =

English priest

Charles Webb Le Bas (26 April 1779 – 25 January 1861 in Brighton) was an English clergyman, fellow of Trinity College, Cambridge and principal of the East India Company College.

== Life ==
Le Bas was of a Huguenot family: his grandfather had fled to England in 1702. He was educated at Hyde Abbey School, Winchester, and Trinity College, Cambridge, where he graduated BA (4th wrangler and winner of the chancellor's medal) in 1800, and became a fellow of Trinity in 1802. He was called to the Bar from Lincoln's Inn in 1806, but poor hearing forced him to abandon the law. After tutoring the sons of the Bishop of Lincoln, he was ordained in 1812, apparently becoming simultaneously Rector of St Paul's Church, Shadwell, Rector of Darfield, South Yorkshire, Curate of Wombwell and a prebendary of Lincoln. He became a professor of mathematics at the East India Company College at Haileybury in 1813, and was principal of the college from 1837 to 1843.

== Le Bas Prize ==
Old Haileyburians made a subscription in memory of his services there, and in 1848 endowed the Le Bas Scholarships (Bursaries) at the University of Cambridge for the best students in the study of Literature.

== Publications ==
Le Bas was of the theological school which bridged between the Caroline divines and nonjurors and the Oxford Movement, with others such as Hugh James Rose, Christopher Wordsworth, John James Blunt, and William Hodge Mill. He was one of the contributors to the British Critic, and wrote nearly eighty articles for it between 1827 and 1838. He also contributed to Rose's British Magazine in 1831–2.

Le Bas's major works were:

- Considerations on Miracles, 1828, a reprint, with additions, of an article in the British Critic on John Penrose's Treatise on the Evidence of the Christian Miracles.
- Sermons on various occasions (3 vols. 1822–34)
- The Life of the Right Reverend Thomas Fanshaw Middleton, D.D.: Late Lord Bishop of Calcutta. C. J. G. & F. Rivington. 1831. pp. 1–.
- Memoir of Henry Vincent Bayley, 1846, another old friend.

To the Theological Library, edited by Rose and William Rowe Lyall, Le Bas contributed five volumes:

- The life of Wiclif. Printed for J. G. & F. Rivington. 1832.
- The Life of Archbishop Cranmer. Rivington. 1833.
- The Life of Bishop Jewel. J. G. & F. Rivington. 1835. pp. 1–.
- The life of archbishop Laud. J.G. and F. Rivington. 1836. republished 2005 Kessinger Publishing ISBN 1-4179-5714-X

He was also author of tracts for the Society for Promoting Christian Knowledge, and published single sermons:

- Bas, Charles Webb Le (1836). A sermon [on 2 Cor. ii, 16] preached at the consecration of ... W. Otter ... bishop of Chichester. pp. 3–.
