= Amanullah Mirza Qajar =

Iranian prince (1857–1937)

Amanullah Mirza Qajar Аманулла Мирза Каджар امان الله میرزا قاجار
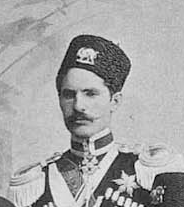
- In 1896
- Born: 8 January 1857; Shusha, Russian Empire
- Died: 1937 (aged 79–80); Tehran, Iran
- Military career
- Allegiance: (Russia) Russian Empire (Azerbaijan) ADR; Qajar Iran
- Branch: Infantry
- Service years: 1879–1920
- Rank: Major General
- Conflicts: Russo-Japanese War; First World War; Armenian-Azerbaijani War
- Awards: Order of St. Vladimir; Order of St. Anna; Order of St. Stanislav; Golden Weapon for Bravery

Amanullah Mirza Qajar (Russian: Аманулла Мирза Каджар; Persian: امان الله میرزا قاجار; Azerbaijani Əmənulla Mirzə Bəhmən mirzə oğlu Qovanlı-Qacar) (1857—1937) was a Qajar prince. He was also an Imperial Russian and Azerbaijani military commander, obtaining the rank of Major General.

== Early life ==
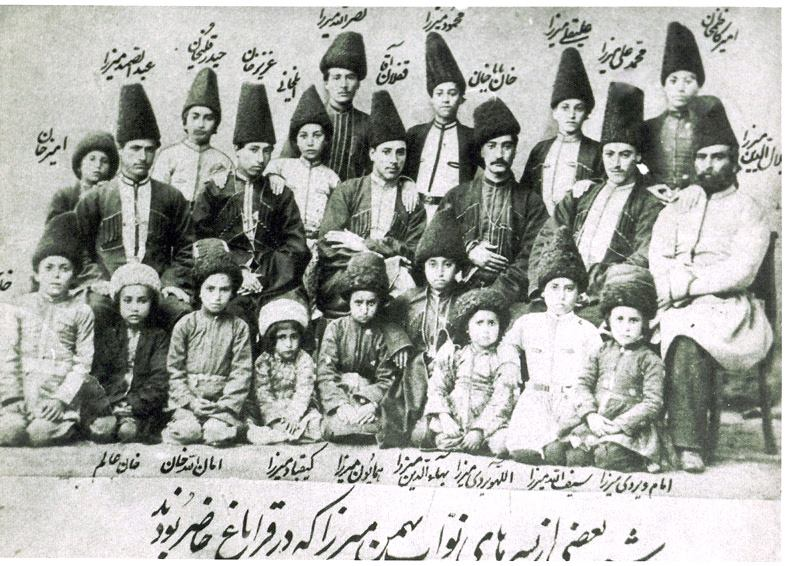
First row, third from left

Amanullah Mirza Qajar was born on January 8, 1857, in the city of Shusha in the Russian Empire (modern day Azerbaijan.) He was the 17th son of Prince Bahman Mirza Qajar of Iran by one of the latter's junior wives. Like all descendants of Bahman Mirza, he bore the title of Prince of Persia (Russian: принц персидский) in the Russian empire.

== Career ==
=== Russian Army ===
Amanullah entered military service on July 19, 1879, in the 164th Zagatala Infantry Regiment. In 1883, he was promoted to podporuchik. On November 20, 1886, he was transferred to the 2nd plastun Battalion of the Kuban Cossacks. On May 9, 1902, Amanullah was promoted to yesaul. On April 16, 1909, he became starshina of the army and the commander of the 9th Battalion of the Kuban plastun.

=== First World War ===
During World War I, Amanullah fought on the Austrian front. He was awarded the Order of St. Anne 2nd Class with swords, the Order St. Vladimir 3rd Class with swords, and the Order St. Stanislaus 3rd Class. On April 25, 1915, he was promoted to colonel. Because of a severe leg wound, Amanullah was sent to the rear for treatment. In 1916, he returned to the front. Along with his battalion, he fought near the village of Marhonovka. Amanullah captured the enemy trenches and destroyed the enemy's manpower. During the operations on November 5, 1916, he was awarded the Saint George Sword. He received the rank of Major General in 1917. After the February Revolution, he lived in Tbilisi and Shusha.

=== Azerbaijan Democratic Republic ===
After the Azerbaijan Democratic Republic (ADR) created its first army as a newly established state, Amanullah filed a report on 1 December 1918, to the newly established Ministry of War with a request of admission to their armed forces. In March 1919, he was a part of the emergency diplomatic mission of the Republic of Azerbaijan and participated in the Iranian government in Tehran. He served as chairman of the central military service presence. On January 27, 1920, Major General Amanullah was appointed as the deputy chief of the 1st Infantry Division of the ADR and head of the garrisons in Khankendi and Shusha. He participated in fighting the attacks of the Armenian armed forces on the military units of the ADR on 22–23 March 1920.

=== Iran ===
After the fall of the ADR in connection with the repression of the Bolsheviks, Amanullah was forced to leave for Iran. Living in Tehran, he taught at the military school and participated in the formation of the Iranian army. He was a deputy of the Majlis (Parliament) of Iran, and the chairman of the society of the Iranian-Soviet friendship. He died in 1937 in Tehran.

== Sources ==
- Назирли Шамистан (2006) [Güllələnmiş Azərbaycan Generalları]. Расстрелянные генералы Азербайджана (2-е изд ed.). М. Баку. pp. 79–80.
- Азербайджанская Демократическая Республика (1918—1920). Армия. (Документы и материалы). — Баку, 1998
- Азербайджанская Демократическая Республика (1918—1920). Внешняя политика. (Документы и материалы). — Баку, 1998
