= Joseph Batten =

Joseph Hallet Batten FRS (25 August 1778, Penzance – 11 October 1837, Brighton) was principal of the East India Company College.

The Batten family were for some time the leading merchants of Penzance. Batten was educated at St Paul's School in London, Truro Grammar School, and Trinity College, Cambridge. He became a fellow of Trinity in 1801.

Batten became Professor of Classical Literature at the East India Company College on its opening in 1805. He married Catherine Maxwell on 4 July 1807. They lived at Hertingfordbury with their children, until Batten was appointed Principal (Master) of the college on 18 January 1815. Soon afterwards, he was made Doctor of Divinity by royal mandate. He was elected a Fellow of the Royal Society in 1816.

He lived with his family at the Master's Lodge of the college, until he became disabled shortly before his death.
