= John Clavell Mansel-Pleydell =

English scientist (1817-1902)

John Clavell Mansel-Pleydell (1817–1902), originally John Clavell Mansel, was an English antiquary, known for contributions to geology, botany, and ornithology.

== Life ==
Born in Bramshaw, Dorset, on 4 December 1817, he was eldest son of twin boys (brother George was the younger twin) of Colonel John Mansel (1776–1863) of Smedmore, Dorset by his wife Louisa, fourth daughter of Edmund Morton Pleydell of Whatcombe, Dorset. Educated privately, with Henry Walter as a tutor, he entered St. John's College, Cambridge in 1836, and graduated B.A. in 1839.

Mansell was admitted a student of Lincoln's Inn on 2 May 1840, but was not called to the bar. For thirty years he was an officer in the Queen's Own Dorset Yeomanry. He was promoted from lieutenant to captain on 26 July 1856. He was one of the promoters of the Somerset and Dorset Railway, and suffered financial losses.

In 1856 Mansel built at his own expense the Milborne Reformatory, which was converted in 1882 into an industrial school. In 1857 he was made a fellow of the Geological Society, and was later also a fellow of the Linnean Society. He succeeded on his mother's death to the family estate of Whatcombe, Dorset, and to landed property in the Isle of Purbeck in 1863. In 1872 he assumed the additional name of Pleydell, his mother's maiden name. He founded the Dorset Natural History and Antiquarian Field Club in 1875, and was its president till his death.

In 1876 Mansel-Pleydell was high sheriff of Dorset, and he was a member of the county council from its establishment in 1887 till his death. He was an evangelical in religion, and a Liberal in politics until 1886, when he changed his party after the Home Rule Bill.

Mansel-Pleydell died at his Dorset residence on 3 May 1902.

== Works ==
Mansel-Pleydell was the author of:

- The Flora of Dorsetshire, 1874; 2nd edit. 1895.
- The Birds of Dorsetshire, 1888.
- The Mollusca of Dorsetshire, 1898.

He also contributed papers on natural science and archaeology to the journals of learned societies.

== Legacy ==
Mansel-Pleydell presented many geological finds made by himself to the County Museum of Dorset. These included a fore paddle of a Pleiosaurus macromerus, and the tusks and molars of a Mammuthus meridionalis.

After his death, in 1902, a fund was raised to commission a portrait of John Clavell Mansel-Pleydell. This fund was over-subscribed by £83.00. His successor as the president of the Dorset Natural History and Antiquarian Field Club, Lord Eustace Cecil, donated a gift of £300.00. The funds were combined in the Mansel-Pleydell & Cecil Memorial Trust, for the promotion of the study of natural history, archaeology and physical sciences in Dorset. Originally, a small cash prize and a silver medal were provided for the winners of two competitions: one focussing on natural history and archaeology, and one on chemistry. Over the years the two fields were combined, and the medals were replaced by larger cash prizes. Income of the Trust is now also used for activities of the Dorset Museum.

The first awards in 1906 were for W. Parkinson Curtis, who published about the ringed plover, and for Ernest W. Short, who published on "electricity as applied to household purposes." Since then more than 200 prizes were awarded.

== Family ==
Mansel-Pleydell married twice:

1. on 6 June 1844, Emily (died 4 Nov. 1845), daughter of Captain A. Bingham; and
2. on 21 June 1849, Isabel, the daughter of F. C. Acton Colville, Captain in the Scots Guards.

He celebrated his golden wedding on 21 June 1899. Of three sons, two survived him.

== Notes ==
Attribution

This article incorporates text from a publication now in the public domain: Lee, Sidney, ed. (1912). "Mansel-Pleydell, John Clavell". Dictionary of National Biography (2nd supplement). Vol. 2. London: Smith, Elder & Co.
