= East India Company College =

Former college in Hailey, Hertfordshire, England

- Hailey, Hertfordshire; England

Information
- Established: 1806
- Closed: 1858

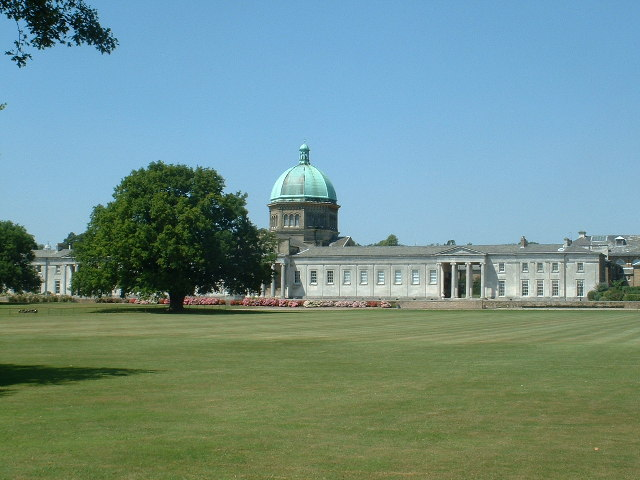
The former East India Company College, now Haileybury and Imperial Service College

The East India Company College, or East India College, was an educational establishment situated at Hailey, Hertfordshire, nineteen miles north of London, founded in 1806 to train "writers" (administrators) for the East India Company. It provided general and vocational education for young gentlemen of sixteen to eighteen years old, who were nominated by the Company's directors to writerships in its overseas civil service. The college's counterpart for the training of officers for the company's Presidency armies was Addiscombe Military Seminary, Surrey.

The East India Company was nationalised and the college closed in 1858. It reopened in 1862 as Haileybury College, an independent fee-paying school (traditionally known in England as a public school). In 1942 it merged with the separate Imperial Service College to become Haileybury and Imperial Service College.

== History ==
Charles Grant, Chairman of the British East India Company and a Member of Parliament (MP), was closely involved in the foundation of the college. It was first located in Hertford Castle but it was evident that a purpose-built seat of learning would be more suitable and in October 1805 the company purchased an estate just outside Hertford Heath for the sum of £5,930 (equivalent to £442,570 in 2025) for this objective. The foundation stone of the new buildings were laid on 12 May 1806. The buildings cost the East India Company £92,000 (equivalent to £7.14 million in 2025) at the time of their erection to the designs of the architect William Wilkins (who later designed the National Gallery in London). The grounds were landscaped by Humphry Repton, his most notable work here being the terraced area to the front of Wilkins' main range and ponds to the west of this. Repton submitted his final account for work undertaken here just eight days before a carriage accident which left him crippled. The new buildings were occupied by students in 1809.

The East India Company had been incorporated in 1600 as a commercial entity. For two hundred years its administrators had been recruited, largely by patronage, to oversee commercial transactions in Asia. By 1800 they had become the de facto government for millions of people in those areas, but without much training for the role. The college was intended to address these shortcomings. In fifty years it trained over two thousand so-called "writers" to administer the Indian subcontinent.

The curriculum was wide, detailed, and targeted to the career responsibilities. It included political economy, history, mathematics, natural philosophy, classics, law and humanity and philology. Languages included Arabic, Urdu (Hindustani), Bengali, Marathi, Sanskrit, Telugu and Persian. Among the tutors were some of the finest minds of the day, many from Oxford and Cambridge, with lavish annual salaries as much as £500.

The college was customarily referred to as "Haileybury" in contemporary accounts, debates in the House of Lords and the House of Commons and by the administrators of the East India Company and the Colonial Civil Service. From 1839 the college had a journal known as the Haileybury Observer.

The East India Company itself was seen as too powerful. There was pressure for meritocracy to replace recruitment by patronage. Figures such as Benjamin Jowett of Balliol College pressed government ministers to break Haileybury's monopoly on Indian Civil Service training and to privilege graduates of the universities instead. In 1855, Parliament passed an act "to relieve the East India Company from the obligation to maintain the College at Haileybury". King's College, London, hosted the first open competitive examinations for appointment to the Indian Civil Service.

== Closure and later use of buildings ==
In the aftermath of the Indian Mutiny of 1857, and in anticipation of the winding-up of the affairs of the East India Company itself, the college was closed in January 1858. This left the puzzle of what to do with the imposing buildings. For a brief period, they became a military depot for troops destined for India, and during this interregnum the college's Master, Henry Melvill, and Registrar, the Reverend James William Lucas Heaviside, continued to live in their residences on the site and oversaw the maintenance of the buildings. In 1861, the estate was sold at public auction, when it was bought by the British Land Company for £15,000 (equivalent to £1.54 million in 2025).

A Hertford publisher, Stephen Austin, who had been the official printer to the East India Company’s College and had thus become one of the leading printers of books in various Oriental languages, led a campaign to ensure the buildings were returned to some sort of academic purpose, and in 1862 the site reopened as the public school Haileybury College. This was formally constituted by a royal charter dated 30 August 1864. During the Victorian era, the difference between the two periods of education on the site was referred to as "Old Haileybury" and "New Haileybury".

In its early years, the new Haileybury College retained close links to those involved in colonial administration, and in 1942 it merged with the Imperial Service College to become Haileybury and Imperial Service College.

== Administrators ==
=== Principals ===
The college had four principals:

- 1806–1815: Samuel Henley
- 1815–1837: Joseph Batten
- 1837–1843: Charles Webb Le Bas
- 1844–1858: Henry Melvill, afterwards Canon of St. Paul's

=== Deans ===
The position of dean was filled by one of the professors:

- 1813: William Dealtry, MA
- 1814–1838: Charles Webb Le Bas, MA
- 1838–1850: James Amiraux Jeremie (Professor of Classics)
- 1850–1857: W. E. Buckley

=== Registrars ===
The position of registrar was filled by one of the professors:

- 1813: William Dealtry
- 1814–1816: Bewick Bridge
- 1816–1830: Edward Lewton
- 1831–1834: Henry George Keene
- 1834–1837: James Michael
- 1838–1857: Fred Smith

== Professors ==
=== Languages ===
- Alexander Hamilton taught Sanskrit and Bengali (1806–18).
- Charles Stewart taught Hindustani (Urdu) and Persian (1806–).
- Graves Chamney Haughton (1817–27) FRS previously of Fort William College, Calcutta, taught Hindustani, Persian, Arabic, Bengali and Sanskrit.
- Francis Johnson taught Sanskrit, Bengali and Telugu (1824–55).
- Mirza Muhammed Ibrahim, a Persian, held a permanent appointment as a professor of Arabic and Persian (1826–44)
- Monier Monier-Williams taught Sanskrit, Bengali and Telugu (1844–58).
- Edward Backhouse Eastwick was Professor of Hindustani, Hindi and Marathi (1845–57).
- Major J. W. J.Ouseley, Professor of Persian and Arabic (previously Professor of the Arabic and Persian Languages in the College of Fort-William, Calcutta) (1844–57)
- Sheth Ghoolam Hyder, Professor of Persian and had the title of Oriental Writing Master

=== Law ===
- Edward Christian (1806–18)
- James Mackintosh was Professor of Law and General Politics 1818–24.
- William Empson, was Professor of Law (1824–52).
- John Farley Leith QC (1872–80), later Member of Parliament for Aberdeen

=== Political Economy ===
- Thomas Malthus taught from 1805–34.
- Richard Jones was Professor of History and Political Economy (1834–55).
- The Rt Hon Sir James Stephen also taught political economy (1855–57)

=== Mathematics and Natural Philosophy ===
- William Dealtry was Professor of Mathematics 1806–13. He had been Second Wrangler in 1796.
- Bewick Bridge (1767–1833) was Professor of Mathematics 1806–16.
- Charles Webb Le Bas (1813–37)
- Charles Babbage applied unsuccessfully for a job in 1816.
- Henry Walter (1816–30)
- William Sturgeon lectured on science in 1824.
- Frederick Smith (1831–50) of Peterhouse, Cambridge
- J. W. L. Heaviside (1838–57) previously of Trinity College, and then Sidney Sussex College, Cambridge, where he graduated Second Wrangler and a Smith's Prize winner in 1830, and tutored until he moved to Haileybury.

=== Classical and General Literature ===
- Edward Lewton (1806–30)
- Joseph Hallett Batten (1806–15)
- James Amiraux Jeremie (also Dean) (1830–50), elected in 1850 Regius Professor of Divinity at Cambridge.
- W. E. Buckley (1850–57) previously tutor and fellow at Brasenose College, Oxford and Professor of Anglo-Saxon at Oxford (1844–50), and a member and subsequently vice-president of the Roxburghe Club.

=== Other ===
- Henry George Keene, who served at the Battle of Seringapatam with the first Lord Harris (his uncle), and whose American wife, though she came of a New England family, was related to Lord Cornwallis. His son became a Fellow of the University of Calcutta and a prolific writer.
- Horace Hayman Wilson, Examiner in Sanskrit (1837–57)

Assistants in the Oriental Department included Maulavi Abdal Aly (1809–12), Maulavi Mirza Khedel (1809–19), The Revd. Robert Anderson (1820–25), and David Shea (1826–36). Moonshy Ghoolam Hyder and Thomas Medland taught oriental writing.

== Notable alumni ==
- Sir Edward Colebrooke, 4th Baronet
- John Russell Colvin
- Ashley Eden
- Henry Bartle Frere
- John Peter Grant
- Brian Houghton Hodgson
- Allan Octavian Hume
- Sir John Lawrence
- Charles Merivale
- Monier Monier-Williams
- John Muir
- Sir William Muir
- Richard Paternoster
- Sir Richard Temple, 1st Baronet
- James Thomason
- Charles Trevelyan
- Charles Pelham Villiers
- Charles John Wingfield
