= Mirza Muhammed Ibrahim =

Iranian educator

Mirza Muhammed Ibrahim or Mirza Mohammad Ibrahim (Persian: میرزا محمد ابراهیم; c. 1800 – July, 1857) was an educator who traveled from his native Iran to Britain in 1826. There, he took up a permanent appointment to teach oriental languages at the prestigious East India Company College, where he remained until 1844. While there, he also worked as an official translator, becoming friendly with Lord Palmerston. He was the author of an English and Persian grammar textbook.

There were rumours that he had left Persia because of religious differences with the establishment. However, while abroad, he remained a faithful Muslim, despite the prevailing British social climate in favour of Christianity.

After returning to Persia in 1844, he became tutor to the future Shah.
