= Humphry Davy =

British chemist and inventor (1778–1829)

Sir Humphry Davy Bt FRS MRIA FGS
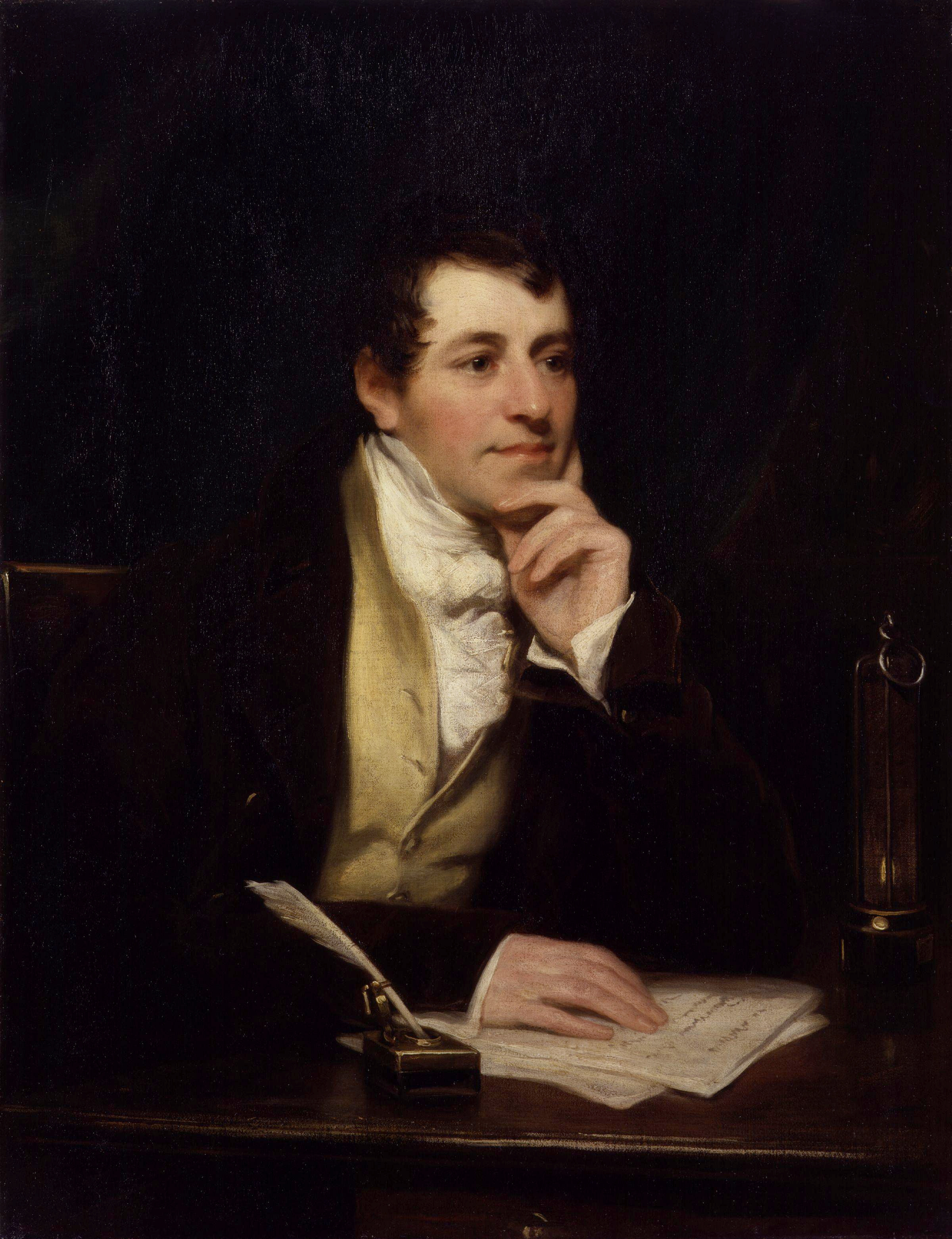
- Portrait by Thomas Phillips, 1821
- Born: 17 December 1778; Penzance, Cornwall, England
- Died: 29 May 1829 (aged 50); Geneva, Switzerland
- Known for: List: Arc lamp; Aluminium; Cathodic protection; Chlorine; Cool flame; Copper sheathing; Davy lamp; Electrochemistry; Electrolysis; Electrowinning; Enlarger; Discovery of potassium; Isolation of barium; Isolation of boron; Isolation of calcium; Isolation of magnesium; Isolation of sodium; Isolation of strontium; Nitrous oxide; Synthesis of phosphorus trichloride
- Awards: Copley Medal (1805); Bakerian Medal (1806, 1807, 1808, 1809, 1810, 1811, 1826); Galvanism Prize (1807); Rumford Medal (1816); Royal Medal (1827)
- Scientific career
- Fields: Chemistry
- Workplaces: Royal Society; Royal Institution

23rd President of the Royal Society
- In office 1820–1827
- Preceded by: William Hyde Wollaston
- Succeeded by: Davies Gilbert

Signature
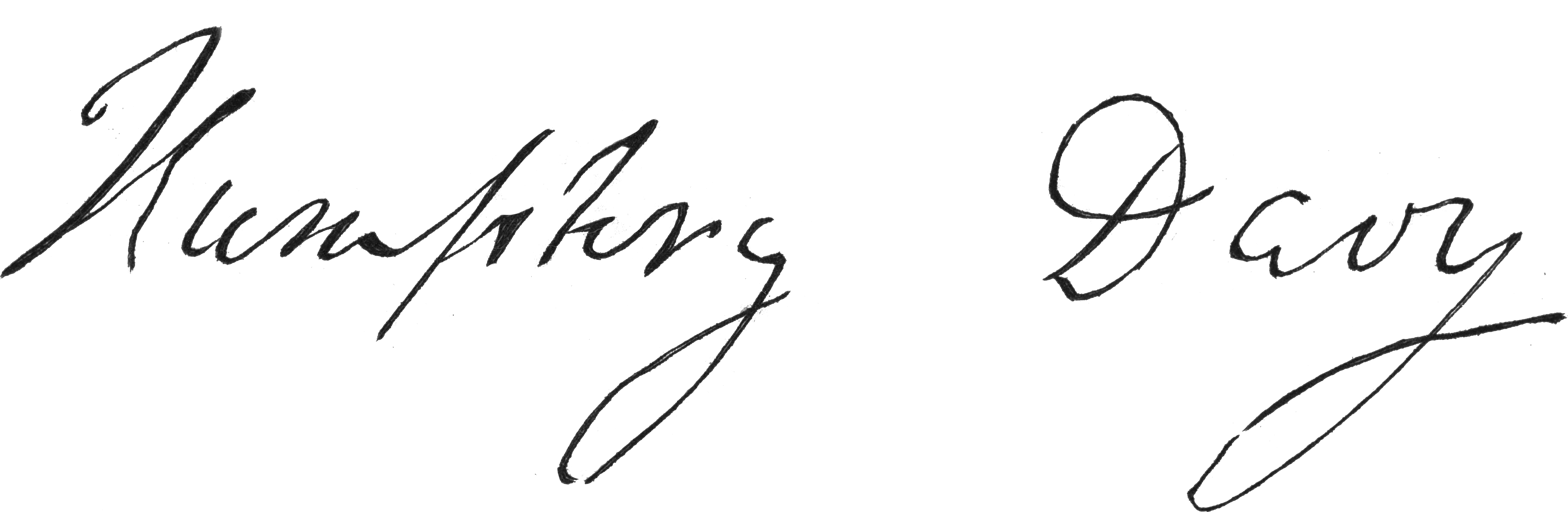

Sir Humphry Davy, 1st Baronet (17 December 1778 – 29 May 1829) was a British chemist and inventor who invented the Davy lamp and an early form of arc lamp. He is also remembered for isolating, by using electricity, several elements for the first time: potassium and sodium in 1807 and calcium, strontium, barium, magnesium, and boron the following year, and for discovering the elemental nature of chlorine and iodine. Davy also studied the forces involved in these separations, inventing the new field of electrochemistry. He is credited with discovering clathrate hydrates.

In 1799, Davy experimented with nitrous oxide and was astonished when inhaling it made him laugh. He nicknamed it "laughing gas" and wrote about its potential as an anaesthetic to relieve pain during surgery.

Davy was a baronet, President of the Royal Society (PRS), Member of the Royal Irish Academy (MRIA), a founder member and Fellow of the Geological Society of London, a member of the Royal Geological Society of Cornwall, and a member of the American Philosophical Society. Berzelius called Davy's 1806 Bakerian Lecture "On Some Chemical Agencies of Electricity" "one of the best memoirs which has ever enriched the theory of chemistry."

== Early life: 1778–1798 ==
=== Education, apprenticeship, and poetry ===
Davy was born in Penzance, Cornwall, England on 17 December 1778, the eldest of the five children of Robert Davy, a woodcarver, and his wife Grace Millett. According to his brother and fellow chemist John Davy, their hometown was characterised by "an almost unbounded credulity respecting the supernatural and monstrous ... Amongst the middle and higher classes, there was little taste for literature, and still less for science ... Hunting, shooting, wrestling, cockfighting, generally ending in drunkenness, were what they most delighted in."

==== Education ====
At the age of six, Davy was sent to the grammar school at Penzance. Three years later, his family moved to Varfell, near Ludgvan, and subsequently, in term-time, Davy boarded with John Tonkin, his godfather and later his guardian. Upon Davy's leaving grammar school in 1793, Tonkin paid for him to attend Truro Grammar School to finish his education under the Rev Dr Cardew, who, in a letter to the engineer and Fellow of the Royal Society Davies Giddy (from 1817 called Davies Gilbert), said dryly, "I could not discern the faculties by which he was afterwards so much distinguished." Davy entertained his school friends by writing poetry, composing Valentines, and telling stories from One Thousand and One Nights. Reflecting on his school days in a letter to his mother, Davy wrote, "Learning naturally is a true pleasure; how unfortunate then it is that in most schools it is made a pain." "I consider it fortunate", he continued, "I was left much to myself as a child, and put upon no particular plan of study ... What I am I made myself." His brother said Davy possessed a "native vigour" and "the genuine quality of genius, or of that power of intellect which exalts its possessor above the crowd."

==== Apothecary's apprentice ====
After Davy's father died in 1794, Tonkin apprenticed him to John Bingham Borlase, a surgeon with a practice in Penzance. While becoming a chemist in the apothecary's dispensary, he began conducting his earliest experiments at home, much to the annoyance of his friends and family. His older sister, for instance, complained his corrosive substances were destroying her dresses, and at least one friend thought it likely the "incorrigible" Davy would eventually "blow us all into the air."

In 1797, after he learnt French from a refugee priest, Davy read Lavoisier's Traité élémentaire de chimie. This exposure influenced much of his future work, which can be seen as reaction against Lavoisier's work and the dominance of French chemists.

==== Poetry ====
As a poet, Davy wrote over one hundred and sixty manuscript poems, the majority of which are found in his personal notebooks. Most of his written poems were not published, and he chose instead to share a few of them with his friends. Eight of his known poems were published. His poems reflected his views on both his career and also his perception of certain aspects of human life. He wrote on human endeavours and aspects of life like death, metaphysics, geology, natural theology, and chemistry.

John Ayrton Paris remarked that poems written by the young Davy "bear the stamp of lofty genius". Davy's first preserved poem entitled "The Sons of Genius" is dated 1795 and marked by the usual immaturity of youth. Other poems written in the following years, especially "On the Mount's Bay" and "St Michael's Mount", are descriptive verses.

Although he initially started writing his poems, albeit haphazardly, as a reflection of his views on his career and on life generally, most of his final poems concentrated on immortality and death. This was after he started experiencing failing health and a decline both in health and career.

==== Painting ====
Three of Davy's paintings from around 1796 have been donated to the Penlee House museum at Penzance. One is of the view from above Gulval showing the church, Mount's Bay, and the Mount, while the other two depict Loch Lomond in Scotland.

==== Materiality of heat ====
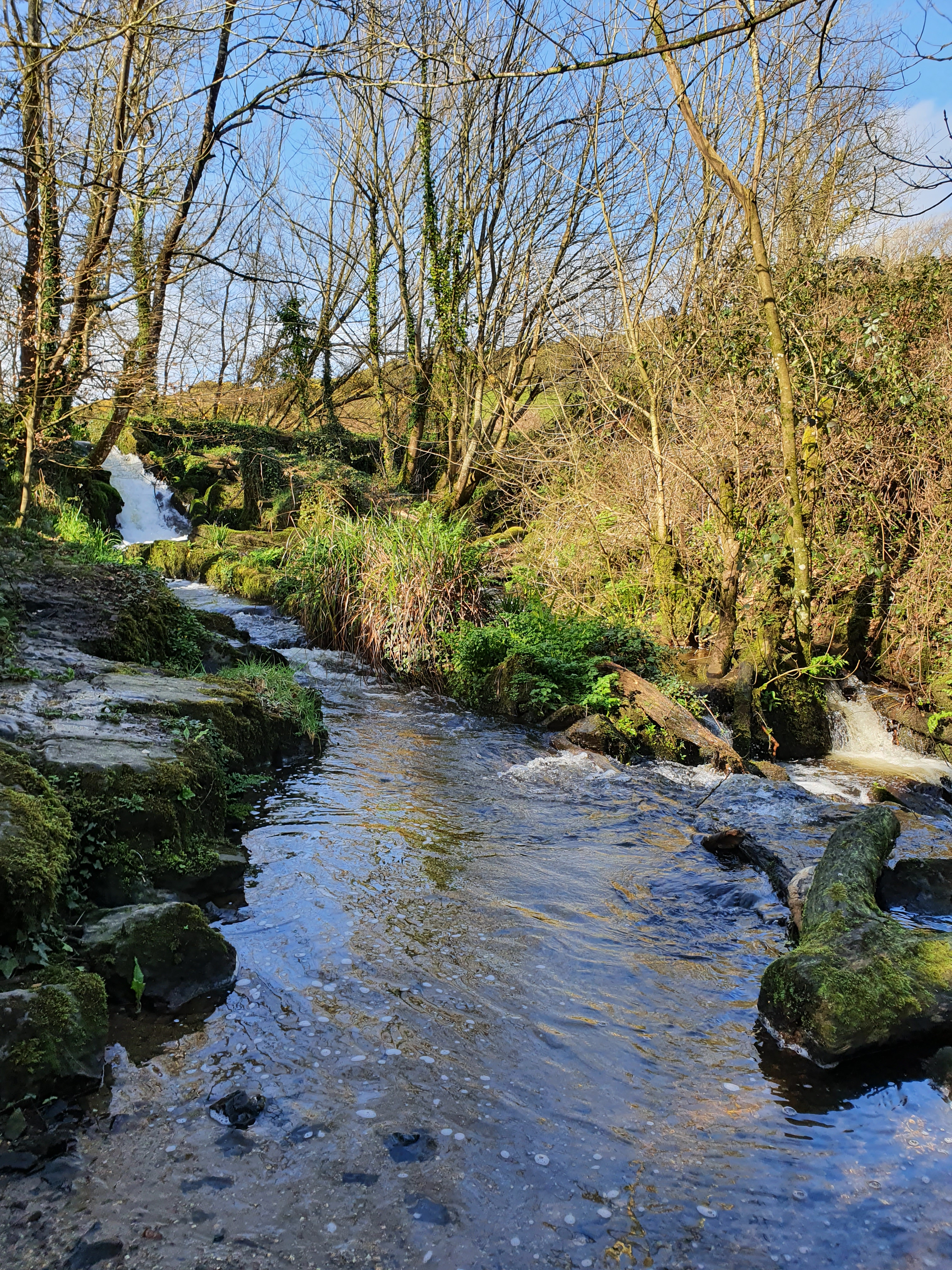
Lariggan River

At 17, he discussed the question of the materiality of heat with his Quaker friend and mentor Robert Dunkin. Dunkin remarked: 'I tell thee what, Humphry, thou art the most quibbling hand at a dispute I ever met with in my life.' One winter day he took Davy to the Lariggan River to show him that rubbing two plates of ice together developed sufficient energy by motion to melt them, and that after the motion was suspended, the pieces were united by regelation. It was a crude form of analogous experiment exhibited by Davy in the lecture-room of the Royal Institution that elicited considerable attention. As professor at the Royal Institution, Davy repeated many of the ingenious experiments he learnt from Dunkin.

== Early career: 1798–1802 ==
=== Davy's gift for chemistry is recognised ===
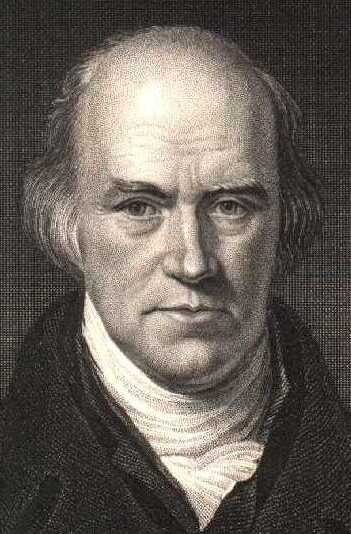
Davies Giddy (later: Davies Gilbert)

Davies Giddy met Davy in Penzance carelessly swinging on the half-gate of Dr Borlase's house, and interested by his talk invited him to his house at Tredrea and offered him the use of his library. This led to his introduction to Dr Edwards, who lived at Hayle Copper House. Edwards was a lecturer in chemistry in the school of St. Bartholomew's Hospital. He permitted Davy to use his laboratory and possibly directed his attention to the floodgates of the port of Hayle in Cornwall, which were rapidly decaying as a result of the contact between copper and iron under the influence of seawater. Galvanic corrosion was not understood at that time, but the phenomenon prepared Davy's mind for subsequent experiments on ships' copper sheathing. Gregory Watt, son of James Watt, visited Penzance for his health's sake, and while lodging at the Davys' house became a friend and gave him instructions in chemistry. Davy was also acquainted with the Wedgwood family, who spent a winter at Penzance.

==== Thomas Beddoes ====
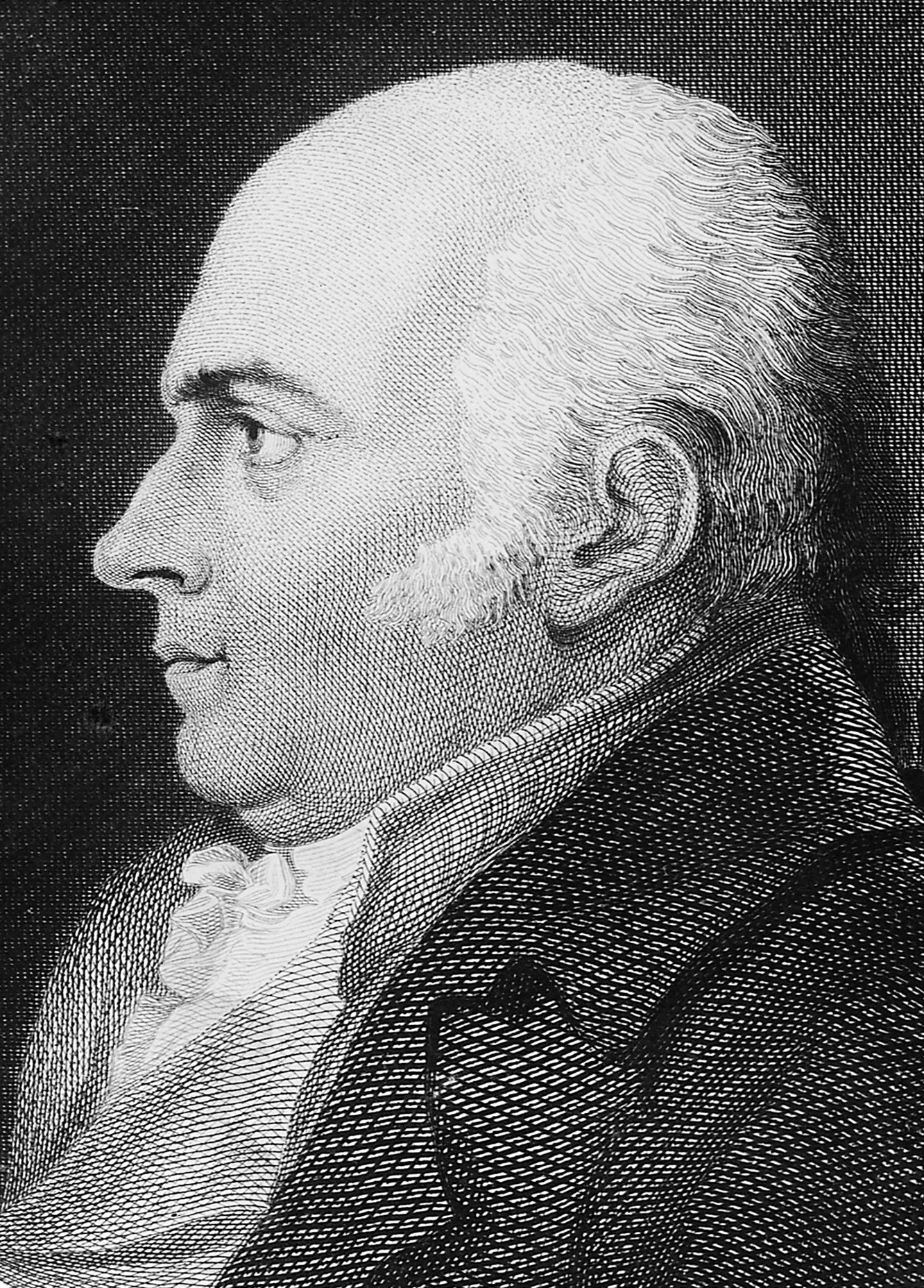
Thomas Beddoes

At this time, physician and scientific writer Thomas Beddoes and geologist John Hailstone were engaged in a geological controversy on the rival merits of the Plutonian and Neptunist hypotheses. They travelled together to examine the Cornish coast accompanied by Giddy—an intimate friend of Beddoes—and made Davy's acquaintance. Beddoes had established at Bristol a medical research facility called the 'Pneumatic Institution', and needed an assistant to superintend the laboratory. Giddy recommended Davy, and in 1798 Gregory Watt showed Beddoes Davy's Young man's Researches on Heat and Light, which he later published in the first volume of West-Country Contributions. After prolonged negotiations, Mrs. Davy and Borlase consented to Davy's departure. Tonkin wished him to remain in his native town as a surgeon, and altered his will when Davy insisted on going to Dr Beddoes.

=== Pneumatic Institution ===
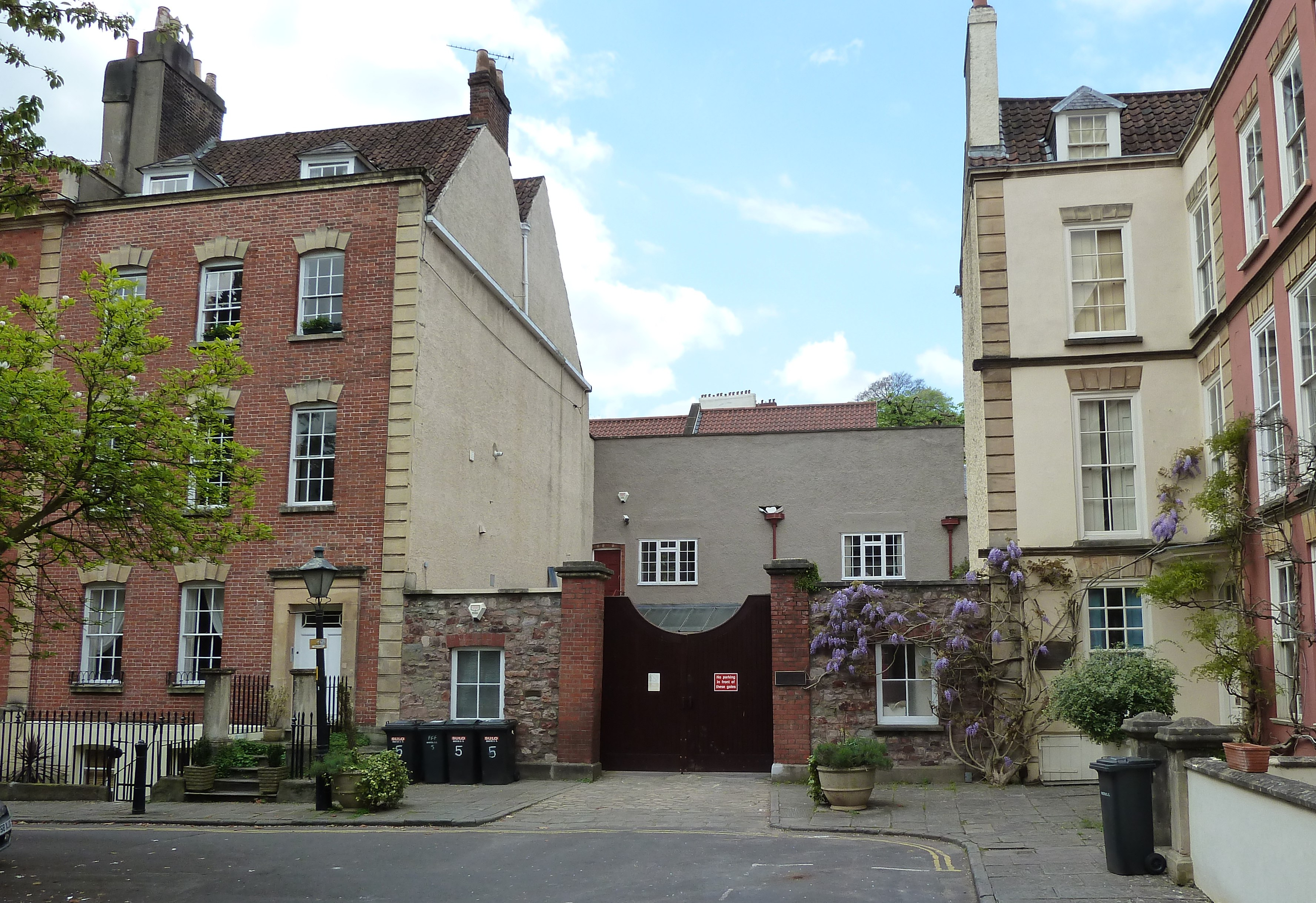
Site of the Pneumatic Institution, Bristol

On 2 October 1798, Davy joined the Pneumatic Institution at Bristol. It had been established to investigate the medical powers of factitious airs and gases (gases produced experimentally or artificially), and Davy was to superintend the various experiments. The arrangement agreed between Dr Beddoes and Davy was generous, and enabled Davy to give up all claims on his paternal property in favour of his mother. He did not intend to abandon the medical profession and was determined to study and graduate at Edinburgh, but he soon began to fill parts of the institution with voltaic batteries. While living in Bristol, Davy met the Earl of Durham, who resided in the institution for his health.

==== Anna Beddoes ====
Davy threw himself energetically into the work of the laboratory and formed a long romantic friendship with Mrs Anna Beddoes, the novelist Maria Edgeworth's sister, who acted as his guide on walks and other fine sights of the locality. The critic Maurice Hindle was the first to reveal that Davy and Anna had written poems for each other. Wahida Amin has transcribed and discussed a number of poems written between 1803 and 1808 to "Anna" and one to her infant child.

==== Non-existence of caloric ====
In 1799, the first volume of the West-Country Collections was issued. Half consisted of Davy's essays On Heat, Light, and the Combinations of Light, On Phos-oxygen and its Combinations, and on the Theory of Respiration. On 22 February 1799 Davy, wrote to Davies Giddy, "I am now as much convinced of the non-existence of caloric as I am of the existence of light."

==== Nitrous oxide ====
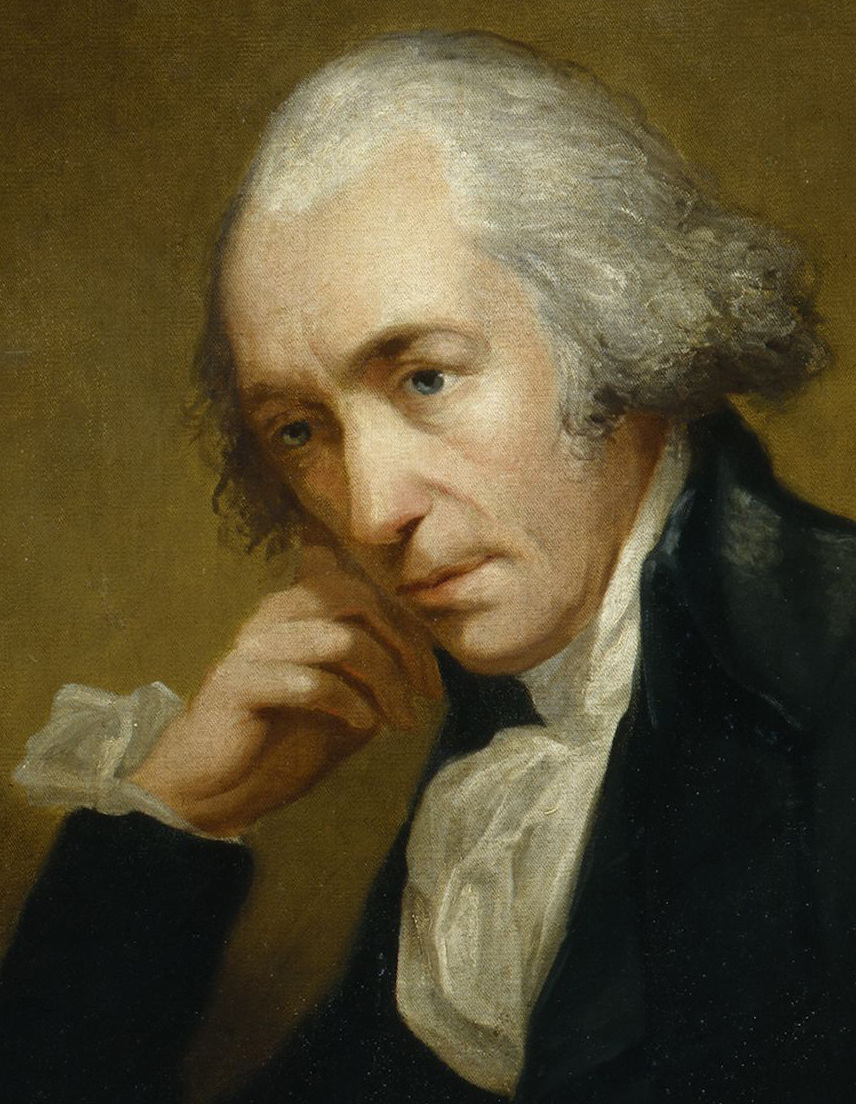
James Watt in 1792 by Carl Frederik von Breda

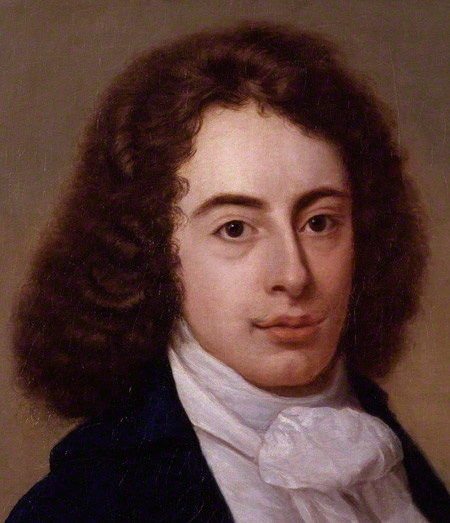
Robert Southey

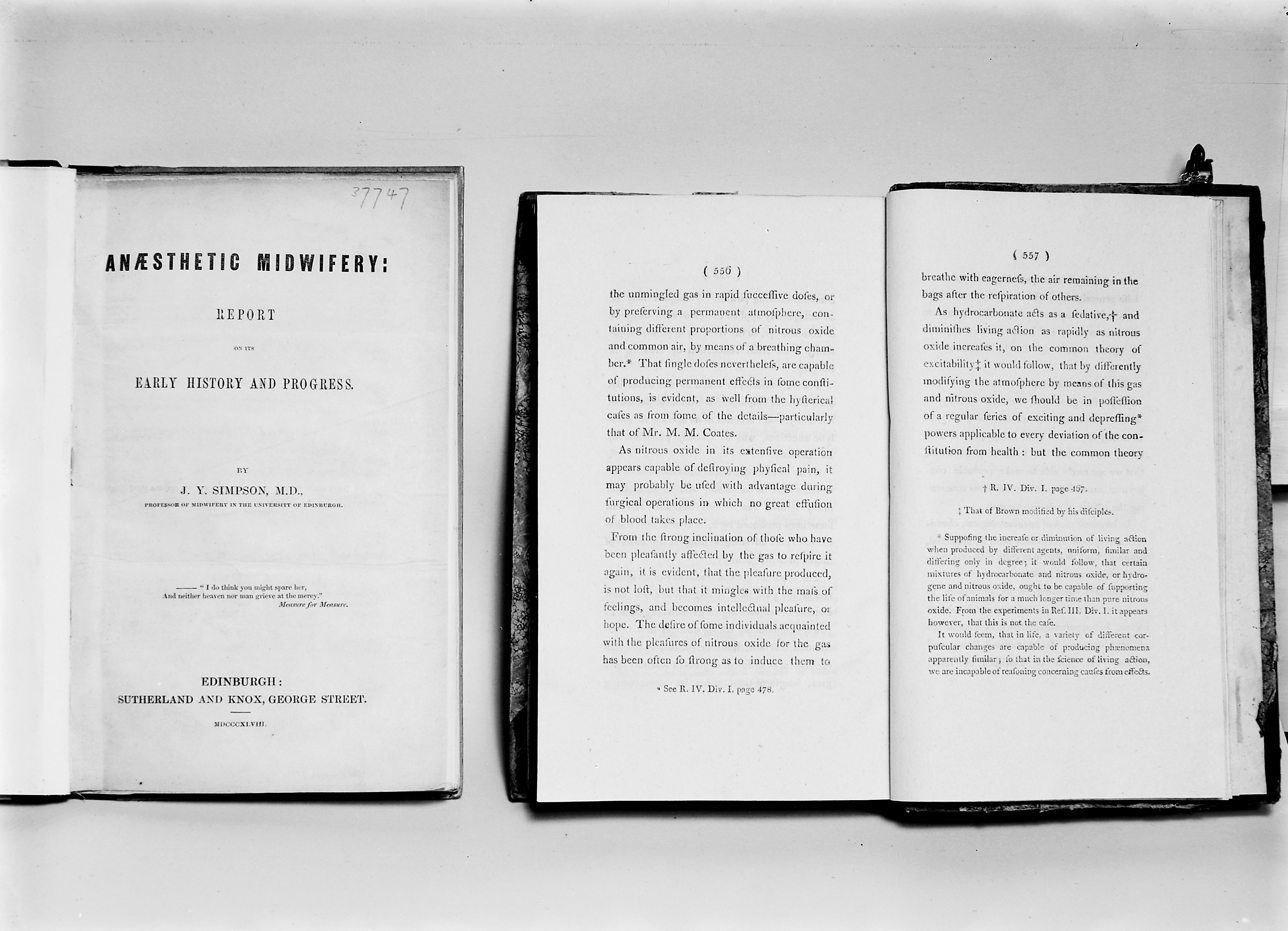
Sir Humphry Davy's Researches chemical and philosophical: chiefly concerning nitrous oxide (1800), pp. 556 and 557 (right), outlining potential anaesthetic properties of nitrous oxide in relieving pain during surgery

In 1799, Davy became increasingly well known due to his experiments with the physiological action of some gases, including laughing gas (nitrous oxide). The gas was first synthesised in 1772 by the natural philosopher and chemist Joseph Priestley, who called it dephlogisticated nitrous air (see phlogiston). Priestley described his discovery in the book Experiments and Observations on Different Kinds of Air (1775), in which he described how to produce the preparation of "nitrous air diminished", by heating iron filings dampened with nitric acid. In another letter to Giddy, on 10 April, Davy informs him: "I made a discovery yesterday which proves how necessary it is to repeat experiments. The gaseous oxide of azote (the laughing gas) is perfectly respirable when pure. It is never deleterious but when it contains nitrous gas. I have found a mode of making it pure." He said that he breathed sixteen quarts of it for nearly seven minutes, and that it "absolutely intoxicated me."

In addition to Davy himself, his enthusiastic experimental subjects included his poet friends Robert Southey and Samuel Taylor Coleridge, and Gregory Watt and James Watt, other close friends. James Watt built a portable gas chamber to facilitate Davy's experiments with the inhalation of nitrous oxide. At one point the gas was combined with wine to judge its efficacy as a cure for hangover (his laboratory notebook indicated success). The gas was popular among Davy's friends and acquaintances, and he noted that it might be useful for performing surgical operations. Anesthetics were not regularly used in medicine or dentistry until decades after Davy's death.

==== Carbon monoxide ====
In the gas experiments Davy ran considerable risks. His respiration of nitric oxide which may have combined with air in the mouth to form nitric acid (HNO_{3}), severely injured the mucous membrane, and in Davy's attempt to inhale four quarts of "pure hydrocarbonate" gas in an experiment with carbon monoxide he "seemed sinking into annihilation." On being removed into the open air, Davy faintly articulated, "I do not think I shall die," but some hours elapsed before the painful symptoms ceased. Davy was able to take his own pulse as he staggered out of the laboratory and into the garden, and he described it in his notes as "threadlike and beating with excessive quickness".

==== Early publications ====
During 1799, Beddoes and Davy published Contributions to physical and medical knowledge, principally from the west of England and Essays on heat, light, and the combinations of light, with a new theory of respiration. On the generation of oxygen gas, and the causes of the colors of organic beings. Their experimental work was poor, and the publications were harshly criticised. In after years Davy regretted he had ever published these immature hypotheses, which he subsequently designated "the dreams of misemployed genius which the light of experiment and observation has never conducted to truth." These criticisms, however, led Davy to refine and improve his experimental techniques, spending his later time at the institution increasingly in experimentation.

In December 1799 Davy visited London for the first time and extended his circle of friends. Davy features in the diary of William Godwin, with their first meeting recorded for 4 December 1799.

In 1800, Davy informed Giddy that he had been "repeating the galvanic experiments with success" in the intervals of the experiments on the gases, which "almost incessantly occupied him from January to April." In 1800, Davy published his Researches, Chemical and Philosophical, chiefly concerning Nitrous Oxide and its Respiration, and received a more positive response.

==== Proofreading Lyrical Ballads ====
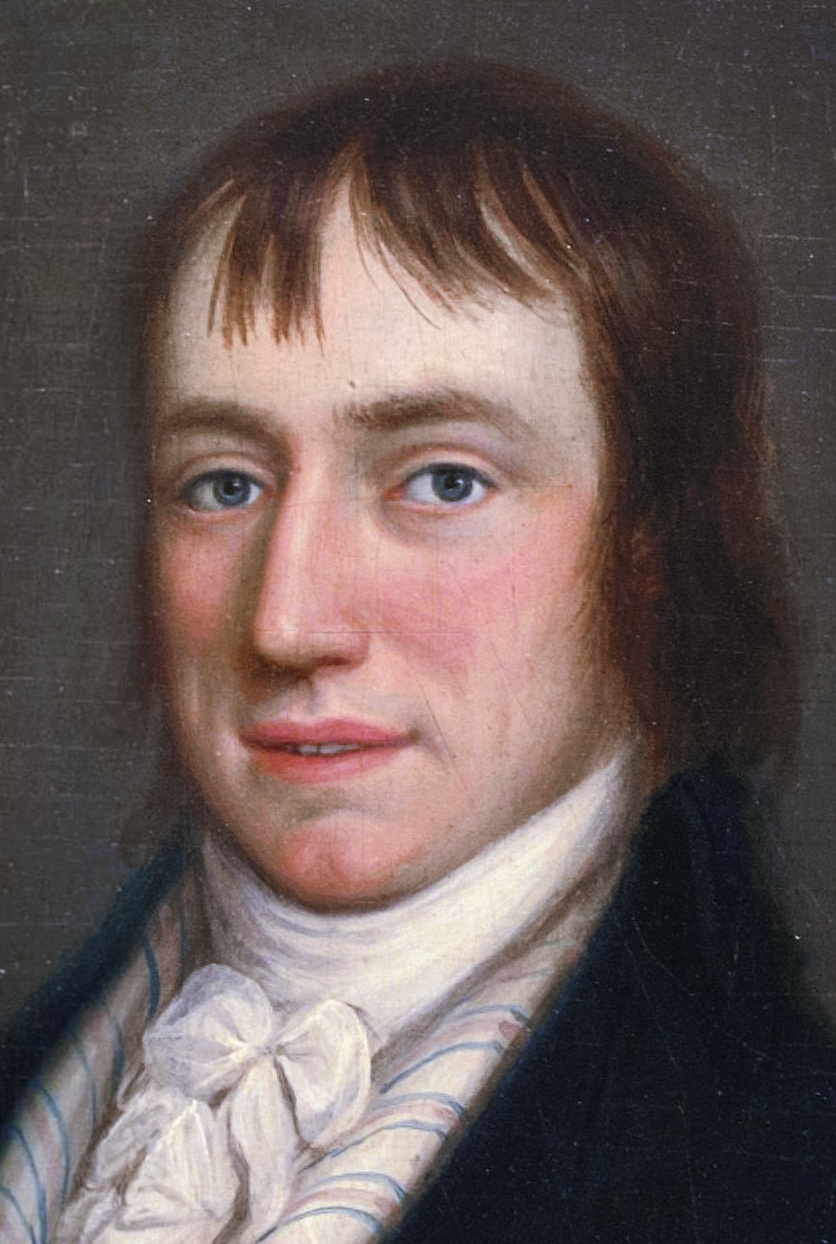
William Wordsworth at 28, by William Shuter (1798)

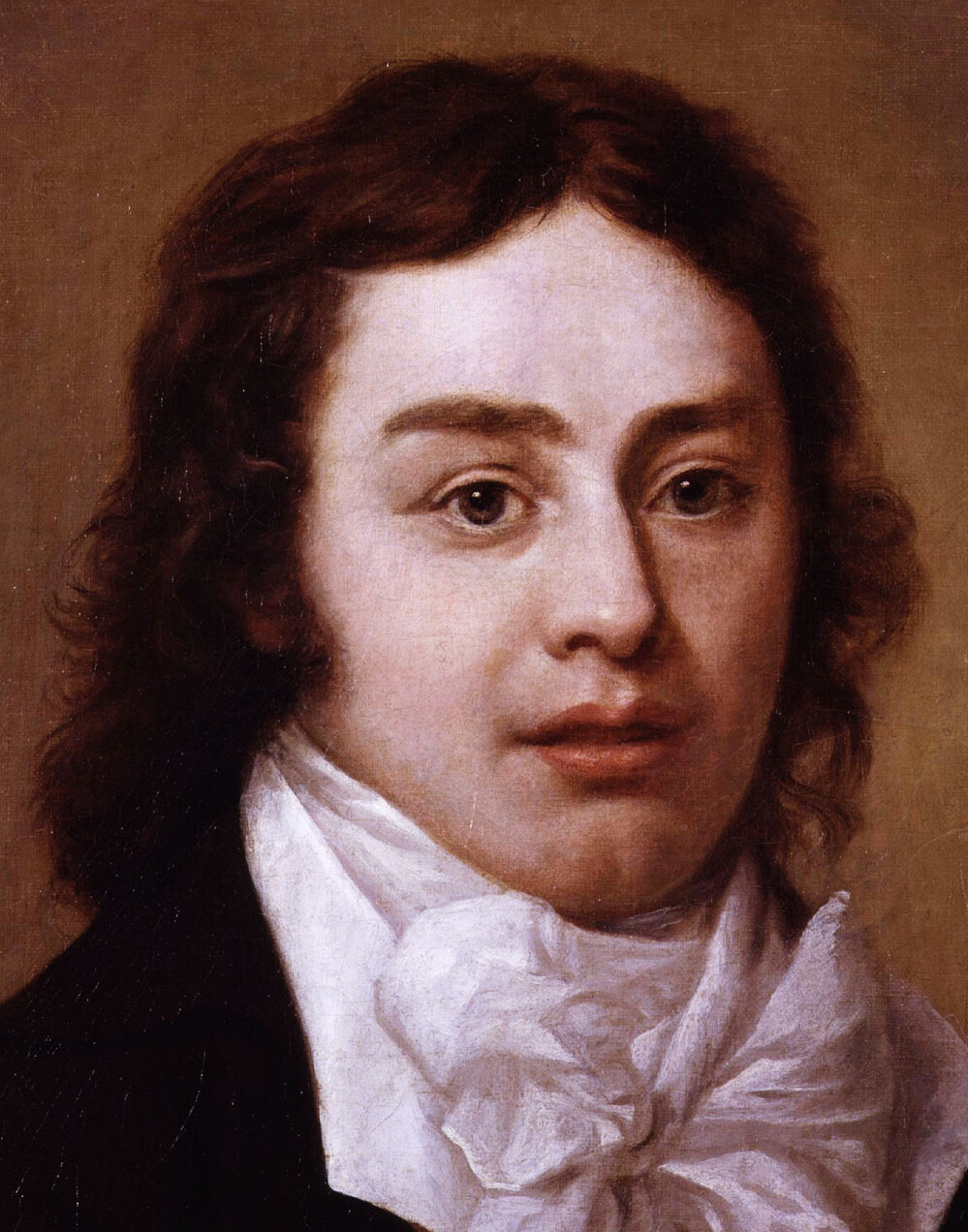
Samuel Taylor Coleridge, by Peter Vandyke (1795)

William Wordsworth and Samuel Taylor Coleridge moved to the Lake District in 1800, and asked Davy to deal with the Bristol publishers of the Lyrical Ballads, Biggs & Cottle. Coleridge asked Davy to proofread the second edition, the first to contain Wordsworth's "Preface to the Lyrical Ballads", in a letter dated 16 July 1800: "Will you be so kind as just to look over the sheets of the lyrical Ballads". Wordsworth subsequently wrote to Davy on 29 July 1800, sending him the first manuscript sheet of poems and asking him specifically to correct: "any thing you find amiss in the punctuation a business at which I am ashamed to say I am no adept". Wordsworth was ill in the autumn of 1800 and slow in sending poems for the second edition; the volume appeared on 26 January 1801 even though it was dated 1800. While it is impossible to know whether Davy was at fault, this edition of the Lyrical Ballads contained many errors, including the poem "Michael" being left incomplete. In a personal notebook marked on the front cover "Clifton 1800 From August to Novr", Davy wrote his own Lyrical Ballad: "As I was walking up the street". Wordsworth features in Davy's poem as the recorder of ordinary lives in the line: "By poet Wordsworths Rymes" [sic].

=== Royal Institution ===
In 1799, Benjamin Thompson (Count Rumford) had proposed the establishment in London of an 'Institution for Diffusing Knowledge', i.e. the Royal Institution. The house in Albemarle Street was bought in April 1799. Rumford became secretary to the institution, and Dr Thomas Garnett was the first lecturer.

In February 1801 Davy was interviewed by the committee of the Royal Institution, comprising Joseph Banks, Benjamin Thompson, and Henry Cavendish. Davy wrote to Davies Giddy on 8 March 1801 about the offers made by Banks and Thompson, a possible move to London, and the promise of funding for his work in galvanism. He also mentioned that he might not be collaborating further with Beddoes on therapeutic gases. The next day Davy left Bristol to take up his new post at the Royal Institution, it having been resolved 'that Humphry Davy be engaged in the service of the Royal Institution in the capacity of assistant lecturer in chemistry, director of the chemical laboratory, and assistant editor of the journals of the institution, and that he be allowed to occupy a room in the house, and be furnished with coals and candles, and that he be paid a salary of 100l. per annum.'

On 25 April 1801, Davy gave his first lecture on the relatively new subject of 'Galvanism'. He and his friend Coleridge had had many conversations about the nature of human knowledge and progress, and Davy's lectures gave his audience a vision of human civilisation brought forward by scientific discovery. "It [science] has bestowed on him powers which may almost be called creative; which have enabled him to modify and change the beings surrounding him, and by his experiments to interrogate nature with power, not simply as a scholar, passive and seeking only to understand her operations, but rather as a master, active with his own instruments." The first lecture garnered rave reviews, and by the June lecture Davy wrote to John King that his last lecture had attendance of nearly 500 people. "There was Respiration, Nitrous Oxide, and unbounded Applause. Amen!" Davy revelled in his public status.

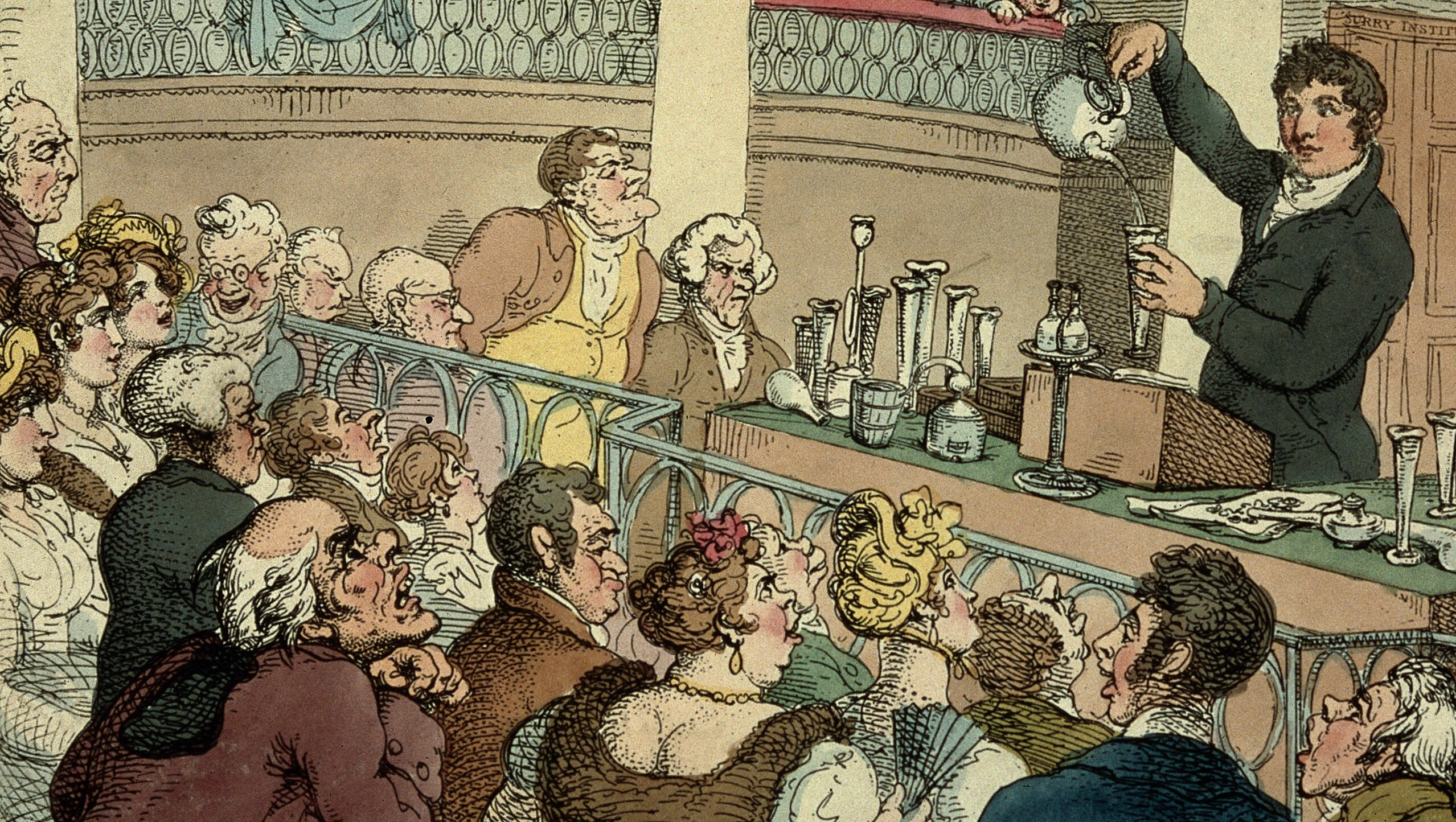
Chemical lectures – etching by Thomas Rowlandson

==== Women's scientific education ====
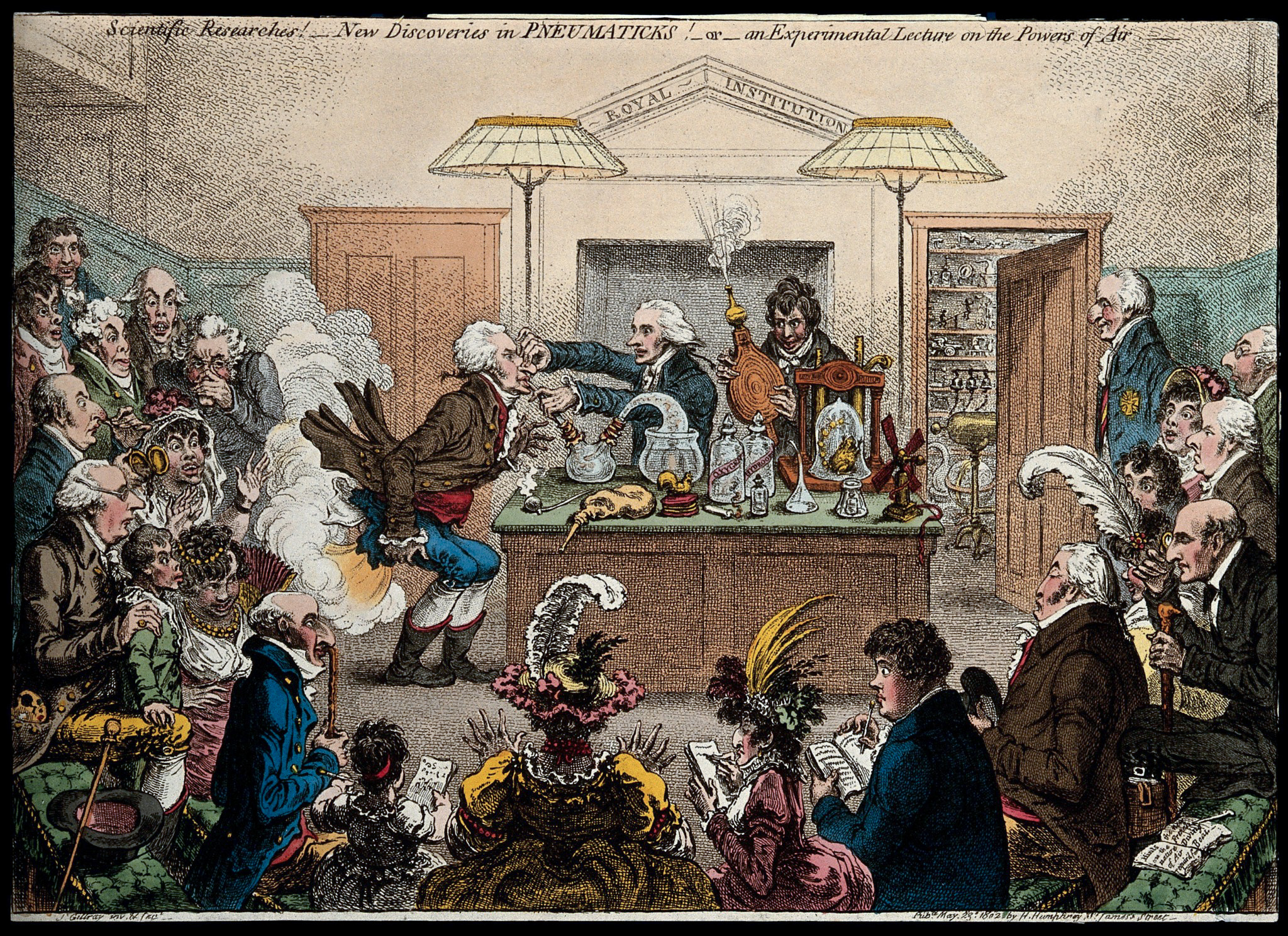
1802 satirical cartoon by James Gillray showing a Royal Institution lecture on pneumatics, with Davy holding the bellows and Count Rumford looking on at extreme right. Dr Thomas Garnett is the lecturer, holding the victim's nose.

Davy's lectures included spectacular and sometimes dangerous chemical demonstrations along with scientific information, and were presented with considerable showmanship by the young and handsome man. Davy also included both poetic and religious commentary in his lectures, emphasizing that God's design was revealed by chemical investigations. Religious commentary was in part an attempt to appeal to women in his audiences. Davy, like many of his enlightenment contemporaries, supported female education and women's involvement in scientific pursuits, even proposing that women be admitted to evening events at the Royal Society. Davy acquired a large female following around London. In a satirical cartoon by Gillray, nearly half of the attendees pictured are female. His support of women caused Davy to be subjected to considerable gossip and innuendo, and to be criticised as unmanly.

==== Incandescent light and arc light ====
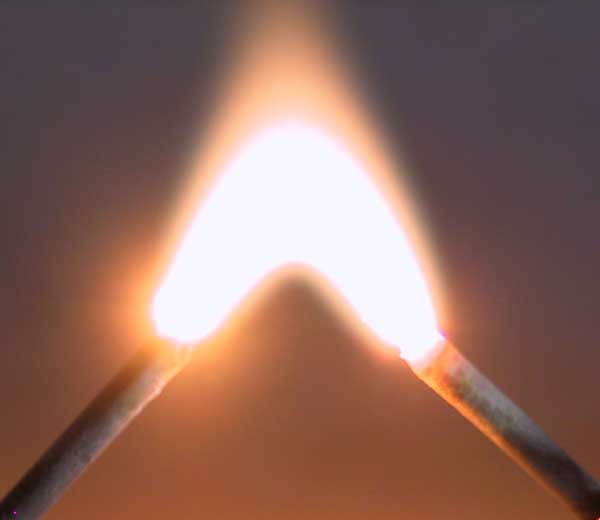
An electric arc between two nails

In 1802, Humphry Davy had what was then the most powerful electrical battery in the world at the Royal Institution. With it, Davy created the first incandescent light by passing electric current through a thin strip of platinum, chosen because the metal had an extremely high melting point. It was neither sufficiently bright nor long lasting enough to be of practical use, but demonstrated the principle. By 1806 he demonstrated a much more powerful form of electric lighting to the Royal Society in London. It was an early form of arc light which produced its illumination from an electric arc created between two charcoal rods.

==== Full lecturer at the Royal Institution ====
When Davy's lecture series on Galvanism ended, he progressed to a new series on agricultural chemistry, and his popularity continued to skyrocket. By June 1802, after just over a year at the Institution and at the age of 23, Davy was nominated to full lecturer at the Royal Institution of Great Britain. Garnett, the incumbent lecturer, quietly resigned, citing health reasons.

==== Royal Society ====
In November 1804 Davy became a Fellow of the Royal Society, over which he would later preside. He was one of the founding members of the Geological Society of London in 1807 and later became a Fellow. He was elected a foreign member of the Royal Swedish Academy of Sciences and as an honorary member of the American Philosophical Society in 1810, and a Foreign Honorary Member of the American Academy of Arts and Sciences in 1822.

== Mid-career: 1802–1820 ==
=== Photographic enlargements ===
In June 1802 Davy published in the first issue of the Journals of the Royal Institution of Great Britain his An Account of a Method of Copying Paintings upon Glass, and of Making Profiles, by the Agency of Light upon Nitrate of Silver. Invented by T. Wedgwood, Esq. With Observations by H. Davy in which he described their experiments with the photosensitivity of silver nitrate.

He recorded that "images of small objects, produced by means of the solar microscope, may be copied without difficulty on prepared paper." Josef Maria Eder, in his History of Photography, though crediting Wedgwood, because of his application of this quality of silver nitrate to the making of images, as "the first photographer in the world," proposes that it was Davy who realised the idea of photographic enlargement using a solar microscope to project images onto sensitised paper. Neither found a means of fixing their images, and Davy devoted no more of his time to furthering these early discoveries in photography.

The principle of image projection using solar illumination was applied to the construction of the earliest form of photographic enlarger, the "solar camera".

=== Elements ===
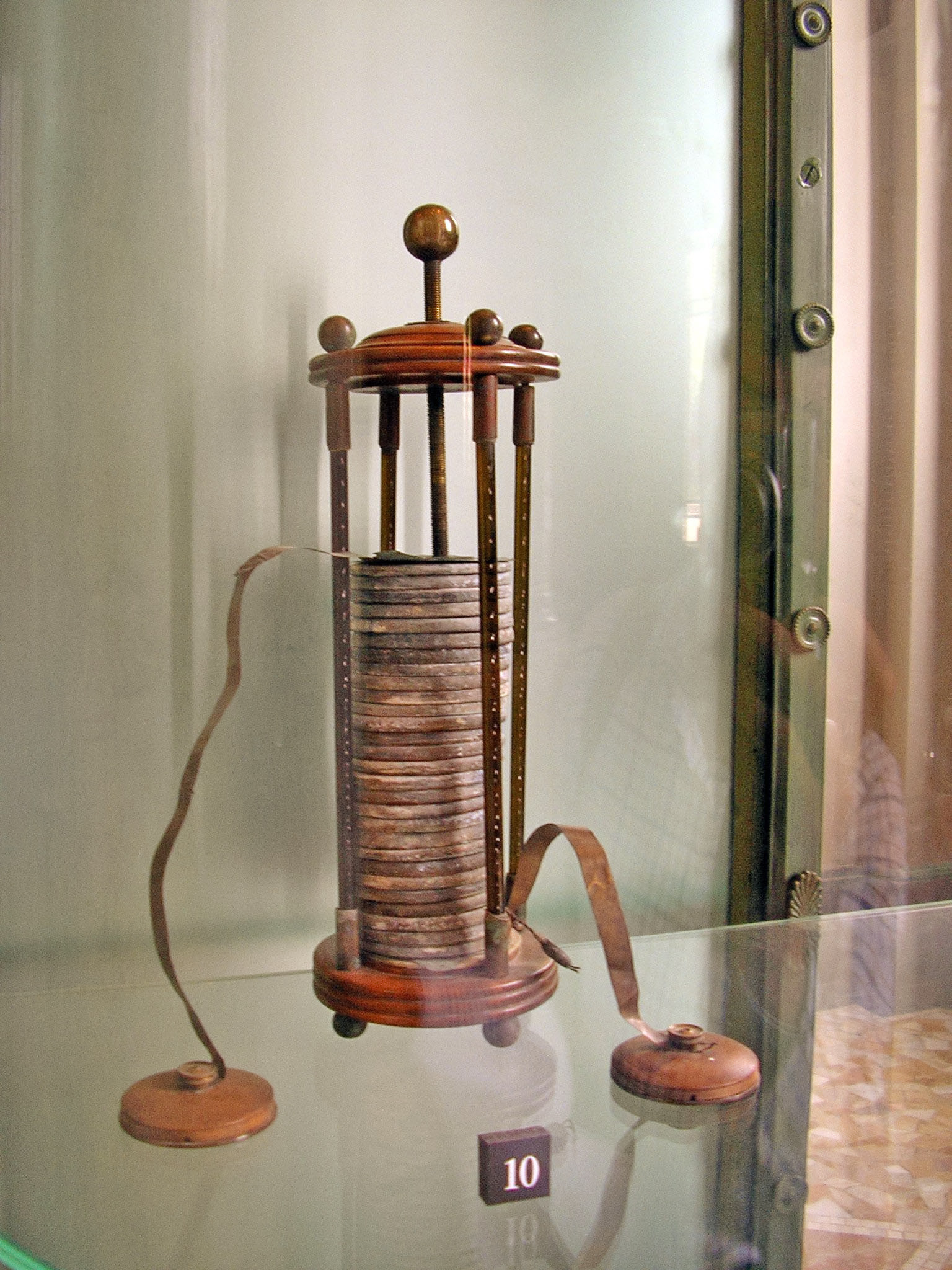
A voltaic pile

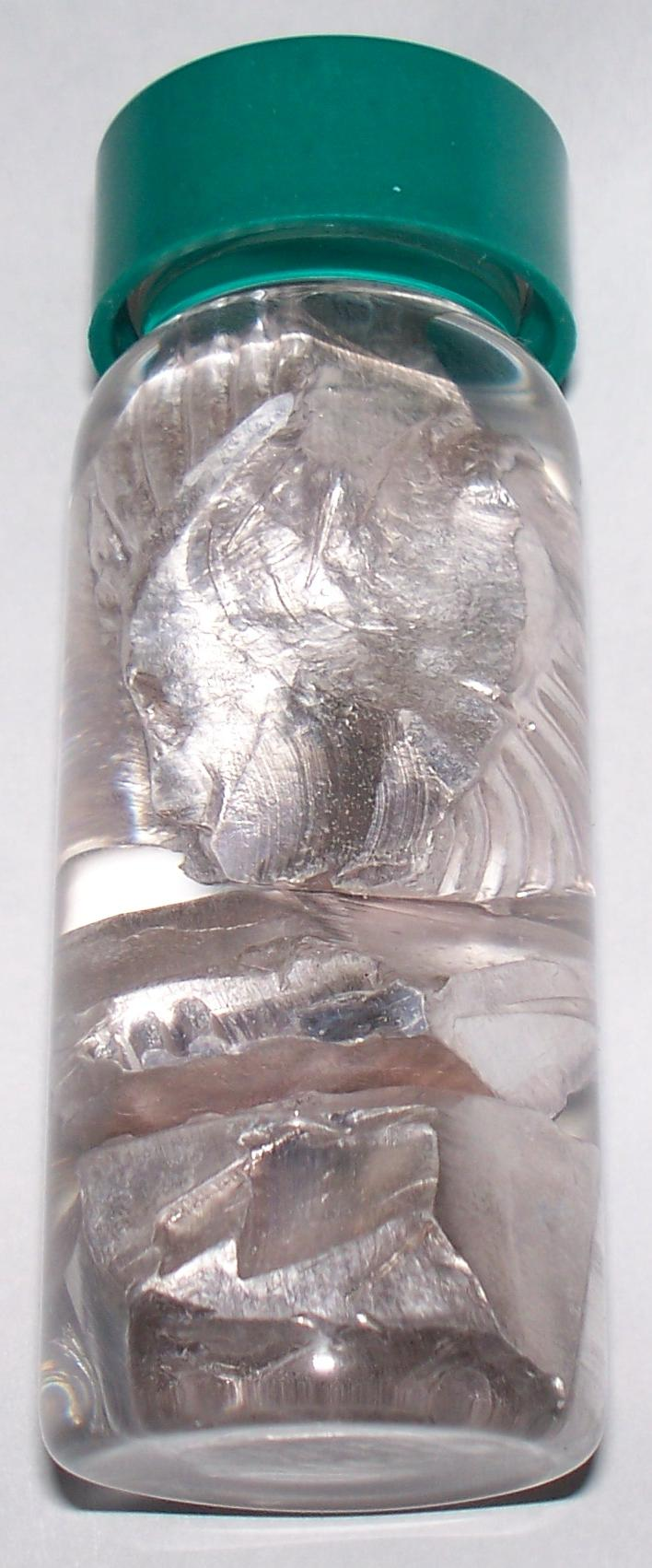
Sodium metal, about 10 g, under oil

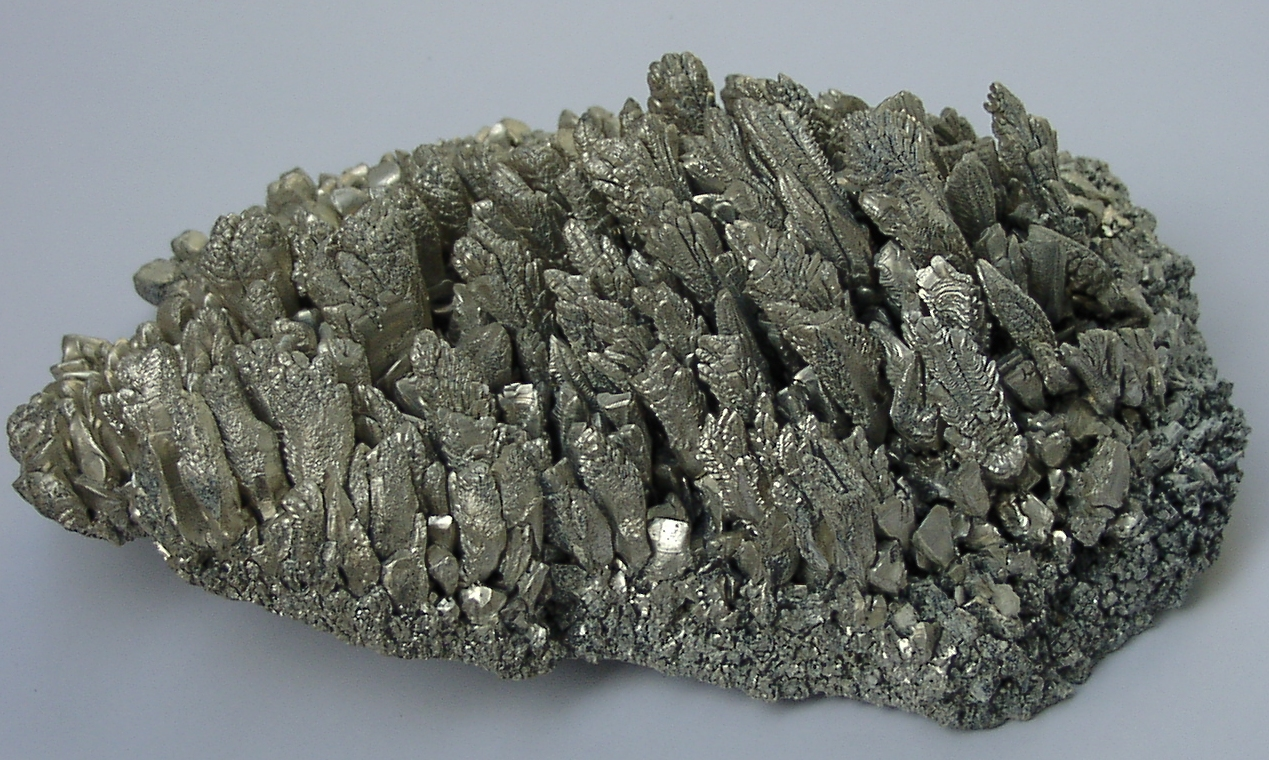
Magnesium metal crystals

==== Potassium and sodium ====
Davy was a pioneer in the field of electrolysis using the voltaic pile to split common compounds and thus prepare many new elements. He went on to electrolyse molten salts and discovered several new metals, including sodium and potassium, highly reactive elements known as the alkali metals. Davy discovered potassium in 1807, deriving it from caustic potash (KOH). Before the 19th century, no distinction had been made between potassium and sodium. Potassium was the first metal that was isolated by electrolysis. Davy isolated sodium in the same year by passing an electric current through molten sodium hydroxide.

==== Barium, calcium, strontium, magnesium, and boron ====
During the first half of 1808, Davy conducted a series of further electrolysis experiments on alkaline earths including lime, magnesia, strontites, and barytes. At the beginning of June, Davy received a letter from the Swedish chemist Berzelius claiming that he, in conjunction with Dr. Pontin, had successfully obtained amalgams of calcium and barium by electrolysing lime and barytes using a mercury cathode. Davy managed to successfully repeat these experiments almost immediately and expanded Berzelius' method to strontites and magnesia. He noted that while these amalgams oxidised in only a few minutes when exposed to air they could be preserved for lengthy periods of time when submerged in naphtha before becoming covered with a white crust.

On 30 June 1808 Davy reported to the Royal Society that he had successfully isolated four new metals which he named barium, calcium, strontium, and magnium (later changed to magnesium) which were subsequently published in the Philosophical Transactions. Although Davy conceded magnium was an "undoubtedly objectionable" name he argued the more appropriate name magnesium was already being applied to metallic manganese and wished to avoid creating an equivocal term. The observations gathered from these experiments also led to Davy isolating boron in 1809. Berzelius called Davy's 1806 Bakerian Lecture On Some Chemical Agencies of Electricity "one of the best memoirs which has ever enriched the theory of chemistry."

Davy performed a number of experiments aimed to isolate the metal aluminium and is credited as the person who named the element. The first name proposed for the metal to be isolated from alum was alumium, which Davy suggested in an 1808 article on his electrochemical research, published in Philosophical Transactions of the Royal Society. It appeared that the name was created from the English word alum and the Latin suffix -ium; but it was customary then to give elements names originating in Latin, so this name was not adopted universally. This name was criticized by contemporary chemists from France, Germany, and Sweden, who insisted the metal should be named for the oxide, alumina, from which it would be isolated. The English name alum does not come directly from Latin, whereas alumine/alumina comes from the Latin word alumen (upon declension, alumen changes to alumin-). The form aluminium, the modern preferred British word, was proposed by January 1811 in an account of Davy's published experiments written by William Hyde Wollaston. Davy later used aluminum (by 1812), which remains the U.S. word.

==== Chlorine ====
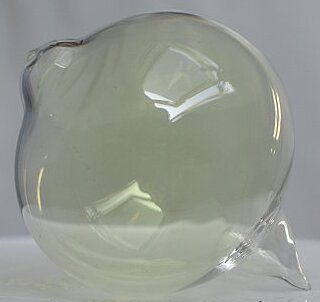
Chlorine

Chlorine was discovered in 1774 by Swedish chemist Carl Wilhelm Scheele, who called it "dephlogisticated marine acid" (see phlogiston theory) and mistakenly thought it contained oxygen. Davy showed that the acid of Scheele's substance, called at the time oxymuriatic acid, contained no oxygen. This discovery overturned Lavoisier's definition of acids as compounds of oxygen. In 1810, chlorine was given its current name by Humphry Davy, who insisted that chlorine was in fact an element. The name chlorine, chosen by Davy for "one of [the substance's] obvious and characteristic properties – its colour", comes from the Greek χλωρος (chlōros), meaning green-yellow.

==== Laboratory incident ====
Davy seriously injured himself in a laboratory accident with nitrogen trichloride. French chemist Pierre Louis Dulong had first prepared this compound in 1811, and had lost two fingers and an eye in two separate explosions with it. In a letter to John Children, on 16 November 1812, Davy wrote: "It must be used with great caution. It is not safe to experiment upon a globule larger than a pin's head. I have been severely wounded by a piece scarcely bigger. My sight, however, I am informed, will not be injured". Davy's accident induced him to hire Michael Faraday as a co-worker, particularly for assistance with handwriting and record keeping. They were both injured in another NCl_{3} explosion shortly thereafter. He had recovered from his injuries by April 1813.

=== Travels ===
==== European tour ====
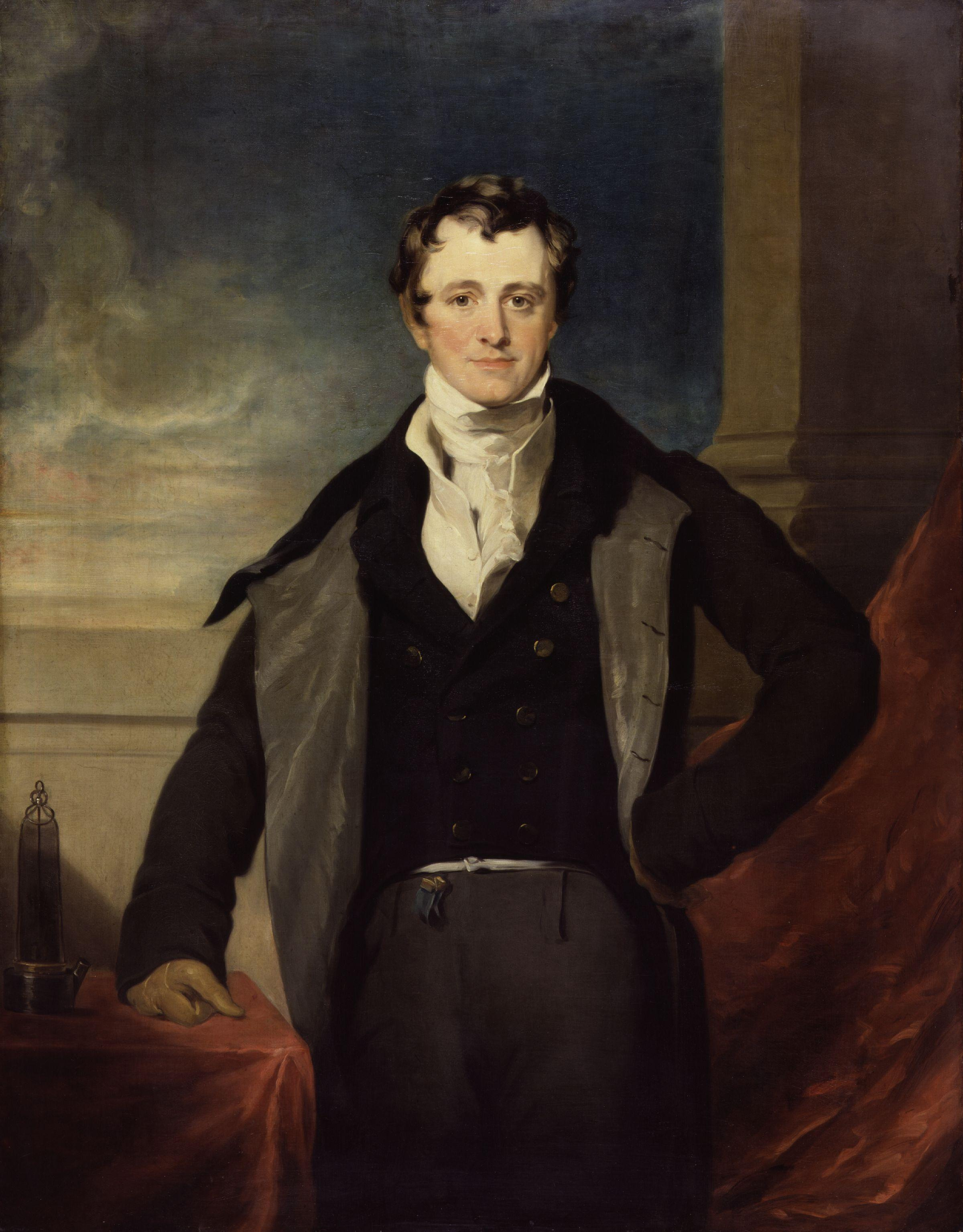
Portrait of Sir Humphry Davy by Thomas Lawrence, 1821

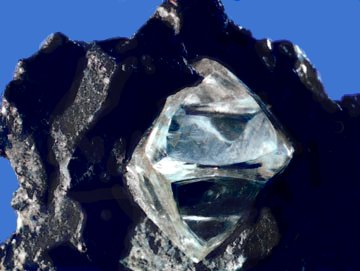
A diamond crystal in its matrix

In 1812, Davy was knighted and gave up his lecturing position at the Royal Institution. He was given the title of Honorary Professor of Chemistry. He gave a farewell lecture to the Institution, and married a wealthy widow, Jane Apreece. (While Davy was generally acknowledged as being faithful to his wife, their relationship was stormy, and in later years he travelled to continental Europe alone.)

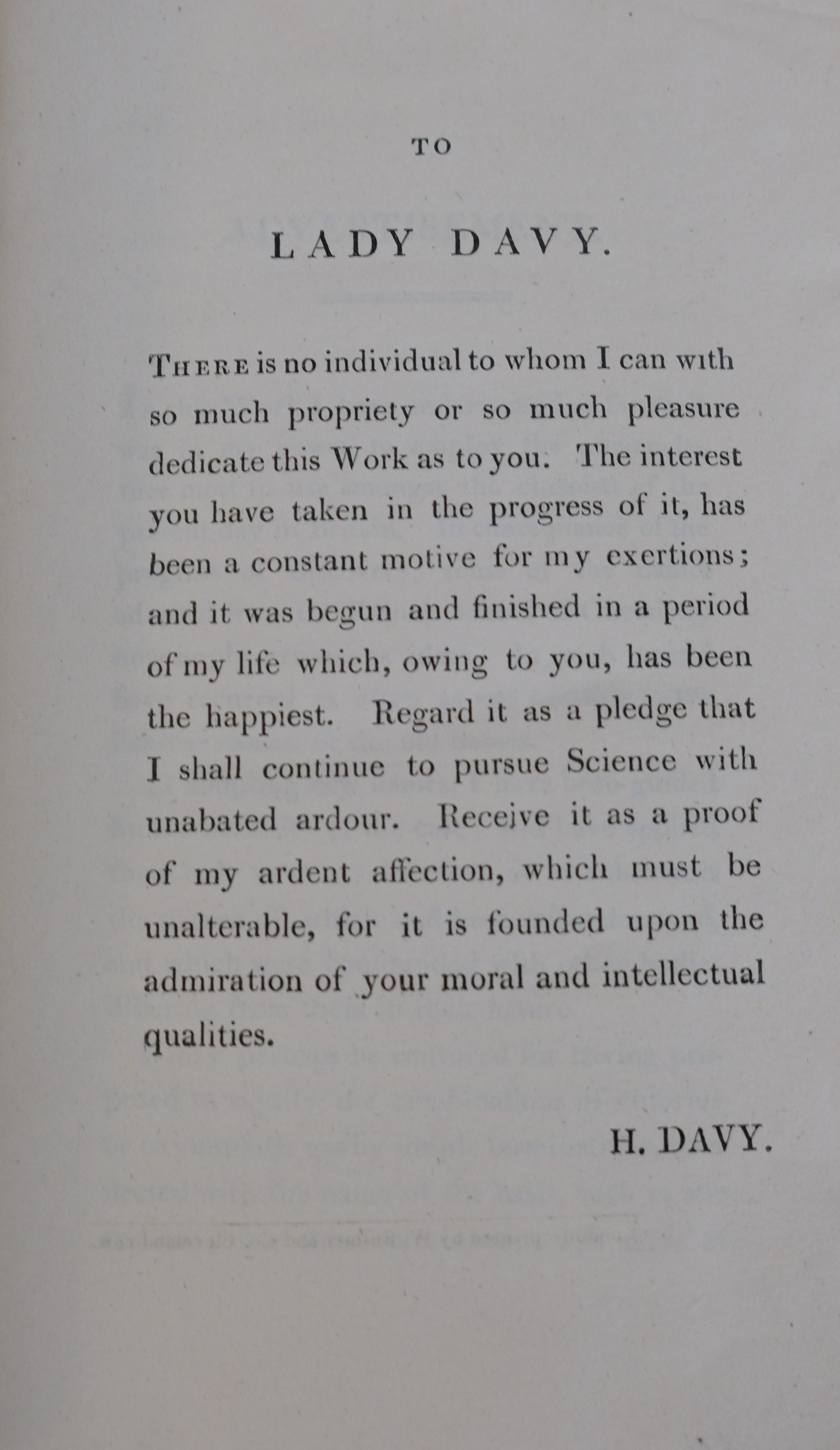
Dedication page of an 1812 copy of "Elements of Chemical Philosophy," which Davy dedicated to his wife

Davy then published his Elements of Chemical Philosophy, part 1, volume 1, though other parts of this title were never completed. He made notes for a second edition, but it was never required. In October 1813, he and his wife, accompanied by Michael Faraday as his scientific assistant (also treated as a valet), travelled to France to collect the second edition of the prix du Galvanisme, a medal that Napoleon Bonaparte had awarded Davy for his electro-chemical work. Faraday noted "Tis indeed a strange venture at this time, to trust ourselves in a foreign and hostile country, where so little regard is had to protestations of honour, that the slightest suspicion would be sufficient to separate us for ever from England, and perhaps from life". Davy's party sailed from Plymouth to Morlaix by cartel, where they were searched.

Upon reaching Paris, Davy was a guest of honour at a meeting of the First Class of the Institut de France and met with André-Marie Ampère and other French chemists. It was later reported that Davy's wife had thrown the medal into the sea, near her Cornish home, "as it raised bad memories". The Royal Society of Chemistry has offered over £1,800 for the recovery of the medal.

While in Paris, Davy attended lectures at the Ecole Polytechnique, including those by Joseph Louis Gay-Lussac on a mysterious substance isolated by Bernard Courtois. Davy wrote a paper for the Royal Society on the element, which is now called iodine. This led to a dispute between Davy and Gay-Lussac on who had the priority on the research.

Davy's party did not meet Napoleon in person, but they did visit the Empress Joséphine de Beauharnais at the Château de Malmaison. The party left Paris in December 1813, travelling south to Italy. They sojourned in Florence, where using the burning glass of the Grand Duke of Tuscany in a series of experiments conducted with Faraday's assistance, Davy succeeded in using the sun's rays to ignite diamond, proving it is composed of pure carbon.

Davy's party continued to Rome, where he undertook experiments on iodine and chlorine and on the colours used in ancient paintings. This was the first chemical research on the pigments used by artists.

He also visited Naples and Mount Vesuvius, where he collected samples of crystals. By June 1814, they were in Milan, where they met Alessandro Volta, and then continued north to Geneva. They returned to Italy via Munich and Innsbruck, and when their plans to travel to Greece and Istanbul were abandoned after Napoleon's escape from Elba, they returned to England.

After the Battle of Waterloo, Davy wrote to Lord Liverpool urging that the French be treated with severity:

My Lord, I need not say to Your Lordship that the capitulation of Paris not a treaty; lest everything belonging to the future state of that capital & of France is open to discussion & that France is a conquered country. It is the duty of the allies to give her more restricted boundaries which shall not encroach upon the natural limits of other nations. to weaken her on the side of Italy, Germany & Flanders. To take back from her by contributions the wealth she has acquired by them to suffer her to retain nothing that the republican or imperial armies have stolen: This last duty is demanded no less by policy than justice.

— Sir Humphry Davy, Letter to Lord Liverpool

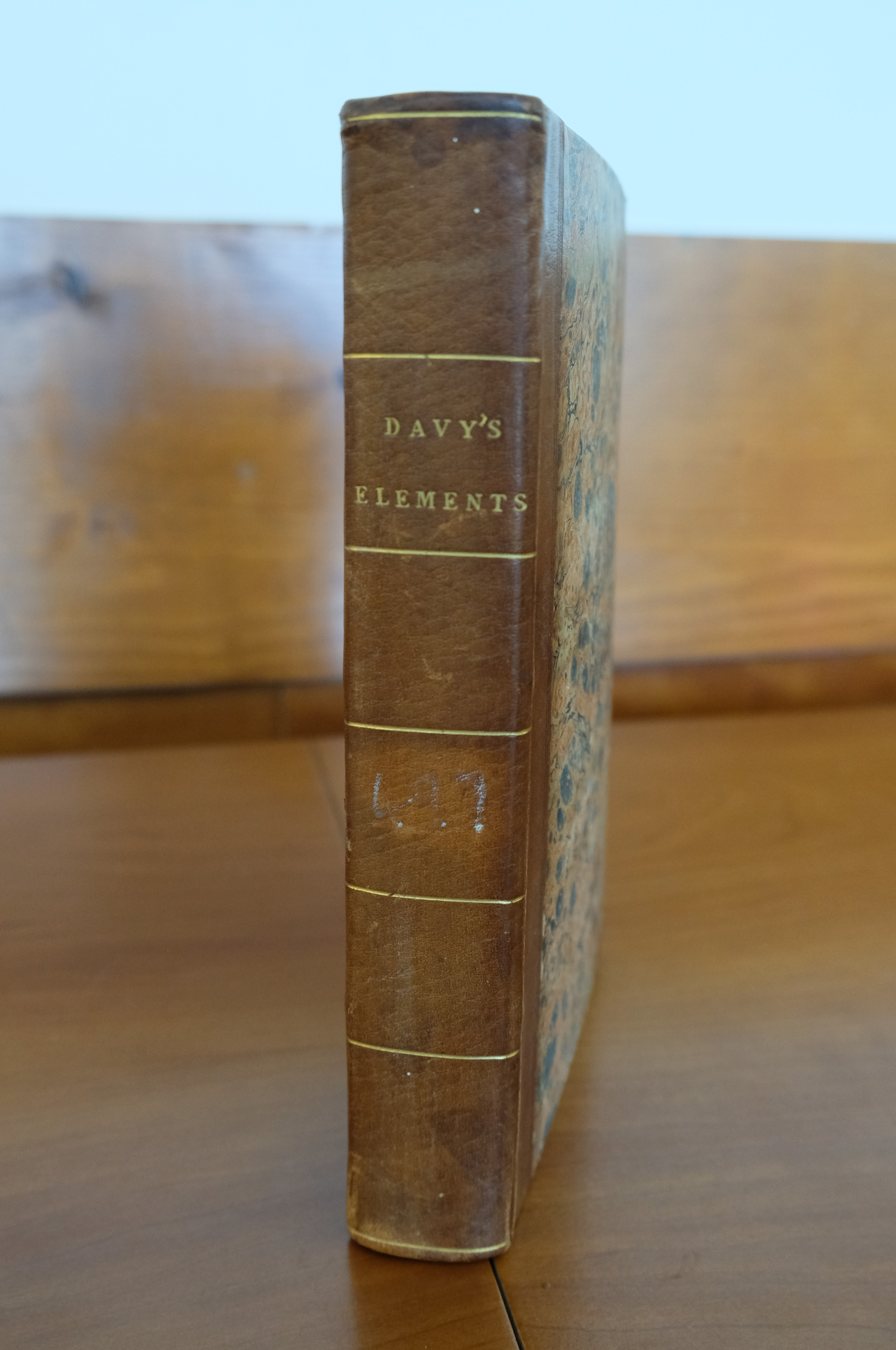
1812 copy of "Elements of Chemical Philosophy"

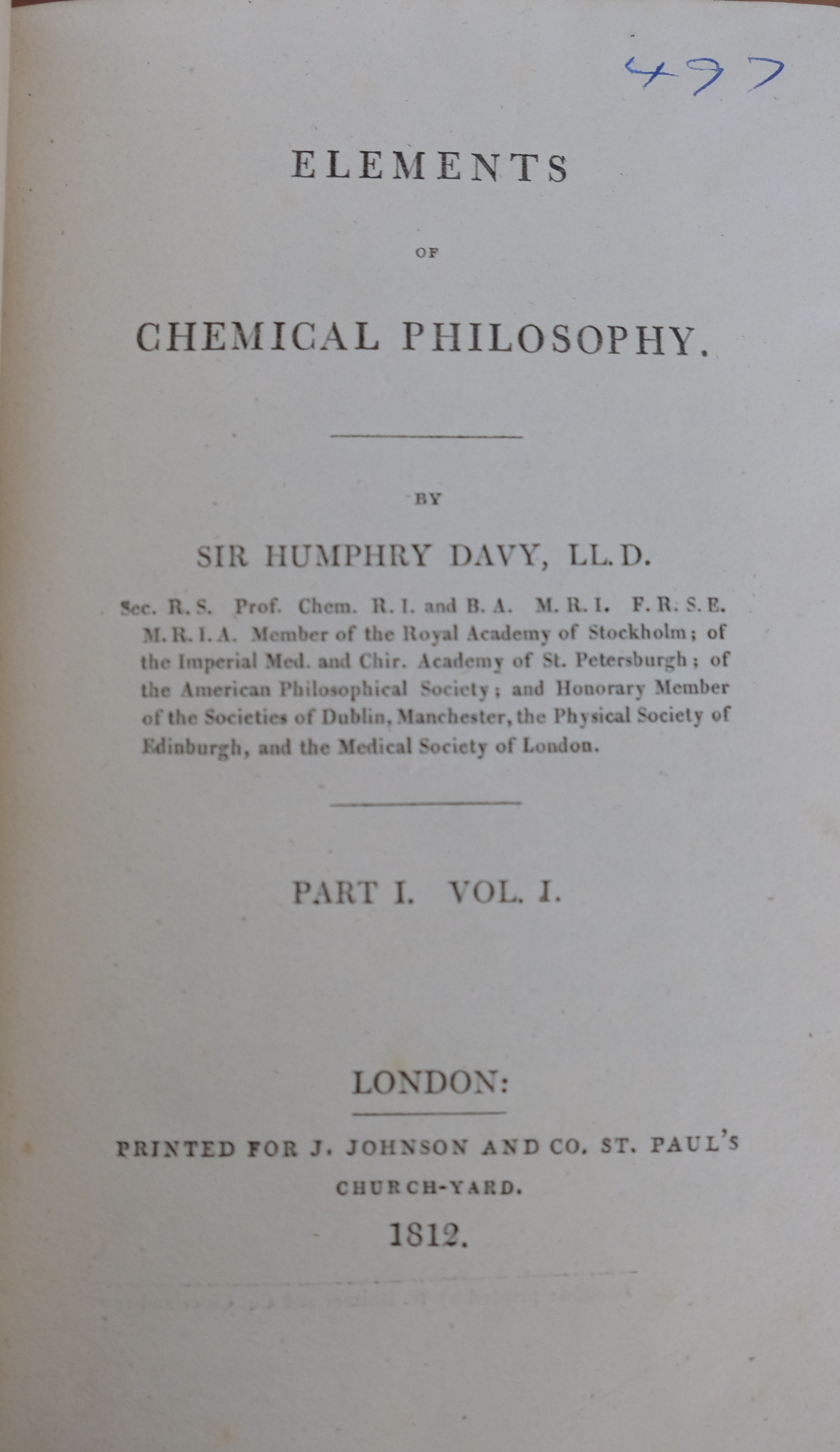
Title page of an 1812 copy of "Elements of Chemical Philosophy"

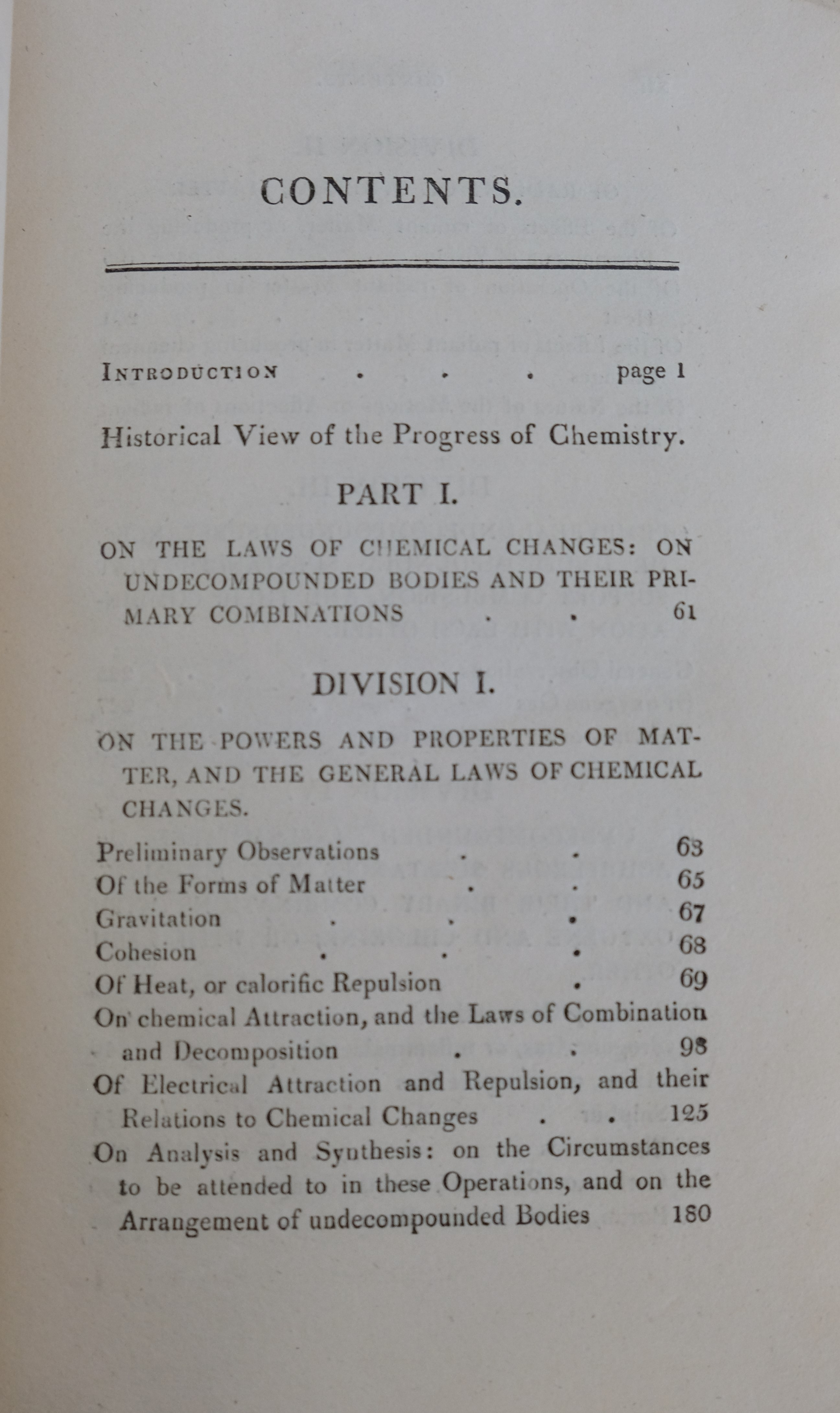
Table of contents page of an 1812 copy of "Elements of Chemical Philosophy"

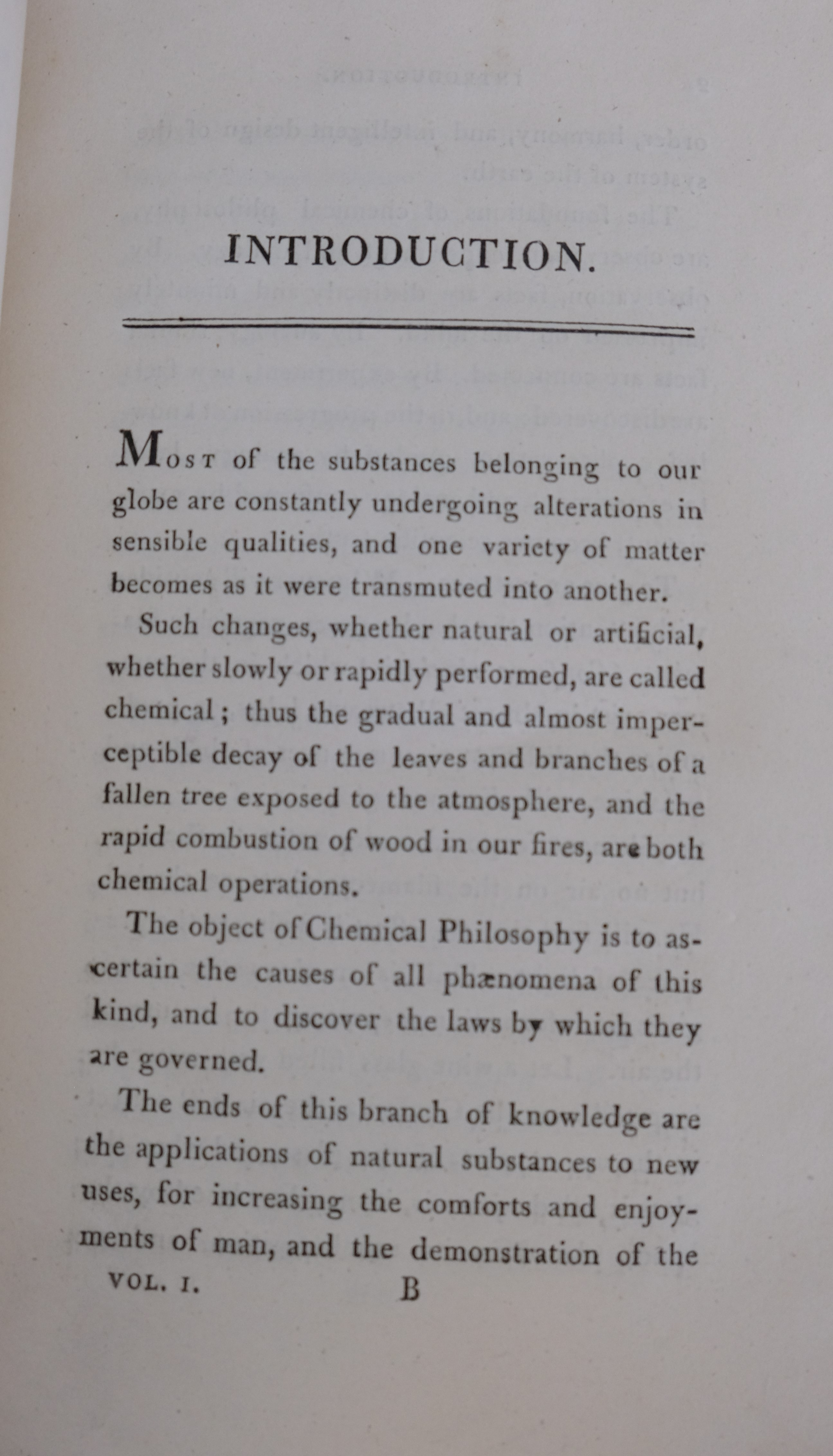
Introduction of an 1812 copy of "Elements of Chemical Philosophy"

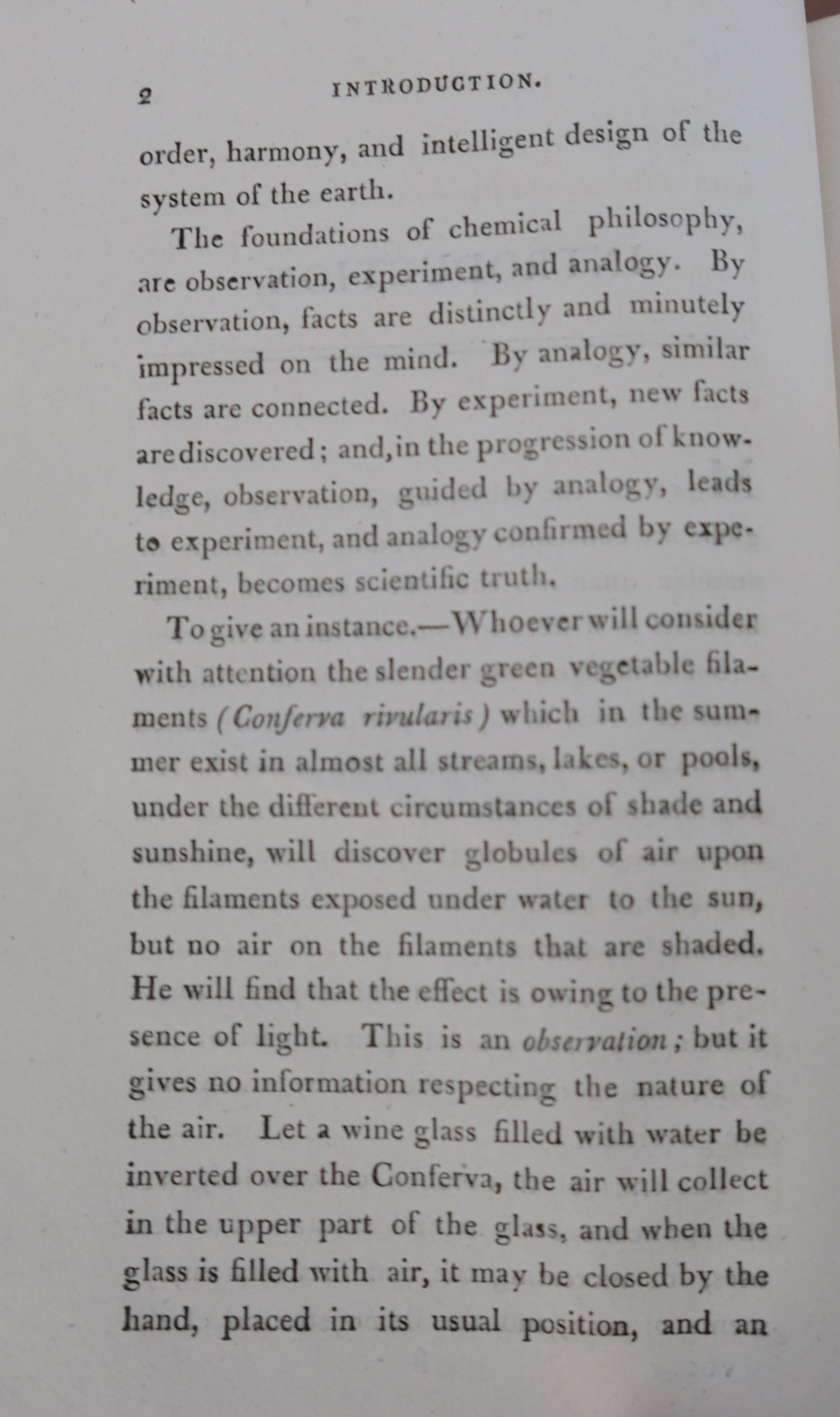
Introduction (continued) of an 1812 copy of "Elements of Chemical Philosophy"

=== Davy lamp ===
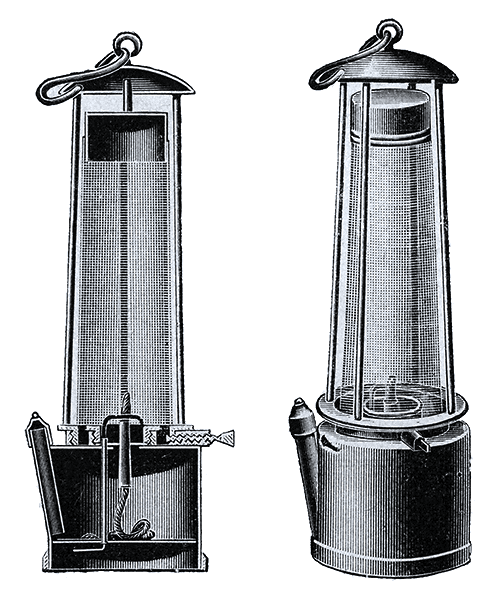
The Davy lamp

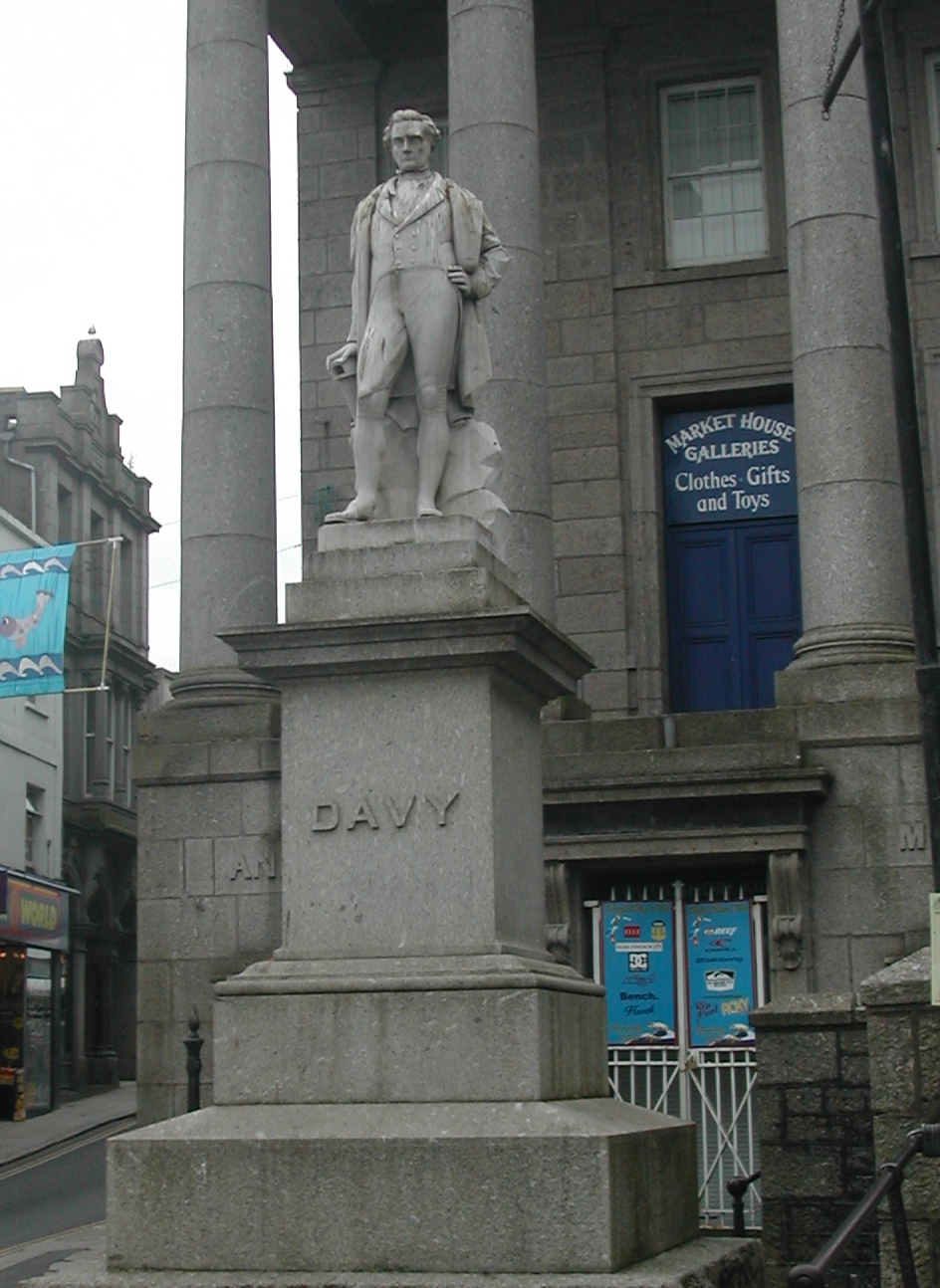
Statue of Davy in Penzance, Cornwall, holding his safety lamp

After his return to England in 1815, Davy began experimenting with lamps that could be used safely in coal mines. The Revd Dr Robert Gray of Bishopwearmouth in Sunderland, founder of the Society for Preventing Accidents in Coalmines, had written to Davy suggesting that he might use his 'extensive stores of chemical knowledge' to address the issue of mining explosions caused by firedamp, or methane mixed with oxygen, which was often ignited by the open flames of the lamps then used by miners. Incidents such as the Felling mine disaster of 1812 near Newcastle, in which 92 men were killed, not only caused great loss of life among miners but also meant that their widows and children had to be supported by the public purse. The Revd Gray and a fellow clergyman also working in a north-east mining area, John Hodgson of Jarrow, were keen that action should be taken to improve underground lighting and especially the lamps used by miners.

Davy conceived of using an iron gauze to enclose a lamp's flame, and so prevent the methane burning inside the lamp from passing out to the general atmosphere. Although the idea of the safety lamp had already been demonstrated by William Reid Clanny and by the then unknown (but later very famous) engineer George Stephenson, Davy's use of wire gauze to prevent the spread of flame was used by many other inventors in their later designs. George Stephenson's lamp was very popular in the north-east coalfields, and used the same principle of preventing the flame reaching the general atmosphere, but by different means. Unfortunately, although the new design of gauze lamp initially did seem to offer protection, it gave much less light, and quickly deteriorated in the wet conditions of most pits. Rusting of the gauze quickly made the lamp unsafe, and the number of deaths from firedamp explosions rose yet further.

There was some discussion as to whether Davy had discovered the principles behind his lamp without the help of the work of Smithson Tennant, but it was generally agreed that the work of the two men had been independent. Davy refused to patent the lamp, and its invention led to his being awarded the Rumford medal in 1816.Colliery Trial: The lamp was first successfully tested in a real-world mining environment on January 9, 1816, at Hebburn Colliery in North East England.

==== Acid studies ====
In 1815 Davy suggested that acids are substances that contain replaceable hydrogen ions; that is, hydrogen that could be partly or totally replaced by reactive metals which are placed above hydrogen in the reactivity series. When acids react with metals they form salts and hydrogen gas. Bases are substances that react with acids to form salts and water. These definitions worked well for most of the nineteenth century.

=== Herculaneum papyri ===
Davy experimented on fragments of the Herculaneum papyri before his departure to Naples in 1818. His early experiments showed hope of success. In his report to the Royal Society Davy writes that: 'When a fragment of a brown MS. in which the layers were strongly adhered, was placed in an atmosphere of chlorine, there was an immediate action, the papyrus smoked and became yellow, and the letters appeared much more distinct; and by the application of heat the layers separated from each other, giving fumes of hydrochloric acid (also known as muriatic acid).'

The success of the early trials prompted Davy to travel to Naples to conduct further research on the Herculaneum papyri. Accompanied by his wife, they set off on 26 May 1818 to stay in Flanders where Davy was invited by the coal miners to speak. They then traveled to Carniola (now Slovenia) which proved to become 'his favourite Alpine retreat' before finally arriving in Italy. In Italy, they befriended Lord Byron in Rome and then went on to travel to Naples.

Initial experiments were again promising and his work resulted in 'partially unrolling 23 MSS., from which fragments of writing were obtained' but after returning to Naples on 1 December 1819 from a summer in the Alps, Davy complained that 'the Italians at the museum [were] no longer helpful but obstructive'. Davy renounced further work on the papyri because 'the labour, in itself difficult and unpleasant, been made more so, by the conduct of the persons at the head of this department in the Museum'.

== Later life: 1820–1829 ==
=== President of the Royal Society ===
==== Election to the presidency ====
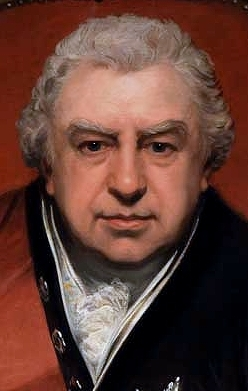
Joseph Banks

On 20 October 1818, Davy was created a baronet; this was the first such honour conferred on a man of science in Britain. It was followed a year later with the presidency of the Royal Society. The Society was in transition from a club for gentlemen interested in natural philosophy, connected with the political and social elite, to an academy representing increasingly specialised sciences. The previous president, Joseph Banks, had held the post for over 40 years and had presided autocratically over what David Philip Miller calls the "Banksian Learned Empire", in which natural history was prominent. Banks had groomed Davies Gilbert to succeed him and preserve the status quo, but Gilbert declined to stand. Fellows who thought royal patronage was important proposed Prince Leopold of Saxe-Coburg (later Leopold I of Belgium), who also withdrew, as did the Whig Edward St Maur, 11th Duke of Somerset. Davy was the outstanding scientist but some fellows did not approve of his popularising work at the Royal Institution.

Elections took place on St Andrew's Day and Davy was elected on 30 November 1820. Although he was unopposed, other candidates had received initial backing. These candidates embodied the factional difficulties that beset Davy's presidency and which eventually defeated him. The strongest alternative had been William Hyde Wollaston, who was supported by the "Cambridge Network" of outstanding mathematicians such as Charles Babbage and John Herschel, who tried to block Davy. They were aware that Davy supported some modernisation, but thought that he would not sufficiently encourage aspiring young mathematicians, astronomers, and geologists, who were beginning to form specialist societies. Davy was only 41, and reformers were fearful of another long presidency.

In his early years Davy was optimistic about reconciling the reformers and the Banksians. In his first speech as president he declared, "I trust that, with these new societies, we shall always preserve the most amicable relations ... I am sure there is no desire in [the Royal Society] to exert anything like patriarchal authority in relation to these institutions".

==== Protection of ships' bottoms ====
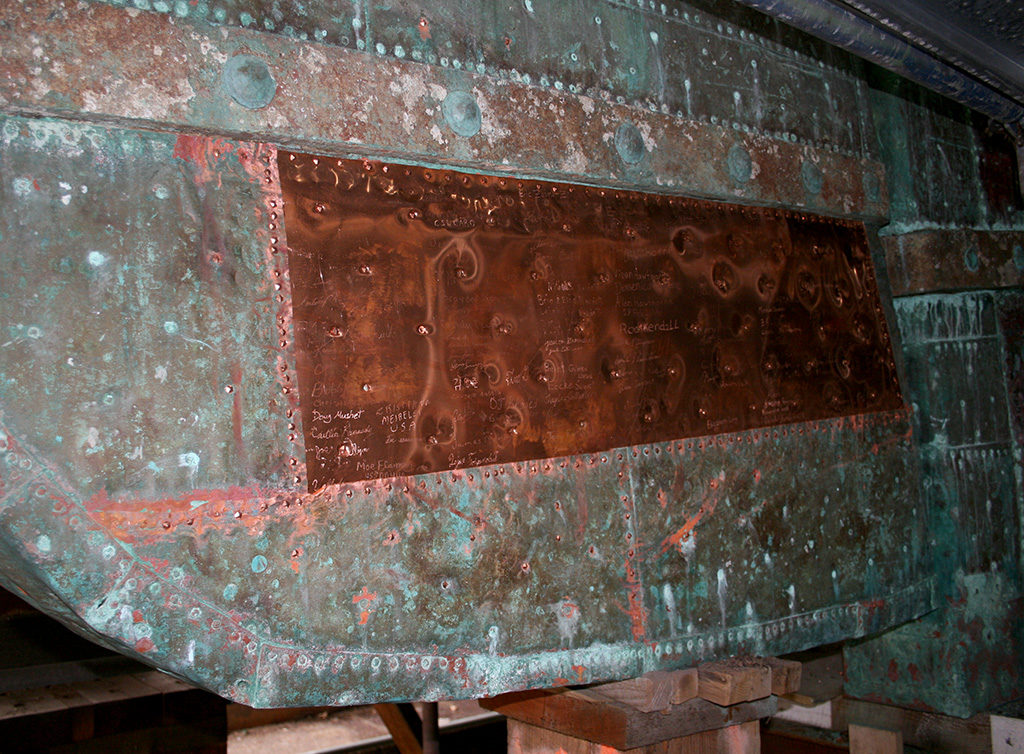
New piece of copper sheathing surrounded by old, corroded copper on USS Constitution

From 1761 onward, copper plating had been fitted to the undersides of Royal Navy ships to protect the wood from attack by shipworms. However, the copper bottoms were gradually corroded by exposure to the salt water. Between 1823 and 1825, Davy, assisted by Michael Faraday, attempted to protect the copper by electrochemical means. He attached to the copper sacrificial pieces of zinc or iron, which provided cathodic protection to the host metal. It was discovered, however, that protected copper became foul quickly, i.e. pieces of weed and/or marine creatures became attached to the hull, which had a detrimental effect on the handling of the ship.

The Navy Board approached Davy in 1823, asking for help with the corrosion. Davy conducted a number of tests in Portsmouth Dockyard, which led to the Navy Board adopting the use of Davy's "protectors". By 1824, it had become apparent that fouling of the copper bottoms was occurring on the majority of protected ships. By the end of 1825, the Admiralty ordered the Navy Board to cease fitting the protectors to sea-going ships, and to remove those that had already been fitted. Davy's scheme was seen as a public failure, despite success of the corrosion protection as such. As Frank A. J. L. James explains, "[Because] the poisonous salts from [corroding] copper were no longer entering the water, there was nothing to kill the barnacles and the like in the vicinity of a ship. This meant that barnacles [and the like] could now attach themselves to the bottom of a vessel, thus impeding severely its steerage, much to the anger of the captains who wrote to the Admiralty to complain about Davy's protectors."

==== Presidency ====
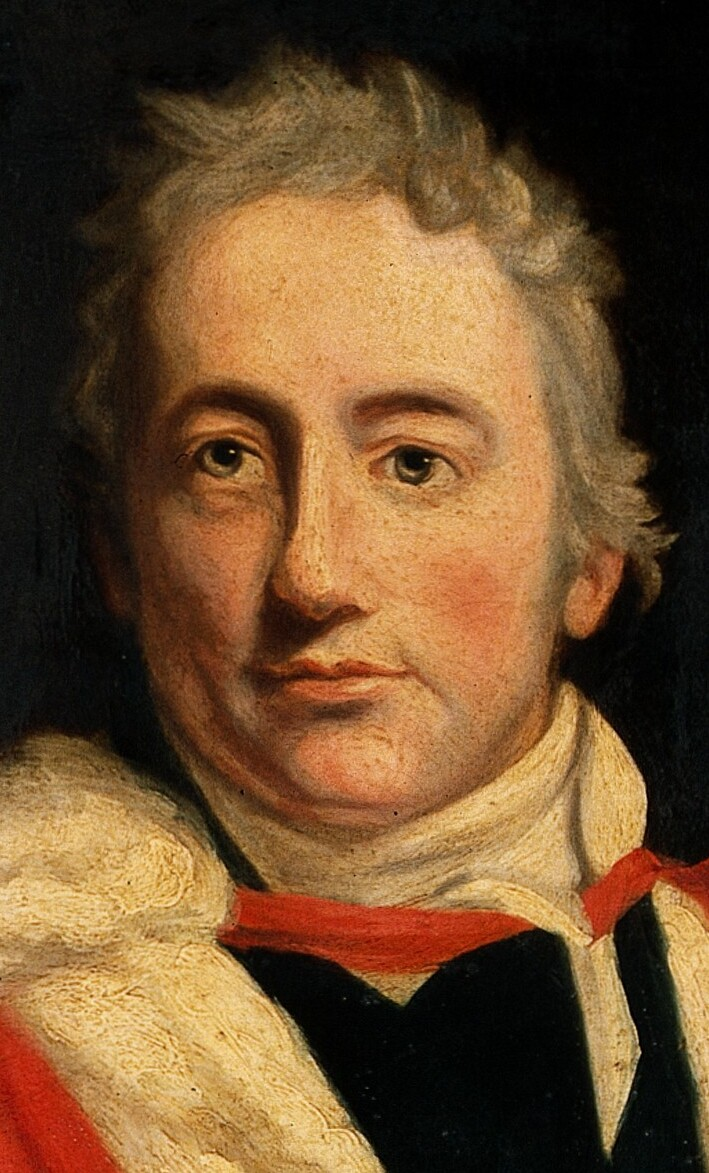
Humphry Davy

Davy spent much time juggling the factions but, as his reputation declined in the light of failures such as his research into copper-bottomed ships, he lost popularity and authority. This was compounded by a number of political errors. In 1825 his promotion of the new Zoological Society, of which he was a founding fellow, courted the landed gentry and alienated expert zoologists. He offended the mathematicians and reformers by failing to ensure that Babbage received one of the new Royal Medals (a project of his) or the vacant secretaryship of the Society in 1826. In 1826 Davy suffered a stroke from which he never fully recovered. In November 1826 the mathematician Edward Ryan recorded that: "The Society, every member almost ... are in the greatest rage at the President's proceedings and nothing is now talked of but removing him."

He was again re-elected unopposed, but he was now visibly unwell. In January 1827 he set off to Italy for reasons of his health. It did not improve and, as the 1827 election loomed, it was clear that he would not stand again. He was succeeded by Davies Gilbert.

=== Final years ===
Portrait of Michael Faraday by Thomas Phillips c. 1841–1842

Davy's laboratory assistant, Michael Faraday, went on to enhance Davy's work and would become the more famous and influential scientist. Davy is supposed to have even claimed Faraday as his greatest discovery. Davy later accused Faraday of plagiarism, however, causing Faraday (the first Fullerian Professor of Chemistry) to cease all research in electromagnetism until his mentor's death.

The preceding paragraph may be unduly charitable to Davy. The accusation by Davy of plagiarism by Faraday occurred already in 1821, regarding Faraday's first major discovery independent of Davy, of electromagnetic rotation (the first electric motor). According to Geoffrey Cantor's 1991 biography of Faraday, this dubious accusation was Davy's "final bid to dominate Faraday.... Davy, resenting the success of his earnest and hardworking assistant, was trying to keep him down. Master and servant were in direct competition and their rivalry may have motivated Davy's attempt to block Faraday's membership of the Royal Society. .... Although Davy was unsuccessful in preventing Faraday's membership, this incident proved a turning point in their relationship." Other sources report the jibe that "Davy's greatest discovery was Faraday" as a cruel joke at Davy's expense, not a gracious acknowledgment by Davy himself of Faraday's greater scientific achievements.

Of a sanguine, somewhat irritable temperament, Davy displayed characteristic enthusiasm and energy in all his pursuits. According to June Z. Fullmer, one of Davy's biographers, he was a deist. As is shown by his verses and sometimes by his prose, his mind was highly imaginative; the poet Coleridge declared that if he "had not been the first chemist, he would have been the first poet of his age", and Southey said that "he had all the elements of a poet; he only wanted the art." In spite of his ungainly exterior and peculiar manner, his happy gifts of exposition and illustration won him extraordinary popularity as a lecturer, his experiments were ingenious and rapidly performed, and Coleridge went to hear him "to increase his stock of metaphors." The dominating ambition of his life was to achieve fame; occasional petty jealousy did not diminish his concern for the "cause of humanity", to use a phrase often employed by him in connection with his invention of the miners' lamp. Careless about etiquette, his frankness sometimes exposed him to annoyances he might have avoided by the exercise of tact.

=== Death ===
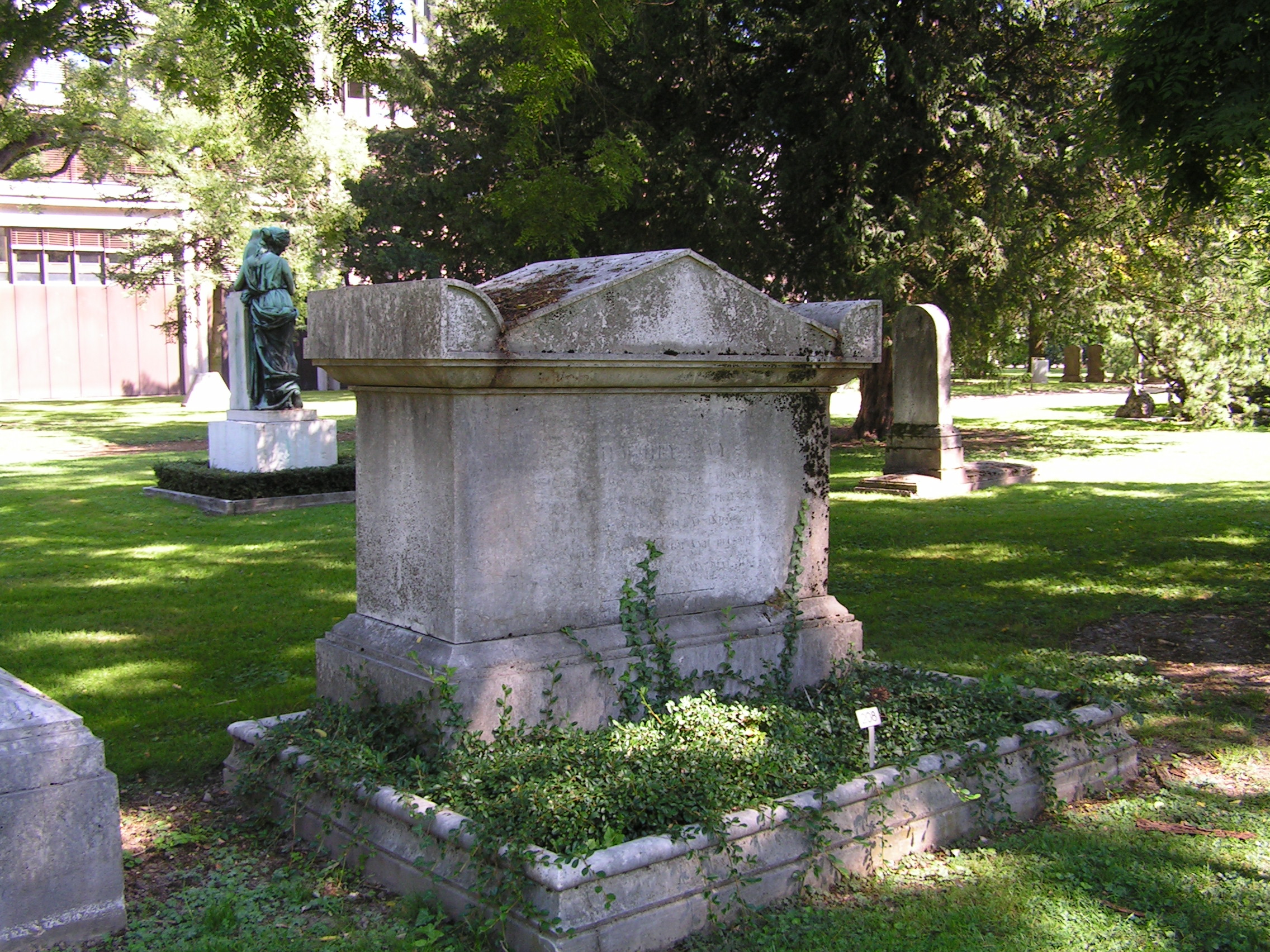
Davy's grave at Cimetière Plainpalais in Geneva, Switzerland

Davy spent the last months of his life writing Consolations in Travel, an immensely popular, somewhat amorphous compendium of poetry, and thoughts on science and philosophy. Published posthumously, the work became a staple of both scientific and family libraries for several decades afterward. Davy spent the winter in Rome, hunting in the Campagna on his fiftieth birthday. But on 20 February 1829 he had another stroke. After spending many months attempting to recuperate, Davy died in a room at L'Hôtel de la Couronne, in the Rue du Rhône, in Geneva, Switzerland, on 29 May 1829. An appendix to his will had included his last wishes; that there be no post-mortem, that he be buried where he died, and that there be an interval between the two, to ensure that he was not merely comatose. But the ordinances of the city did not allow such an interval and his funeral took place on the following Monday, 1 June, in the Cimetière des Rois, then outside the city walls, now in the Plainpalais district of Geneva.

== Honours ==
=== Geographical locations ===
- Shortly after his funeral, his wife organised a memorial tablet for him in Westminster Abbey at a cost of £142.
- In 1872, a statue of Davy was erected in front of the Market Building, Penzance, (now owned by Lloyds TSB) at the top of Market Jew Street, Penzance.
- A commemorative slate plaque on 4 Market Jew Street, Penzance, claims the location as his birthplace. A secondary school in Coombe Road, Penzance, is named Humphry Davy School.
- A pub at 32 Alverton Street, Penzance, is named "The Sir Humphry Davy".
- One of the science buildings of the University of Plymouth is named The Davy Building.
- There is a road named Humphry Davy Way adjacent to the docks in Bristol.
- Outside the entrance to Sunderland Football Club's Stadium of Light stands a giant Davy Lamp, in recognition of local mining heritage and the importance of Davy's safety lamp to the mining industry.
- There is a street named Humphry-Davy-Straße in the industrial quarter of the town of Cuxhaven, Schleswig-Holstein, Germany.
- A satellite of the University of Sheffield at Golden Smithies Lane in Wath upon Dearne (Manvers) was called Humphry Davy House and was home to the School of Nursing and Midwifery until April 2009.
- Davy Sound in Greenland was named in his honour by William Scoresby (1789–1857).
- There is a 'zone of activity' commercial area in La Grand-Combe, Gard, France, a former mining town, named after Davy.
- Mount Davy in New Zealand's Paparoa Range was named after him by Julius von Haast.

=== Scientific and literary recognition ===
- in 1827, the mineral davyne was named in his honour by W. Haidinger.
- Annually since 1877, the Royal Society of London has awarded the Davy Medal "for an outstandingly important recent discovery in any branch of chemistry."
- The Davy lunar crater is named after him. It has a diameter of 34 km and its coordinates are 11.8S, 8.1W.
- Davy's passion for fly-fishing earned him the informal title "the father of modern fly-fishing", and his book Salmonia is often considered to be "the fly-fisherman bible".
- The poet Samuel Taylor Coleridge said he "attended Davy's lectures to enlarge my stock of metaphors".

== In popular culture ==
=== Novels and poetry ===
- Davy is the subject of a humorous song by Richard Gendall, recorded in 1980 by folk-singer Brenda Wootton in the album Boy Jan Cornishman, the seven verses of which each recall a day of the week on which Davy purportedly made a particular discovery.
- Cornish playwright Nick Darke wrote Laughing Gas (2005) a comedy script about the life of Sir Humphry Davy, unfinished at the time of Nick Darke's death; completed posthumously by actor and playwright Carl Grose and produced by the Truro-based production company o-region.
- Edmund Clerihew Bentley's first clerihew, published in 1905, was written about Sir Humphry Davy:

Sir Humphry Davy
Abominated gravy.
He lived in the odium
Of having discovered sodium.

- There is a humorous rhyme of unknown origin about the statue in Penzance:

Sir Humphrey Davy's kindly face,
Is turned away from Market Place
Towards St Michael's Mount
So, if he do want to tell the time
He've got to wait till the clock do chime
Then he's forced to count.

- Jules Verne refers to Davy's geological theories in his 1864 novel Journey to the Centre of the Earth.

== Publications ==
See Fullmer's work for a full list of Davy's articles.

Humphry Davy's books are as follows:

- — (1800). Researches, Chemical and Philosophical; Chiefly Concerning Nitrous Oxide, or Dephlogisticated Nitrous Air, and Its Respiration. Bristol: Biggs and Cottle. p. 1.
- — (1812). Elements of Chemical Philosophy. London: Johnson and Co. p. 1. ISBN 978-0-217-88947-6.
- — (1813). Elements of Agricultural Chemistry in a Course of Lectures. London: Longman.
- — (1816). The Papers of Sir H. Davy. Newcastle: Emerson Charnley. (on Davy's safety lamp)
- — (1827). Discourses to the Royal Society. London: John Murray.
- — (1828). Salmonia or Days of Fly Fishing. London: John Murray. p. 13.
- — (1830). Consolations in Travel or The Last Days of a Philosopher. London: John Murray. p. 1.

Davy also contributed articles on chemistry to Rees's Cyclopædia, but the topics are not known.

His collected works were published in 1839–1840:

- Davy, John (1839–1840). The Collected Works of Sir Humphry Davy. London: Smith, Elder, and Company. ISBN 978-0-217-88944-5.

== See also ==
- List of presidents of the Royal Society

Baronetage of the United Kingdom
New creation	Baronet (of Grosvenor Street); 1818–1829	Extinct
Preceded by Tierney baronets	Davy baronets of Grosvenor Street; 30 November 1818	Succeeded by Maitland baronets
Professional and academic associations
Preceded by William Hyde Wollaston	23rd President of the Royal Society; 1820–1827	Succeeded by Davies Gilbert
