= St Erme =

Coordinates: 50.314°N 5.032°W

St Erme: Cornish: Egloserm
- Location within Cornwall
- Population: 1,363
- OS grid reference: SW842503
- Unitary authority: Cornwall
- Ceremonial county: Cornwall
- Region: South West
- Country: England
- Sovereign state: United Kingdom
- Post town: TRURO
- Postcode district: TR4
- Dialling code: 01872
- Police: Devon and Cornwall
- Fire: Cornwall
- Ambulance: South Western
- UK Parliament: Truro & Falmouth

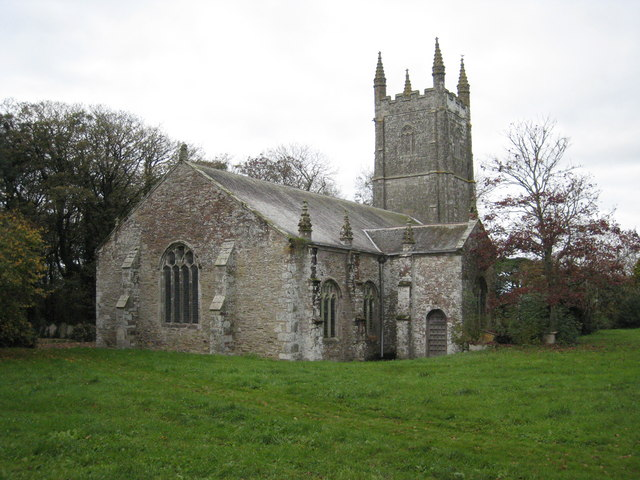
St Erme church

St Erme (Cornish: Egloserm (village), Pluw Erm (parish)) is a civil parish and village in Cornwall, in the United Kingdom. The parish of St Erme, has a population of approximately 1200. This had increased to 1,363 in 2011. Trispen is a small village within the parish.

Trispen (Cornish: Tredhespan) has a Post Office contained within the local Premier convenience store.

== Parish Church of St Hermes ==
St Hermes' Church, St Erme was rebuilt in 1819-20 by John Foulston (apart from the tower which is medieval). The font is Norman and there is a brass of 1596 to R. Trencreek and family. According to Charles Henderson "The long incumbencies of two wealthy and scholarly rectors in the 18th century reduced the fabric of the church to such a ruinous condition that it had to be rebuilt in 1820, when a new plan was unhappily chosen. Efforts were made to reconcile this with older work in 1908."

The Reverend Dr. Cornelius Cardew (d. 1831) served as curate and as rector of the parish altogether for 60 years and his portrait is in the church.

== Historic estates ==
- Killigrew Manor in the parish of St Erme was the earliest recorded seat of the Killigrew family of Arwenack which founded the town of Falmouth and of which several members served as Governor of Pendennis Castle.The Killigrews sold the manor to John Michell of Truro, M.P., Mayor of Truro and Falmouth, a close relation through marriage.

== St Erme with Trispen Community Primary School ==
St Erme with Trispen Community Primary School caters for boys and girls from three to eleven years of age. The headteacher is Mrs Julie Orrell. The present building opened in November 1987, the school being founded in 1877. Built as a four class school with large hall, library, practical work areas, quiet room, changing rooms with showers, well equipped kitchen, a fifth classroom was added in 1999 to accommodate the growing number of pupils. An ICT room has recently been installed, providing the opportunity both for the teaching of Information Communication Technology and its application across the curriculum. There are around one hundred and ten children on the school roll, divided into four classes, as far as possible by age. A Foundation Stage Unit for 3 and 4 year old pupils operates during morning sessions.

== Cornish wrestling ==
Cornish wrestling tournaments, for prizes, were held in St Erme in the 1800s.
