= Cornelius Cardew (clergy) =

British clergyman

The Reverend Cornelius Cardew
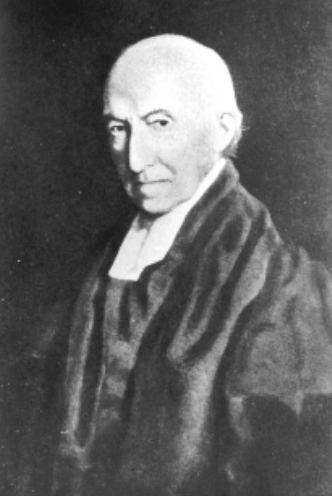
- Born: February 13, 1748; Liskeard, Cornwall, England
- Died: September 18, 1831 (aged 83); Rockbeare, Devon, England
- Children: 13, including George

Cornelius Cardew (13 February 1748 – 18 September 1831) was a Cornish clergyman, educator, and politician. He served as the mayor of Truro from 1796-98.

== Biography ==
Cornelius Cardew was born in Liskeard, Cornwall, to John and Mary Cardew on 13 February 1748. He was baptized two months later.

Cardew studied at Exeter College in the University of Oxford, where he acquired his BA and later DD in 1770. Upon his graduation, he was elected to serve as the master of Truro Grammar School, a position he would hold for 34 years total. The future British chemist Humphry Davy was noted to have attended the school during Cardew's tenure, with Cardew remarking in a letter that he "could not discern the faculties by which he [Davy] was afterwards so much distinguished."

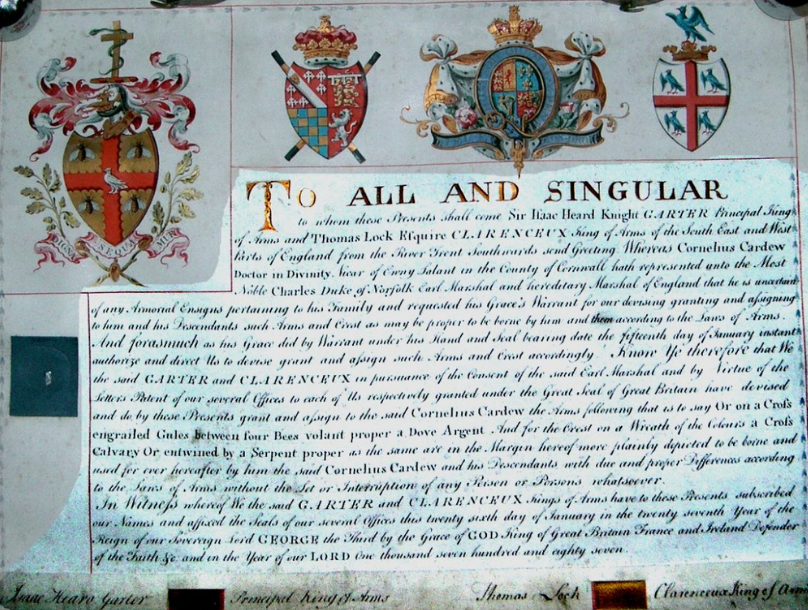
Cardew's 1787 patent of arms.

Cardew was issued a grant of arms in 1787 by George III via the English college of arms. The arms issued to him were described as "Or on a Cross engrailed Gules between four Bees volant proper a Dove Argent", with a crest of "a Cross Calvary Or entwined by a Serpent proper".

He became mayor of Truro in 1796. He was generally unpopular throughout his tenure, a fact that led to decreased attendance of his school. He served until 1798, and continued as schoolmaster until 1804. In 1803, he was commissioned as a chaplain by the Royal Stannary Volunteer Artillery.

He was appointed a justice of the peace in Cornwall on 10 April 1813.

Cardew served as curate and rector for the parish of St. Erme for 60 years altogether, from 1771 until his death in 1831. His portrait remains in the church. His son, George Cardew, would become acting governor of Malta from 1835-36.
