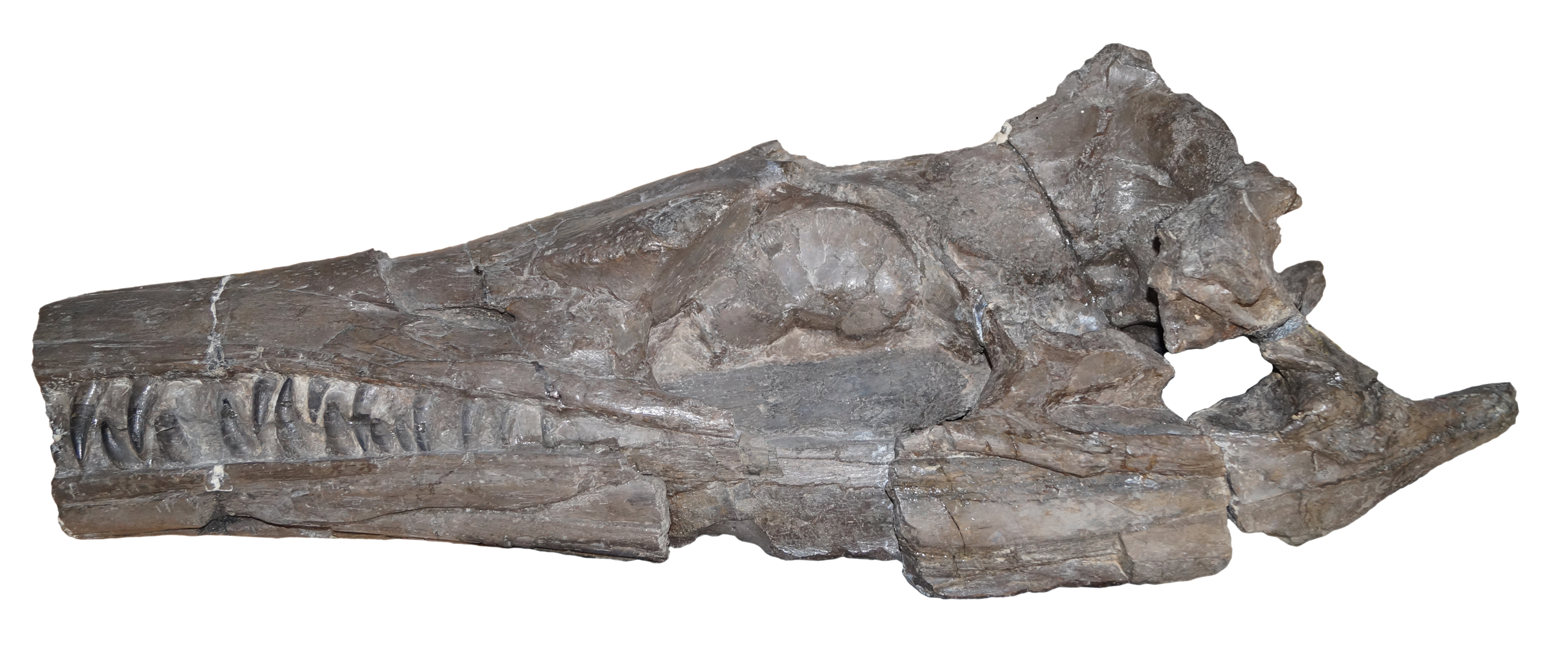
- Skull of Enalioetes schroederi

Scientific classification
- Kingdom: Animalia
- Phylum: Chordata
- Class: Reptilia
- Clade: Archosauria
- Clade: Pseudosuchia
- Clade: Crocodylomorpha
- Suborder: †Thalattosuchia
- Family: †Metriorhynchidae
- Subfamily: †Metriorhynchinae
- Genus: †Enalioetes; Sachs et al., 2024

Type species
- †Enalioetes schroederi Sachs et al., 2024

Synonyms
- Cricosaurus "schroederi" (Kuhn, 1936); Enaliosuchus "schroederi" Kuhn, 1936

= Enalioetes =

Enalioetes Temporal range: Early Cretaceous Valanginian

Fossil genus of reptile

Enalioetes is an extinct genus of metriorhynchid thalattosuchian from the Early Cretaceous Stadthagen Formation of Germany. The type species is E. schroederi.

Prior to its description in 2024, it was known under the informal names Enaliosuchus "schroederi" and Cricosaurus "schroederi".

== Discovery and naming ==
The holotype, which consists of much of the skull as well as parts of the neck, was discovered no later than 1916 in the Stadthagen Formation in Engelbostel, Germany. At the time of its discovery, the fossil material was thought to have belonged to a type of ichthyosaur by its discoverer, a government architect by the name of D. Hapke. Hapke then turned the fossils over to Prussian paleontologist Henry Schroeder in 1916, who proceeded to prepare and describe the material. Some years prior, in 1883, Ernst Koken described another metriorhynchid from the Stadthagen Formation, which he named Enaliosuchus macrospondylus. Noting some similarities in the anatomy of the first two neck vertebrae, Schroeder placed the so-called "Sachsenhagen specimen" in the genus Enaliosuchus, but notably did not explicitly regard it as being the same species as S. macrospondylus nor declared it a distinct species instead. In his work Schroeder also briefly contemplated the possibility that Enaliosuchus was synonymous with the French metriorhynchid Neustosaurus, although he ultimately forewent any definitive conclusions due to the lack of overlapping fossil material.

Schroeder eventually returned the fossils to Mr. Hapke, though little is known on the whereabouts of the material during this period. Oskar Kuhn for instance erroneously claimed that the material was housed in the capital of Berlin in his 1936 paper on the animal, when it had in fact been donated to the Mindener Museum in North Rhine-Westphalia. Regardless, Kuhn too contemplated the potential synonymity of Enaliosuchus and Neustosaurus, but did not yet lump the two genera. He did however recognize the "Sachsenhagen specimen" as a distinct form, giving it the name "Enaliosuchus schröderi". Kuhn did however not provide a proper diagnosis, instead simply referring readers to Schroeder's 1923 paper, which only found minor differences that at the time were chalked up to changes that occurred during ontogeny. This actually represented a violation of the International Code of Zoological Nomenclature (ICZN), which states that taxa published after 1930 either require a direct, textual description of the diagnostic features or at least a bibliographic reference to such, rendering it a nomen nudum. Furthermore, Kuhn's name was a hypercorrection, using an Umlaut despite the fact that Schroeder's name is spelled with an "oe" rather than an "ö". Even if it wasn't, the use of diacritic marks is not considered acceptable by the ICZN, meaning that subsequent publications correctly spelled the name as "E. schroederi".

While some authors continued to use the name E. schroederi, some later research questioned whether or not the animal was distinct to begin with. First among those was a 1961 publication by Sickenberg, which cast doubt over the validity of "E. schroederi" due to Schroeder's own uncertainty regarding the "Sachsenhagen specimen"s affinities. In 2000 Hua and colleagues formally synonymized E. macrospondylus with "E. schroederi" and in 2006 Karl and colleagues sunk all Enaliosuchus material into Metriorhynchus as indeterminate species. Contrary to this, Young and Andrade placed "E. schroederi" in the genus Cricosaurus as C. schroederi.

Eventually, first hand examination of the fossil material by Sachs et al. showed that both E. macrospondylus and "E. schroederi" were distinct species, separated primarily by the anatomy of the earliest neck vertebrae. The team further argued for a closer relationship between E. macrospondylus and Neustosaurus gigondarum, with the two animals possibly being congeneric, even though both taxa are for now considered nomina dubia. "E. schroederi" was redescribed in 2024 by Sachs and colleagues, for the first time giving it an actual diagnosis and erecting the new genus Enalioetes.

The genus name derives from the Greek "enalios" meaning "from the sea" and the suffix "-etes" to mean "dweller", a reference to the marine habits of metriorhynchids. The species name "schroederi" honours the initial work conducted on the animal by Henry Schroeder and is carried over from Kuhn's nomina nuda "Enaliosuchus schroederi". Sachs and colleagues argue that this avoids confusion in future studies, as the species name has a long history of use in scientific literature.

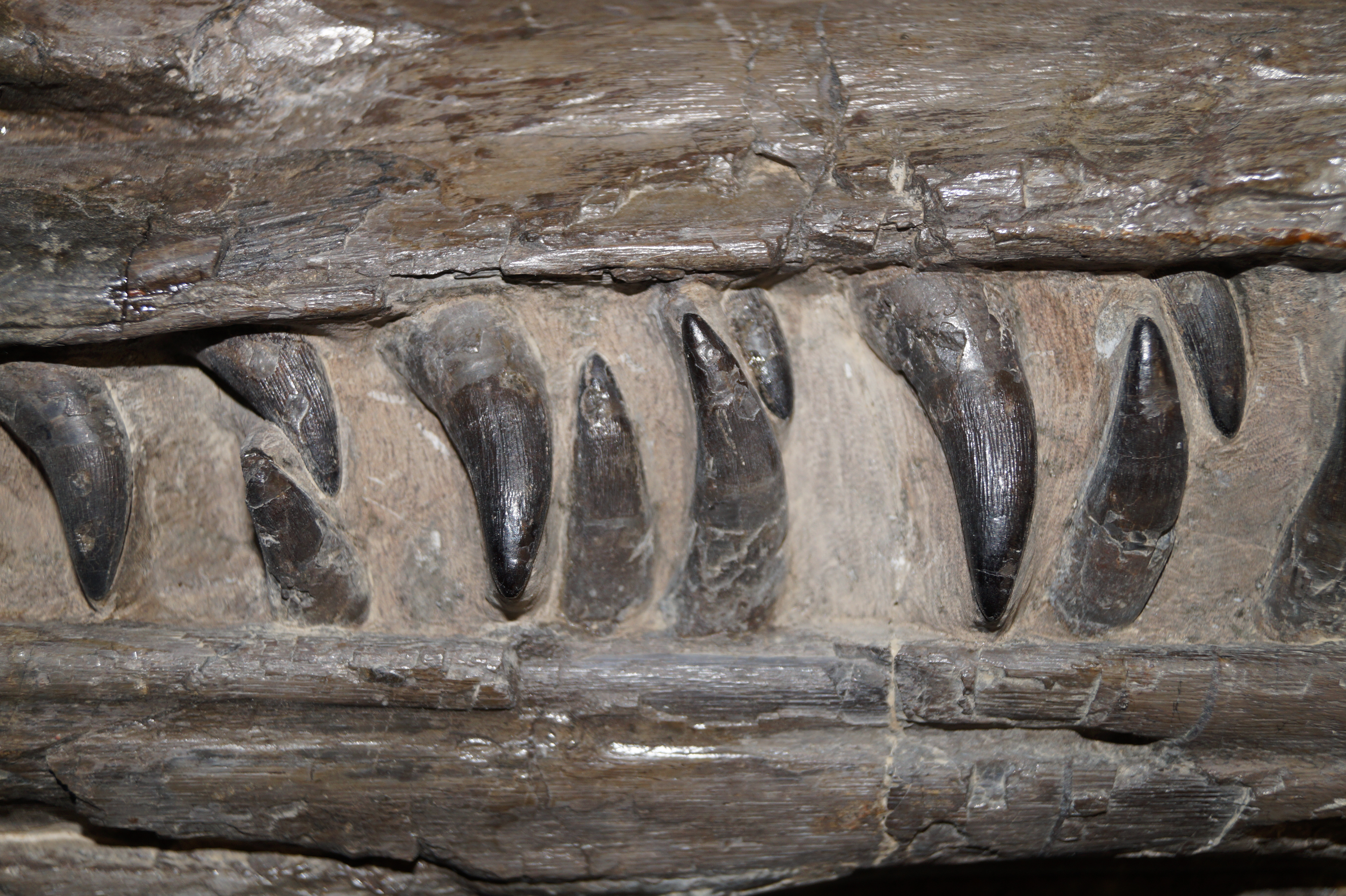
Close-up of the dentition of Enalioetes schroederi

== Description ==
The genus is among the most recent metriorhynchids known and one of the best preserved Cretaceous members of its group, preserving much of the skull as well as parts of the neck.

== Phylogeny ==
Multiple phylogenetic analysis were run under different conditions, both using equal and implied weighting of the characters. Several of the analysis were run with the constraint of forcing Enalioetes into one of several groups (specifically the genus Cricosaurus, a clade of unnamed rhacheosaurins and the group formed by Enaliosuchus & Neustosaurus), which were in turn compared to the results yielded by conducting the same analysis without such constraints. The results of this method, known as the templeton test, show that it would take three additional steps relative to the unconstrained result to force Enalioetes into Cricosaurus, four to force it into the unnamed rhacheosaurin clade and only one for it to clade with Enaliosuchus and Neustosaurus.

The results of the unconstrained analysis are shown in the tree below, which recovers Enalioetes deep within Metriorhynchidae. The tree recovers the family split into two major groups, Geosaurinae and Metriorhynchinae, with Enalioetes siting in a relatively basal position in the latter. It was recovered as more derived than Enaliosuchus and Neustosaurus but more basal than any rhacheosaurin group or Cricosaurus, the three clades it might also belong to. Sachs and colleagues note that the alternate placements could however not be excluded either.

- - - Enaliosuchus
    - Neustosaurus
  - - Thalattosuchus
    - - Gracilineustes
      - - Enalioetes
        - - Maledictosuchus
          - - Metriorhynchus brevirostris
            - Metriorhynchus cf. brevirostris
            - MNHNH P3009 Cuba
            - USNM 419640 Cuba
            - - - Metriorhynchus palpebrosus
                - - Cricosaurus saltillensis
                  - - Swiss rhacheosaurin
                    - Cretaceous rhacheosaurin
              - - Rhacheosaurus gralicis
                - - Dakosaurus lissocephalus
                  - Cricosaurus

There are multiple reasons for the ambiguity surrounding the placement of Enalioetes among metriorhynchids. For instance, few members of the clade are known from 3 dimensionally preserved skulls, making it uncertain how some internal skull characters were distributed (though they generally appear absent in Jurassic taxa). The lack of overlapping material with the other Cretaceous form is another hindrance, as is the lack of a cranial rostrum which was used as a key region for diagnostic features in the work of Young et al. (2024). Overall this limited comparative material means that the phylogenetic position of the animal is far from settled.
