= Stadthagen Formation =

Early Cretaceous geologic formation in Germany

- Stratigraphic range: Valanginian, ~132 Ma
- Type: Geological formation
- Unit of: Lower Saxony Basin
- Sub-units: Platylenticeras involutum ammonite zone; Platylenticeras heteropleurum ammonite zone; Platylenticeras robustum ammonite zone
- Overlies: Bückeberg Formation and Isterberg Formation

Location
- Coordinates: 52.3972°N 9.2683°E
- Region: Hanover, Germany
- Country: Germany
- Extent: Engelbostel and Sachsenhagen clay pits

The Stadthagen Formation is a geological formation located in Hanover, Germany, dating to the Early Cretaceous (Valanginian). The formation contains fossils of reptiles and fish, suggesting that the formation was once a shallow marine setting.

== History ==
The Stadthagen Formation outcrops in the Engelbostel and Sachsenhagen clay pits, which operated as brickworks from 1904 to 1986. After the brickworks closed in 1986, most of the quarry area was backfilled and used as a waste dump before being abandoned.

== Paleobiota of the Stadthagen Formation ==
Genus	Species	Location	Stratigraphic position	Material	Notes	Image
Actinopterygii	Indeterminate	Sachsenhagen				
Crocodylomorpha	Indeterminate	Sachsenhagen			Known from remains currently located within private collections.	
Enalioetes	E. schroederi	Engelbostel		Much of the skull as well as parts of the neck.	Previously known as Enaliosuchus "schroederi" and Cricosaurus "schroederi".	
Enaliosuchus	E. macrospondylus			An atlas-axis complex, three post-axial cervical vertebrae, several dorsal vertebrae, a caudal vertebra, an incomplete femur and a fragmentary sacral rib.	Its remains have also been recovered from the Campylotoxus Zone of France.	
Gyrodus	G. sp.	Engelbostel		Nearly complete specimen.		
Plesiosauria	Indeterminate	Sachsenhagen				
Targaryendraco	T. wiedenrothi	Engelbostel and Sachsenhagen	Platylenticeras robustum and P. heteropleurum ammonite zones	Partial skeleton with lower jaws.	Previously known as Ornithocheirus wiedenrothi.	
