= Joe Kendrick =

Joe Kendrick may refer to:

- Joseph Kendrick (sculptor) (1755–?), British sculptor
- Joe Kendrick (footballer, born 1905) (1905–1965), Irish footballer who played during the 1920s and 1930s
- Joe Kendrick (footballer, born 1983), Irish footballer and great nephew of above
