= Augustus Frederic Christopher Kollmann =

Composer and music theorist (1756–1829)

- Born: 21 March 1756; Engelbostel, Hanover
- Died: 19 April 1829 (aged 73); London
- Occupation: Composer

Augustus Frederic Christopher Kollmann (21 March 1756 – 19 April 1829) was a German-born composer and musical theorist who lived and worked in England from 1782 until his death. He has been called "The First Apostle of Bach in England".

== Life ==
Augustus Frederic Christopher Kollmann was born in Engelbostel, near Hanover on 21 March 1756. His father was an organist and schoolmaster. His brother George Christoph became a well-known organist at Hamburg. He studied for two years in the second class of the Hannover Lyceum between about 1770 and 1772. In 1772 he moved up to the first class of the Lyceum. He was taught by Johann Christian Böttner (1731–1800), from Thuringia, who inspired him with a love of Bach. In 1779 he was admitted to an academy for schoolmasters, where he learned a systematic method of teaching that he applied afterwards when acting as a musical tutor. In 1781 he was appointed organist and schoolmaster at the Protestant convent, or school for noble ladies, at Lüne.

In 1782 Kollmann moved to England. On 17 September 1782 he began work at the Royal German Chapel in London. He was given the position of chapel-keeper of the German Chapel on 9 April 1784, and was to remain in this position for the rest of his life. King George III presented a chamber organ to the chapel in 1792, and Kollmann played this instrument as "clerk" of the chapel until his death. When there was a fire in the palace in 1809, he is said to have physically prevented the firemen from entering the chapel to destroy it. Kollmann seems to have been a founding member of the New Musical Fund, established on 16 April 1786. He served as a member of the fund for the remainder of his life.

Kollmann died in London on 19 April 1829. He was succeeded by his son George Augustus Kollmann and his daughter Johanna Sophia Kollmann who died in 1849.

His obituary in the Literary Gazette said: "No one could be more esteemed by all who knew him, through the course of a long life, than was this distinguished author. His memory, however, will live in his works, which may be designated as the Encyclopedia of Musical Science."

== Work ==
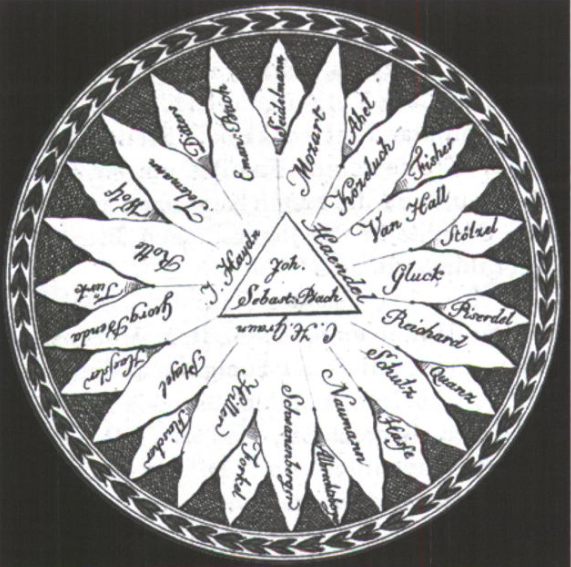
A.F.C. Kollmann's diagram of Bach as the sun, included by Johann Nikolaus Forkel in the Allgemeine Musikalische Zeitung in October 1799

In 1799 the leading musical periodical of the day published a diagram created by Kollmann in the form of a "sun of composers". Johann Sebastian Bach was at the center, the man from whom all true musical wisdom proceeded, surrounded by George Frideric Handel, Carl Heinrich Graun and Joseph Haydn, and they in turn were surrounded by other composers. Kollman composed a piano concerto, chamber music and songs. He published "The shipwreck, or the Loss of the East Indiaman Halsewell", an orchestral symphony, commemorating the 1786 loss of the Halsewell in which about 170 people drowned.

Kollmann published treatises on musical theory that build on those of Johann Kirnberger, and take the music of J.S Bach as the basis. These include An Essay on Musical Harmony (1796) and An Essay on Practical Musical Composition (1799). In An Essay on Musical Harmony he said that, when playing alone, "the organ and other keyed instruments should be unequally tempered, though not so much as some tuners do, as to produce chords which are really offensive." In An Essay on Practical Musical Composition he argued that a concert could represent a confrontation between the parts, as in C.P.E. Bach's "A Conversation between a Cheerful Man and a Melancholy Man." He was the first to completely disregard the alternation between tutti and solo as the basis for a concerto's organisation, replacing it with a harmonic formula.

A friendly reviewer of his A Practical Guide to Thorough Bass (1801) began, "This work, the utility of which will be obvious to every musical reader, is conducted in that methodical and systematic plan for which all Mr. Kollmann's didactic publications are distinguished." Kollmann wrote and compiled an edition of the Quarterly Musical Register that was published on 1 January 1812. Some sources say he may have been the translator of the work published in London in 1820 as On Johann Sebastian Bach's Life, Genius and Works, from the 1802 work in German of Johann Nicolaus Forkel. This is incorrect.

== Family ==
Kollmann married in 1783. He and his wife Christina had two children. Joanna Sophie was born on 20 July 1786 and George Augustus was born on 30 January 1789, when his mother was 43 years old. Joanna first sang in public on 13 March 1806, performing a "scena" by Mozart at a New Musical Fund concert. Her last recorded performance was on 24 June 1811 at a performance to raise money for Portuguese who had suffered from the Peninsular War.

Kollmann's son George succeeded him in 1829 as "Organist, Clerk and Chapel Keeper of His Majesty's German Lutheran Chapel St James's'." That year the Royal Academy exhibited a bust of Kollmann by Joseph Kendrick, whose family was musical and had been friendly with the Kollmanns. In 1834 the Royal Academy exhibited a painting of Joanna Kollmann by Kendrick's daughter Emma. George died from kidney disease on 19 March 1845. Joanna succeeded him as chapel-keeper. She died in May 1849.

== Bibliography ==
- Kollmann, Augustus Frederic Christopher (1792). An Introduction to the art of Preluding and Extemporizing in Six Lessons for the Harpsichord or Harp, Opus 3. London: R.Wornum.
- Kollmann, Augustus Frederic Christopher (1796). An Essay on Musical Harmony, According to the Nature of that Science and the Principles of the Greatest Musical Authors. Elibron.com. ISBN 978-1-4021-8489-5.
- Kollmann, Augustus Frederic Christopher (1799). An Essay on Practical Musical Composition, According to the Nature of that Science and the Principles of the Greatest Musical Authors. By Augustus Frederic Christopher Kollmann, Organist of His Majesty's German Chapel at St. James. author, (Friary, St. James's palace), and to be had of him; at Mr. Dale's, No. 19, Cornhill, and No. 132, Oxford Street;-at Messrs. Longman, Clementi, and Company No. 26, Cheapside;-at Mr. Smart's, the corner of Argyll Street, Oxford Street; and at the other principal music shops; also at Mr. Low's, No. 7, Berwick Street, Soho.
- Kollmann, Augustus Frederic Christopher (1801). A Practical Guide to Thorough-bass. The author.
- Kollmann, Augustus Frederic Christopher; King, Matthew Peter (1801). A.F.C. Kollmann's Vindication of a Passage in His Practical Guide to Thorough-bass, Against an Advertisement of Mr. M.P. King. author.
- Kollmann, Augustus Frederic Christopher (1806). A New Theory of Musical Harmony, According to a Complete and Natural System of that Science. W.Bulmer.
- Kollmann, Augustus Frederic Christopher (1807). A Second Practical Guide to Thorough Bass. author.
- Kollmann, Augustus Frederic Christopher (1822). Twelve Analysed Fugues, with Double Counterpoints in All Intervals, and Introductory Explanations. Composed for Two Performers on One Piano Forte ... Opera X. author.

== Sources ==
- Grove, George (1880). A Dictionary of Music and Musicians (a.d. 1450–1889) by eminent writers, English and foreign: With illustrations and woodcuts . Macmillan.
- Gorton, John (1833). A general biographical dictionary. H.G. Bohn.
- Kassler, Michael (2004). The English Bach Awakening: Knowledge Of J.S. Bach And His Music In England 1750–1830. Ashgate Publishing, Ltd. ISBN 978-1-84014-666-0.
- Kassler, Michael (15 December 2008). A.F.C. Kollmann's Quarterly Musical Register (1812): An Annotated Edition With an Introduction to His Life and Works. Ashgate Publishing, Ltd. ISBN 978-0-7546-6064-4.
- Keefe, Simon P. (27 October 2005). The Cambridge Companion to the Concerto. Cambridge Companions to Music. Cambridge University Press. ISBN 978-0-521-83483-4.
- Lester, Joel (1999). Bach's Works for Solo Violin: Style, Structure, Performance. Oxford University Press. ISBN 978-0-19-512097-4.
- Lindeman, Stephan D. (1999). Structural Novelty and Tradition in the Early Romantic Piano Concerto. Pendragon Press. p. 8. ISBN 978-1-57647-000-8.
- Palmieri, Robert; Palmieri, Margaret W. (2003). Piano: An Encyclopedia. Taylor & Francis. ISBN 978-0-415-93796-2.
- Phillips, Sir Richard (1801). "Review of the New Musical Publications". The Monthly Magazine. Sherwood, Gilbert and Piper.
- Randel, Don Michael (1999). The Harvard Concise Dictionary of Music and Musicians. Harvard University Press. ISBN 978-0-674-00084-1.
- Reeve, Lovell Augustus; Jephson, John Mounteney; Brooks, Shirley; Henry Christmas, George Augustus Frederick Fitzclarence (1st Earl of Munster) (1829). "Mr. Kollmann". The Literary Gazette: A Weekly Journal of Literature, Science, and the Fine Arts. H. Colburn.
- Shedlock, J.S. (1883). "Das Wohltemperirte Clavier". The Musical Times. Novello.
- Wolff, Christoph (17 September 2001). Johann Sebastian Bach: The Learned Musician. W. W. Norton & Company. p. 9. ISBN 978-0-393-07595-3.
