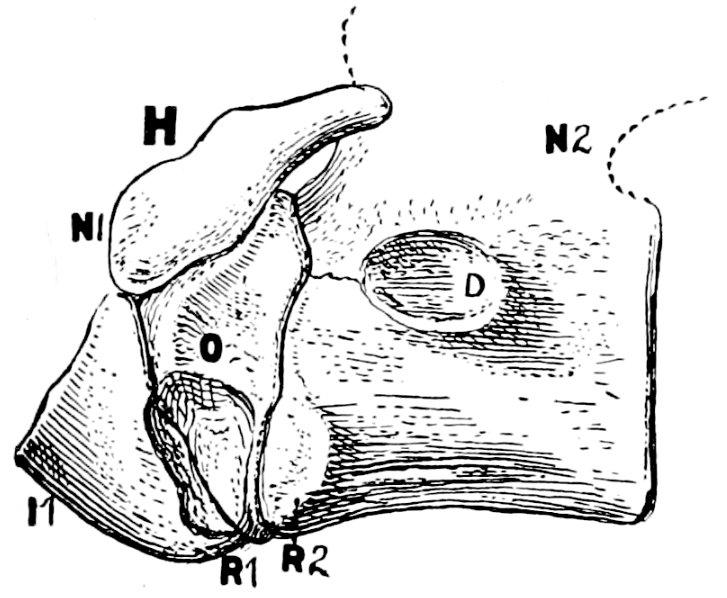
- Vertebra from the holotype of E. macrospondylus

Scientific classification
- Kingdom: Animalia
- Phylum: Chordata
- Class: Reptilia
- Clade: Archosauria
- Clade: Pseudosuchia
- Clade: Crocodylomorpha
- Suborder: †Thalattosuchia
- Family: †Metriorhynchidae
- Genus: †Enaliosuchus; Koken, 1883

Type species
- †Enaliosuchus macrospondylus Koken, 1883

Synonyms
- Cricosaurus macrospondylus? (Kuhn, 1883)

= Enaliosuchus =

Enaliosuchus Temporal range: Early Cretaceous, ~140–132 Ma

Dubious extinct genus of sauropsids

Enaliosuchus is a dubious genus of extinct marine crocodyliform within the family Metriorhynchidae that lived during the Valanginian stage of the Early Cretaceous. It is known from fossil remains found in France and Germany and it was first described in 1883.

Only the type species is known, which is Enaliosuchus macrospondylus.

== Etymology ==
The name Enaliosuchus means "Marine crocodile", and is derived from the Greek Enalios- ("marine") and -suchos ("crocodile").

== Discovery and naming ==
The holotype, specimen MB.R.1943.1–16, consists of an atlas-axis complex, three post-axial cervical vertebrae, several dorsal vertebrae, a caudal vertebra, an incomplete femur and a fragmentary sacral rib, and it was discovered in the Stadthagen Formation in Germany. The species Enaliosuchus macrospondylus was then named for this specimen by Koken (1883).

Isolated teeth were subsequently found across Germany and have been assigned to Enaliosuchus, and a partial specimen (specimen RNGD 990201) discovered in the Campylotoxus Zone of France was assigned to Enaliosuchus macrospondylus by Hua et al. (2000).

== Description ==
Enaliosuchus was a carnivore that spent much, if not all, its life out at sea. No Enaliosuchus eggs or nest have been discovered, so little is known of the reptile's lifecycle, unlike other large marine reptiles of the Mesozoic, such as plesiosaurs or ichthyosaurs which are known to give birth to live young out at sea. Where Enaliosuchus mated, whether on land or at sea, is currently unknown.

== Species ==
The species within Enaliosuchus include :

- E. macrospondylus: type species from France and Germany of the Early Cretaceous (Valanginian).

Recent phylogenetic analyses found the genus Enaliosuchus to be monophyletic, but also to be nested within the genus Geosaurus or Cricosaurus. Sachs et al. (2020) hypothesised that the two species within the genus Enaliosuchus were not monophyletic. They hypothesised that E. schroederi belonged to a new, undescribed, genus.

In 2024, Enaliosuchus schroederi, from Germany, which was previously believed to likely be a junior synonym of E. macrospondylus, was moved to the new genus Enalioetes in 2024.
