= Emma Eleonora Kendrick =

British painter

- Born: c. 1788
- Died: 1871; London, England
- Occupation: Painter
- Known for: Miniatures

Emma Eleonora Kendrick (c. 1788–1871) was a British miniature-painter who was prominent during the reigns of Kings George IV and William IV.

== Life ==
Emma Eleonora Kendrick was born around 1788, daughter of the sculptor Joseph Kendrick. Emma's elder sister Josephia Jane Mary Kendrick was an accomplished harpist who performed in public, and later gave harp lessons. Both Emma and Josephia became life members of the New Musical Fund in 1822.

Between 1810 and 1817 Emma won several prizes from the Society of Arts. In 1831 she was appointed miniature painter to Princess Elisabeth of Hesse-Homburg and to William IV. She painted miniature portraits of royalty and eminent people. She was a member of the New Water-Colour Society and the Society of British Artists. Between 1811 and 1840 her work was exhibited by the Royal Academy of Arts.

She did not exhibit after 1840. In her later years she taught miniature painting to the daughters of the nobility. Emma Eleanor Kendrick died on 6 April 1871, aged 83.

== Work ==
Apart from portraits, Kendrick also painted watercolors of classical, mythological and literary subjects. In 1830 she published a handbook titled Conversations on the Art of Miniature Painting.

== Gallery ==
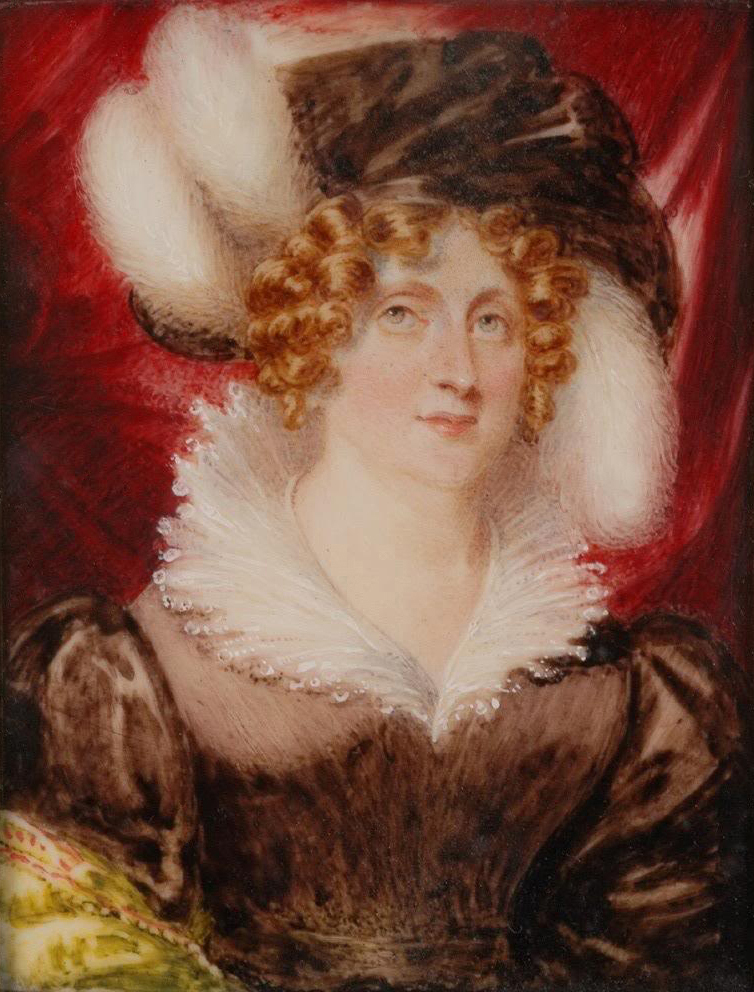
Court Lady (1829)

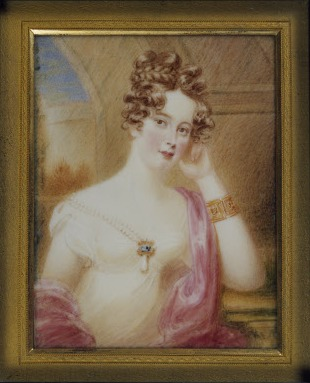
Mary (Bloxsome), Mrs. Robert Bruce Chichester

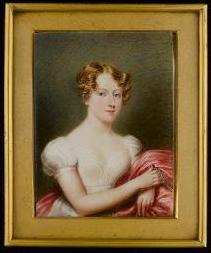
A Lady Wearing a White Dress

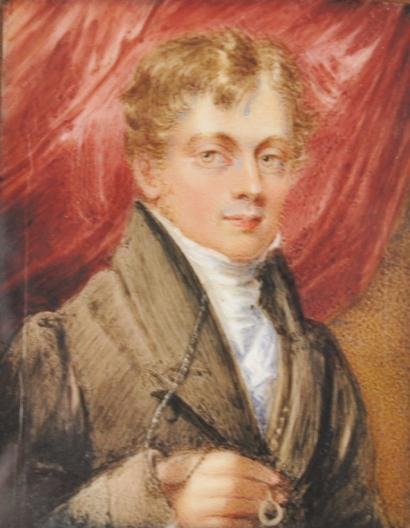
Portrait of a blond man

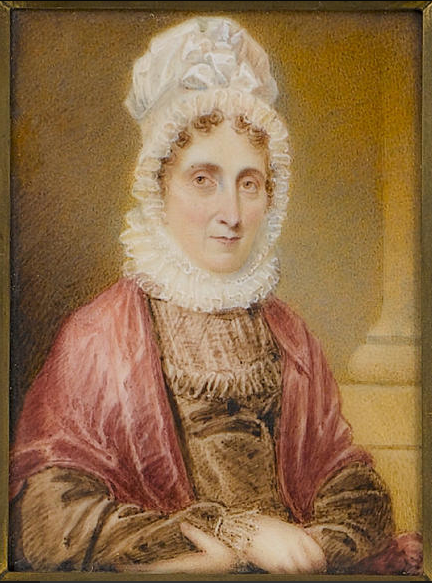
Lady in a brown dress

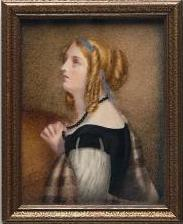
A young lady praying

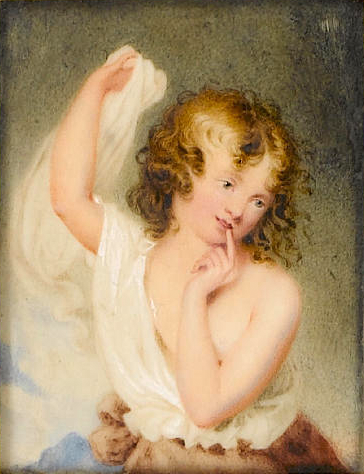
Portrait of a young girl

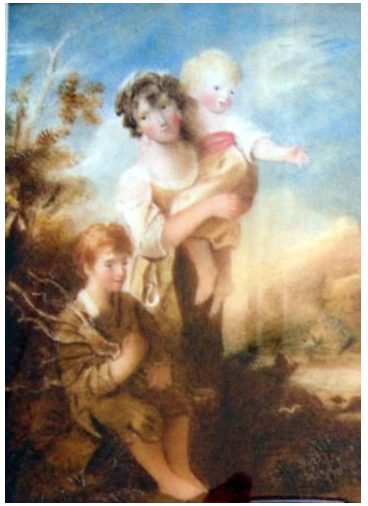
The Wood Gatherers after Gainsborough (1836)

== Sources ==
- Cust, Lionel Henry (1892). "Kendrick, Emma Eleonora". Dictionary of National Biography, 1885-1900. Vol. 30.
- "Emma Eleonora Kendrick (1788 - 1871), court artist by British King George IV". Alte Kunst Fine Art Gallery.
- Kassler, Michael (15 December 2008). A.F.C. Kollmann's Quarterly Musical Register (1812): An Annotated Edition With an Introduction to His Life and Works. Ashgate Publishing, Ltd. ISBN 978-0-7546-6064-4.
