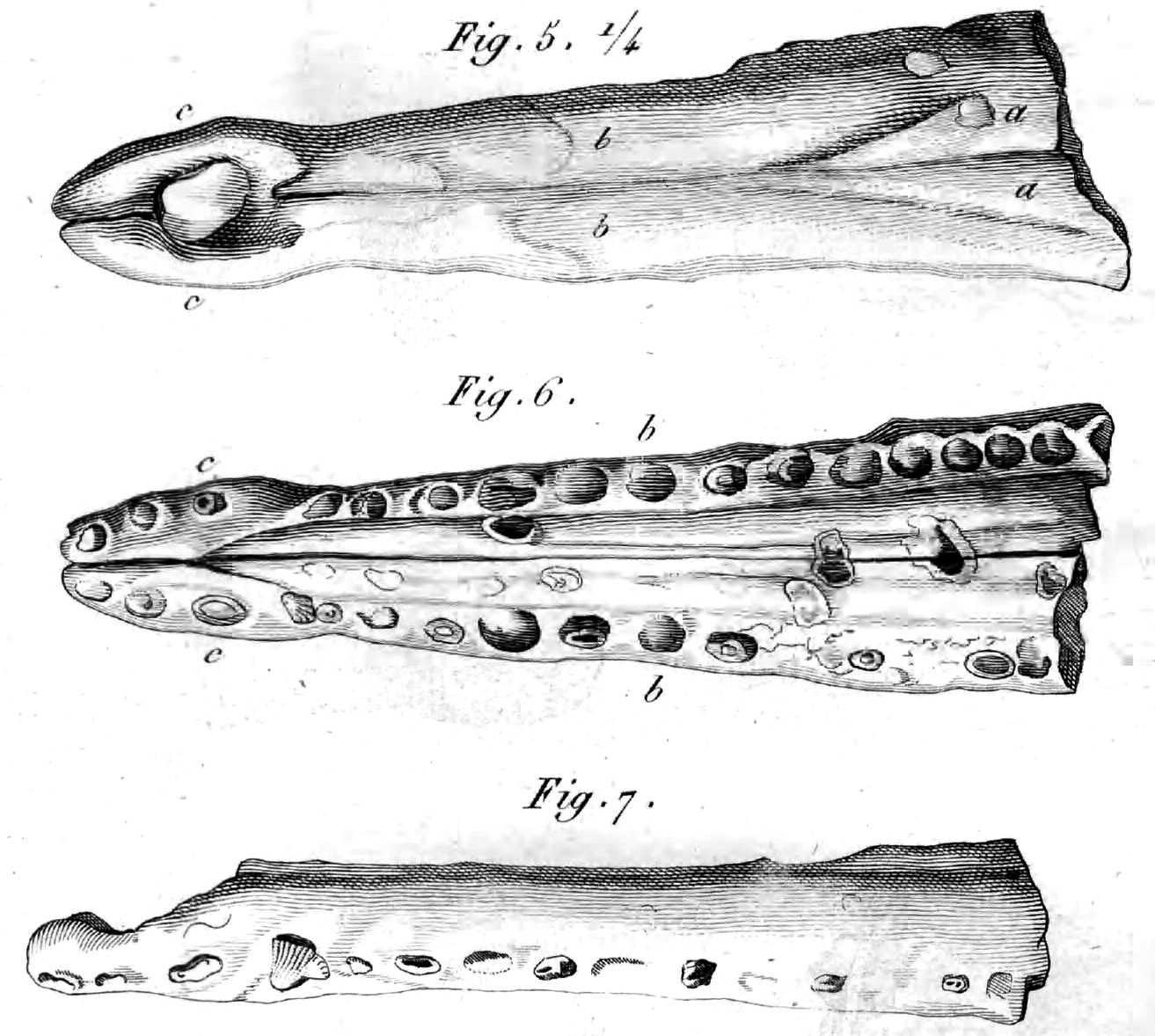
- Partial holotype rostrum (MHNG V-2232) of M. brevirostris as illustrated in 1824

Scientific classification
- Kingdom: Animalia
- Phylum: Chordata
- Class: Reptilia
- Clade: Pseudosuchia
- Clade: Crocodylomorpha
- Suborder: †Thalattosuchia
- Family: †Metriorhynchidae
- Genus: †Metriorhynchus von Meyer, 1832
- Species: †M. brevirostris

Binomial name
- †Metriorhynchus brevirostris (Holl, 1828) vide Young et al., 2020

Synonyms
- Gavialis jurinii Gray, 1831; Metriorhynchus geoffroyii von Meyer, 1832; Streptospondylus geoffroyi (von Meyer, 1832); Steneosaurus brevirostris Holl, 1829; Steneosaurus rostro-minor Geoffroy, 1825

= Metriorhynchus =

Metriorhynchus Temporal range: Kimmeridgian, 157–150 Ma

Extinct genus of reptiles

Metriorhynchus is an extinct genus of marine crocodyliform that lived in the oceans during the Late Jurassic. The type species, M. brevirostris was named in 1829 as a species of Steneosaurus before being named as a separate genus by the German palaeontologist Christian von Meyer in 1832. The name Metriorhynchus means "moderate snout", and is derived from the Greek Metrio- ("moderate") and -rhynchos ("snout").

== Discovery and species ==
Fossil specimens referrable to Metriorhynchus are known from Kimmeridgian (Late Jurassic) deposits of France.

The earliest discovered specimen of Metriorhynchus brevirostris is MNHN.F.RJN 116, a jaw collected from the Marnes de Villers by Charles Bacheley during the early 1770s, who believed it belonged to a fish in 1778 and then a dolphin or a sperm whale in 1808, that was described by Cuvier (1808). The holotype of M. brevirostris is MHNG V02232, a partial rostrum from Le Havre, and Georges Cuvier mentioned that it was in the collection of the Museum of the Academy of Geneva in 1811. In 1824, Cuvier then described multiple "gavial" remains and came to the now-incorrect conclusion that he was describing two species (what would later become Metriorhynchus and Streptospondylus); Cuvier had also grouped into the remains the lectotype of Steneosaurus rostromajor.

When naming Steneosaurus in 1825, Étienne Geoffroy Saint-Hilaire created two species for the genus: Steneosaurus rostro-major (now S. rostromajor) and S. rostro-minor. He assigned MNHN.F.RJN 116 to S. rostro-major and Friedrich Holl created Steneosaurus brevirostris in 1829 to solely classify MHNG V02232. In 1831, John Edward Gray instead assigned the specimen to the gharial species Gavialis jurinii. The next year, Hermann von Meyer separated Cuvier's two "gharial" species and created Metriorhynchus brevirostris, Metriorhynchus geoffroyi (to house MHNG V02232) and Streptospondylus altdorfensis (now recognised as a theropod dinosaur). Amongst the splitting of the "gavial" species, von Meyer (1832) incorrectly placed MNHN.F.RJN 116 within S. altdorfensis.

François Jules Pictet suggested that Metriorhynchus was a synonym of Steneosaurus and in 1845 was the first author to invalidate S. rostro-minor as a species. Metriorhynchus as a genus was later reinstated, and Eugène Eudes-Deslongchamps (1867–69) recognized four Callovian species of Metriorhynchus: M. superciliosus, M. moreli, M. blainvillei, and M. brachyrhynchus, and he also standardised the use of the genus name Metriorhynchus.

Richard Lydekker in 1888a suggested it to be "advisable" to retain the name Metriorhynchus, and in 1889a he suggested that Metriorhynchus was similar to Cricosaurus and therefore he concluded the genus was crocodilian. Steel moved MHNG V02232 back into Metriorhynchus geoffroyii in 1973.

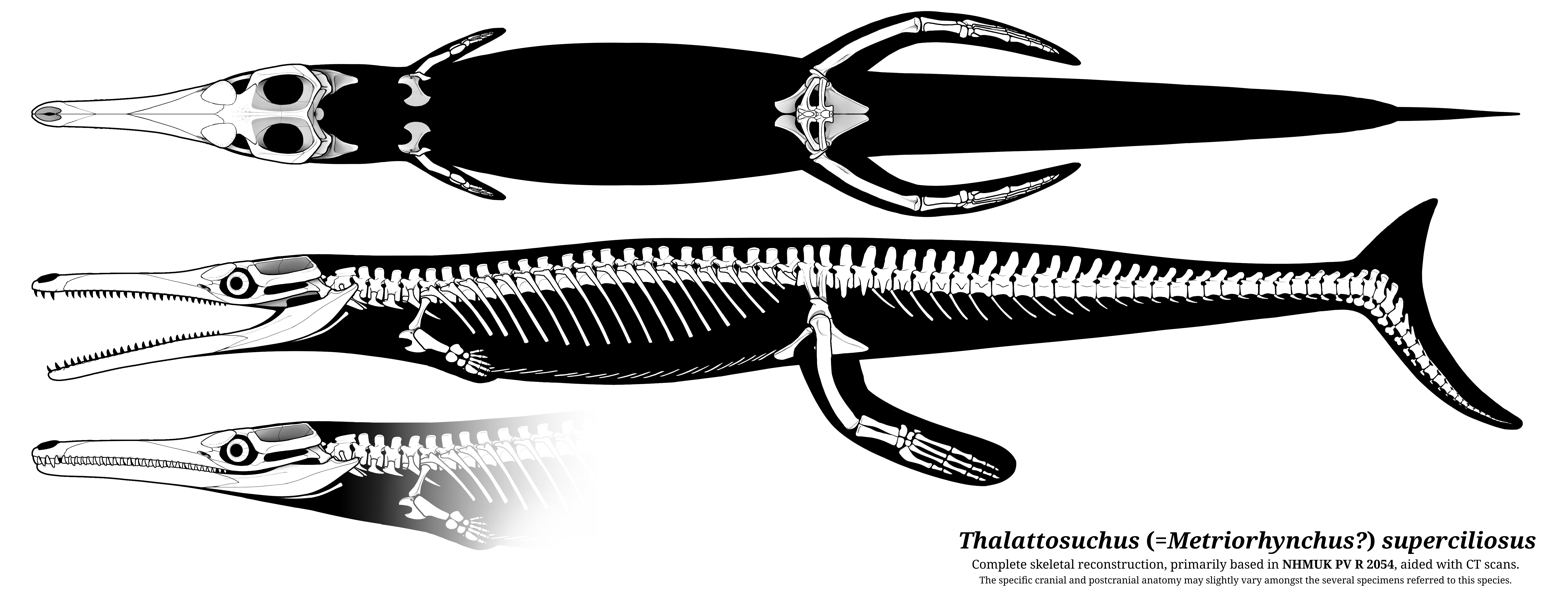
Skeletal reconstruction of Thalattosuchus superciliosus, previously considered a species of Metriorhynchus

Young et al. (2010) was the first to restrict M. brevirostris by re-assigning specimens to other genera, and MHNG V02232 was designated as the holotype of M. brevirostris by Young et al. (2019). Young et al. (2019) also synonymised M. geoffroyii with M. brevirostris and reassigned MNHN.F.RJN 116 to M. brevirostris.

=== Valid species ===
Only one valid species is recognized today, the type species M. geoffroyii (now called M. brevirostris). "Metriorhynchus" hastifer and "M." palpebrosus are generically distinct from the Metriorhynchus type species, with hastifer being recovered as a geosaurine. Species in this genus were traditionally classed into two skull groups: longirostrine (long, narrow jaws) and brevirostrine (short, broad jaws). However, most of brevirostrine species have been transferred to the genera Purranisaurus and Suchodus. Metriorhynchus superciliosus was also shown to be generically distinct from the type species, M. brevirostris, and now has its own genus Thalattosuchus.

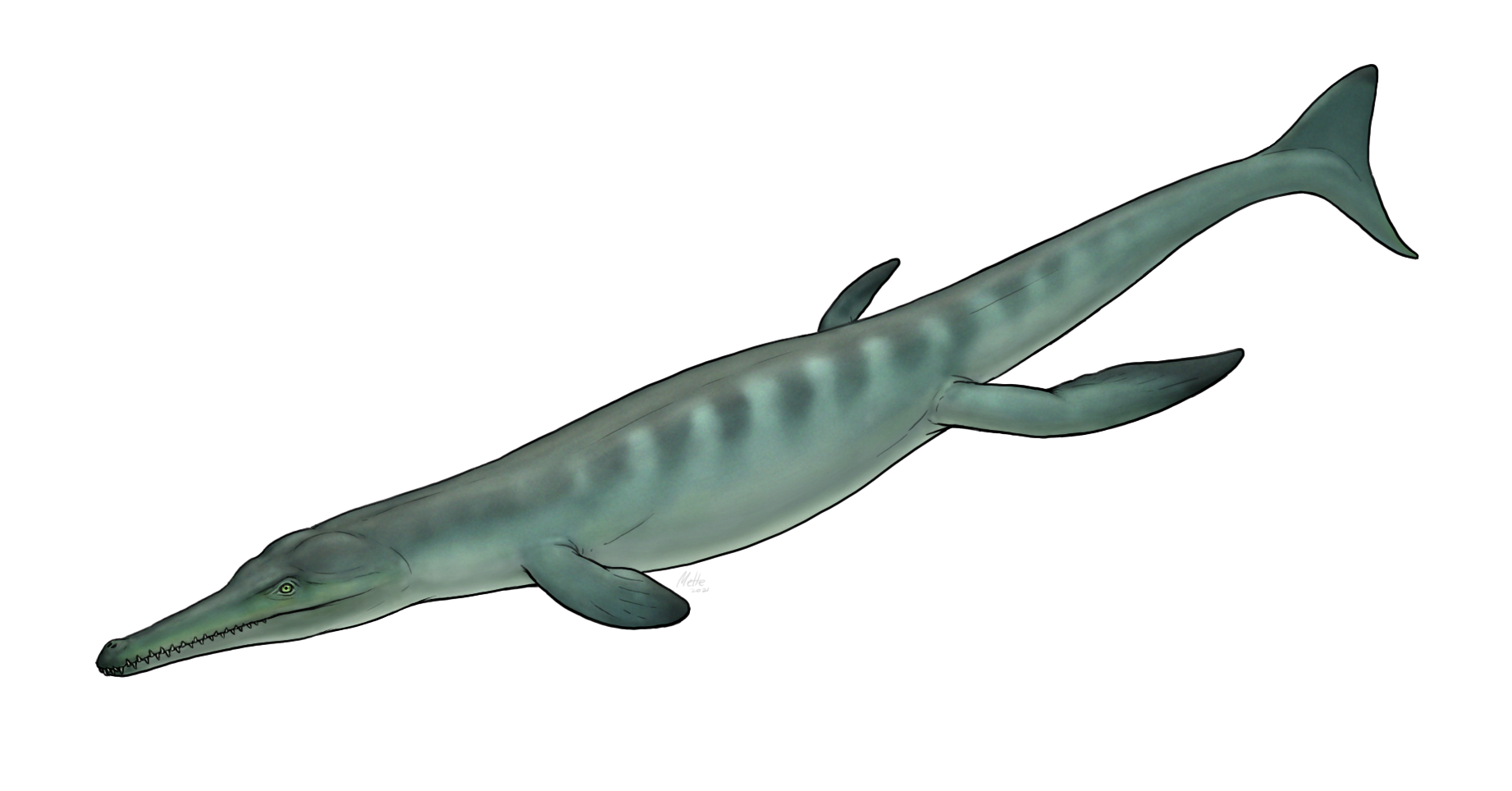
Life reconstruction of Metriorhynchus brevirostris

The genera Purranisaurus and Suchodus have been considered junior synonyms of Metriorhynchus. Recent phylogenetic analyses however, do not support the monophyly of Metriorhynchus, as believed during the 1860s-2010. Eudes-Deslongchamps (1867–69) recognized four Callovian species of Metriorhynchus: M. superciliosus, M. moreli, M. blainvillei, and M. brachyrhynchus. Later, Andrews (1913) considered there to be seven valid species: M. superciliosus, M. moreli, M. brachyrhynchus, M. durobrivensis, M. cultridens, M. leedsi and M. laeve. However, Adams-Tresman (1987), using linear morphometrics, could only distinguish between the two skull groups, so she found there to be two species from the Oxford Clay, M. superciliosus and M. brachyrhynchus. Vignaud (1997) however, considered there to be three Callovian species: M. superciliosus, M. brachyrhynchus and M. leedsi, and a 2022 study describing a new metriorhynchid specimen advocated returning to this taxonomic system, considering Gracilineustes and Thalattosuchus junior synonyms of Metriorhynchus.

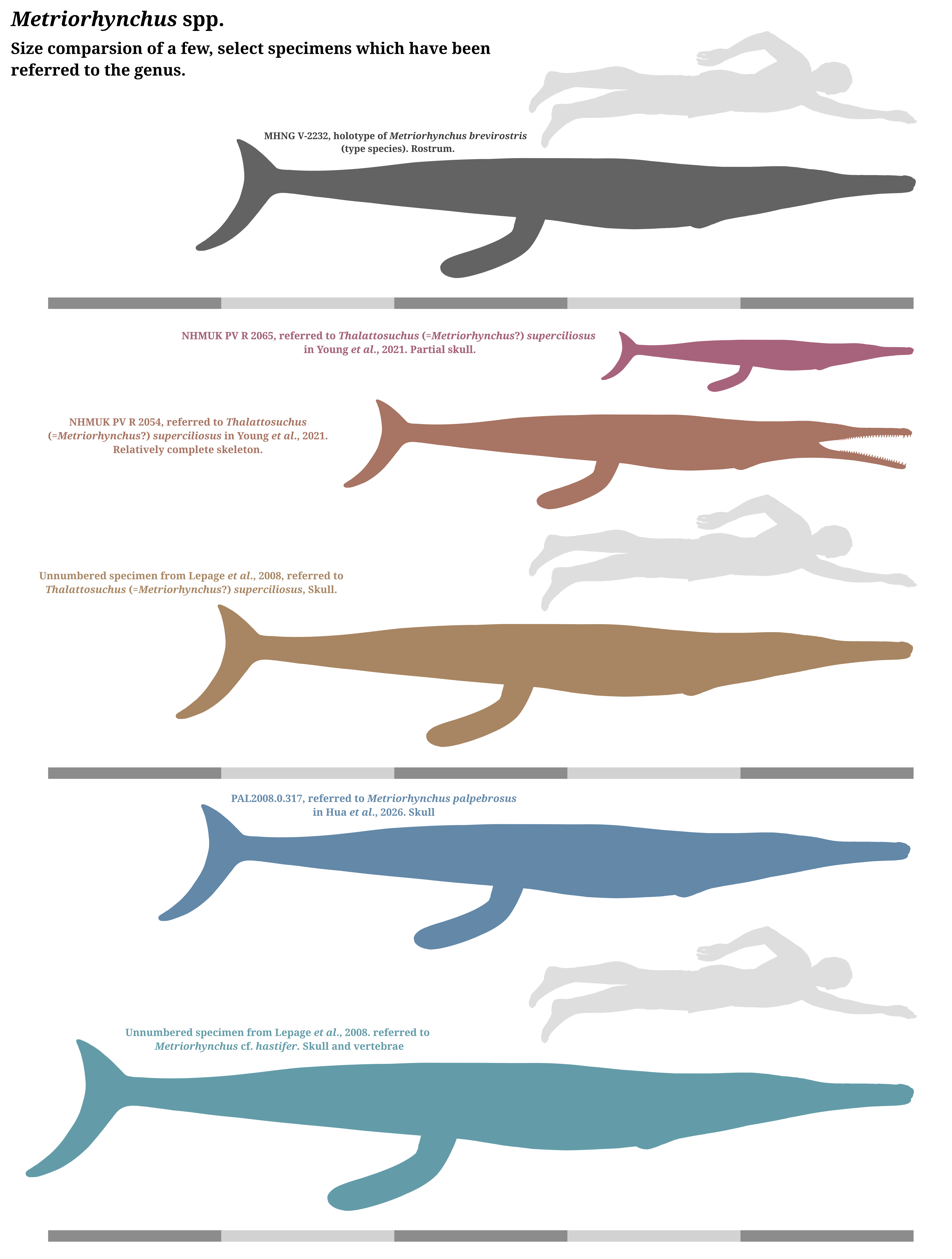
Size comparison of Metriorhynchus brevirostris (top), and other specimens which have been previously assigned to the genus

=== Unnamed species ===
Fragmentary remains attributed to Metriorhynchus are known from South America during the Bajocian and Bathonian (both Middle Jurassic). However, phylogenetic analysis has shown that these species cannot be referred to Metriorhynchus.

== Description ==
Metriorhynchus was a thalattosuchian, a group of marine crocodylomorphs. It was a member of the Metriorhynchidae, a group of thalattosuchians with a tail anatomy which indicates that they had a tail fluke similar to that of a shark. Unlike many other pseudosuchians, they did not have extensive osteoderms covering the body. Instead it appears that they had smoother skin similar to other marine reptiles like plesiosaurs and ichthyosaurs. Metriorhynchids also had a hip anatomy conducive for live birth and evidence from the related Dakosaurus does show that they did this. Metriorhynchus can be distinguished from other metriorhynchids in that the three front teeth get bigger from front to back, with the first being round and the third more oval-shaped. The jaws have a narrow point where different parts of the upper jaw meet, and there are at least 13 teeth before the palatine bones start. The teeth are mostly oval-shaped, but after the third one, they become rounder. The front part of the nasal bones stops near the eighth tooth, and unlike most animals, it has a single large external nostril instead of two separate ones. The opening for the nostrils begins behind the first tooth and ends just past the last one in the front section of the jaw. It was about 3 meters (9.8 feet) in body length.

== Paleoecology ==
Metriorhynchus was a carnivore. One fossil shows it has eaten the gill apparatus of the giant fish Leedsichthys. The idea of Metriorhynchus attacking weak Leedsichthys individuals has been speculated to be the case in the past such as in the BBC and Discovery Channel documentary Sea Monsters.

== See also ==
- List of marine reptiles
