= Joseph Kendrick (sculptor) =

British sculptor

- Born: 4 June 1755
- Occupation: Sculptor

Joseph Kendrick (born 4 June 1755) was a British sculptor.

== Life ==
Joseph Kendrick was born on 4 June 1755. In 1771 he attended the Royal Academy Schools, and then followed with a career as a sculptor. He was also active in music in London, and was described as an Alto in Doane's Musical Directory on 1794. Kendrick seems to have moved to Portsmouth after 1805. In December 1813 the Royal Academy of Arts granted Kendrick the gold medal and a prize of fifty guineas for the best historical basso relievo. In 1811 he made a monument to Colonel Sir William Myers, borrowing from the composition of Louis-François Roubiliac's tribute to Admiral Warren, but with the attendant female in a defiant rather than melancholy pose. In 1829 the Royal Academy exhibited a bust of the organist Augustus Frederic Christopher Kollmann by Kendrick.

Kendrick married a Miss Crow of Wateringbury. Kendrick's older daughter Josephia Jane Mary Kendrick was an accomplished harpist who performed in public and later gave lessons in the harp. His other children included Emma Kendrick (1788-1871), the miniaturist, and Josephus John Pinnix Kendrick, also a sculptor. Emma won several prizes from the Society of Arts, and exhibited at the Royal Academy and other locations between 1811 and 1840. In 1834 the Royal Academy exhibited a painting of Joanna Kollmann by Emma Kendrick.
