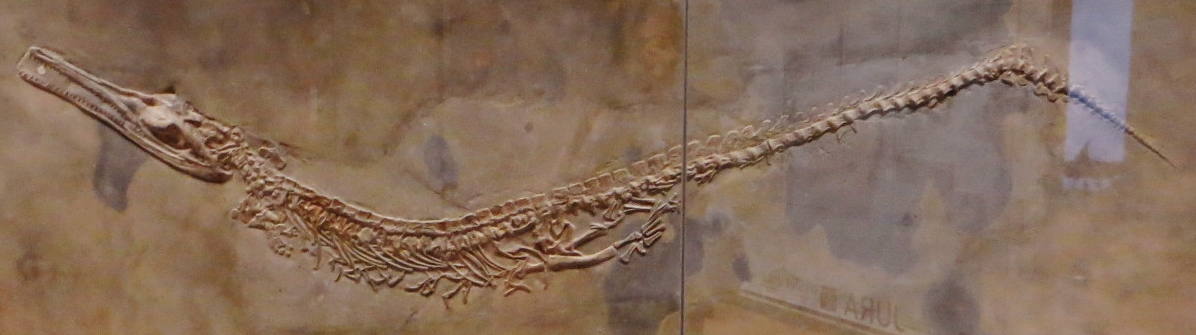
- C. suevicus skeleton
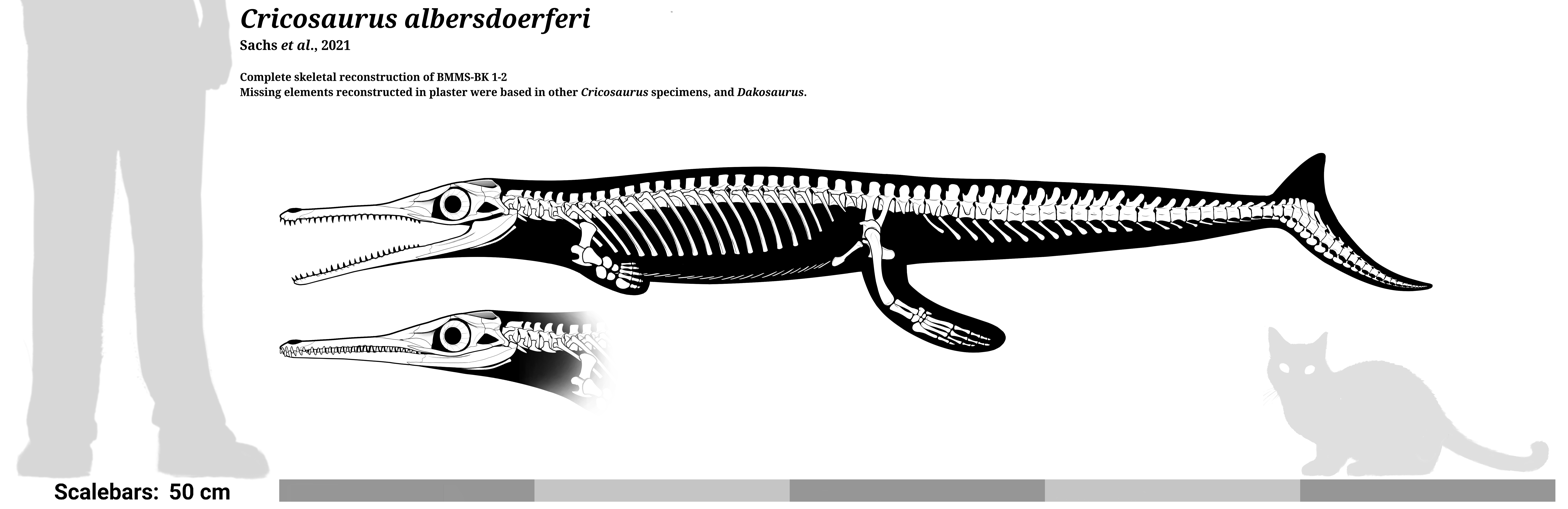
- Skeletal reconstruction of C. albersdoerferi

Scientific classification
- Kingdom: Animalia
- Phylum: Chordata
- Class: Reptilia
- Clade: Pseudosuchia
- Clade: Crocodylomorpha
- Suborder: †Thalattosuchia
- Family: †Metriorhynchidae
- Tribe: †Rhacheosaurini
- Genus: †Cricosaurus; Wagner, 1858

Species
- C. albersdoerferi Sachs et al., 2021; C. araucanensis Gasparini & Dellapé, 1976; C. bambergensis Sachs et al., 2019; C. elegans (Wagner, 1852 (type)); C. gracilis Philips, 1871; C. lithographicus Herrera et al., 2013; C. macrospondylus? Koken, 1883; C. puelchorum Herrera, Fernández & Vennari, 2021; C. rauhuti Herrera et al., 2021; C. saltillensis Buchy et al., 2006; C. suevicus (Fraas, 1901); C. vignaudi Frey et al., 2002

Synonyms
- Enaliosuchus? Koken, 1883

= Cricosaurus =

Cricosaurus Temporal range: Oxfordian-Valanginian ~160–136 Ma

Extinct genus of reptiles

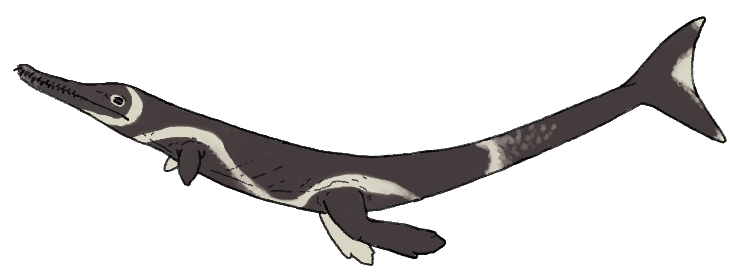
Life reconstruction of C. albersdoerferi

Cricosaurus is an extinct genus of marine crocodyliforms of the Late Jurassic. belonging to the family Metriorhynchidae. The genus was established by Johann Andreas Wagner in 1858 for three skulls from the Tithonian (Late Jurassic) of Germany. The name Cricosaurus means "Ring lizard", and is derived from the Greek Krikos- ("ring") and σαῦρος -sauros ("lizard"). It was a relatively small reptile, with C. suevicus and C. araucanensis measuring 2 m (6.6 ft) and 3.2 m (10 ft) in total body length, respectively.

== Discovery ==
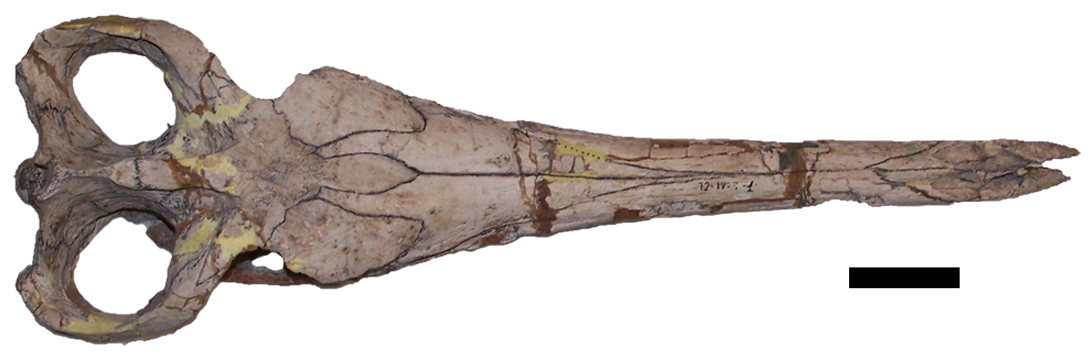
Holotype skull of C. araucanensis

Cricosaurus was first named by Wagner in 1858 based on three specimens from a quarry in Daiting, (Bavaria, Germany), as a reclassification of a specimen he had previously described in 1852 ("Stenosaurus" elegans, "Stenosaurus" being a misspelling of Steneosaurus).

Several other species have since been named, including C. suevicus by Fraas in 1901 (originally as a species of Geosaurus). One former species, C. medius (named by Wagner in 1858) has since been reclassified as a junior synonym of Rhacheosaurus gracilis. Fossil specimens referrable to Cricosaurus are known from Late Jurassic deposits in England, France, Switzerland, Germany, Argentina (Vaca Muerta), Cuba (Jagua Formation), and Mexico (La Caja and Pimienta Formations). and from the earliest Cretaceous (lower Berriasian) of Argentina. C. schroederi from Valanginian of Germany is later reclassified to Enalioetes.

== Classification ==
The original three skulls (all assigned to different species) were poorly known, and the genus had been considered a junior synonym of Metriorhynchus, Geosaurus or Dakosaurus by different palaeontologists in the past. Some phylogenetic analysis did not support the monophyly of Cricosaurus, However, a more comprehensive analysis in 2009 showed that the species contained in Cricosaurus were valid, and furthermore that several long-snouted species formerly classified in the related genera Geosaurus, Enaliosuchus and Metriorhynchus were in fact more closely related to the original specimens of Cricosaurus, and thus were re-classified into this genus.

Cladogram after Young et al. (2020).

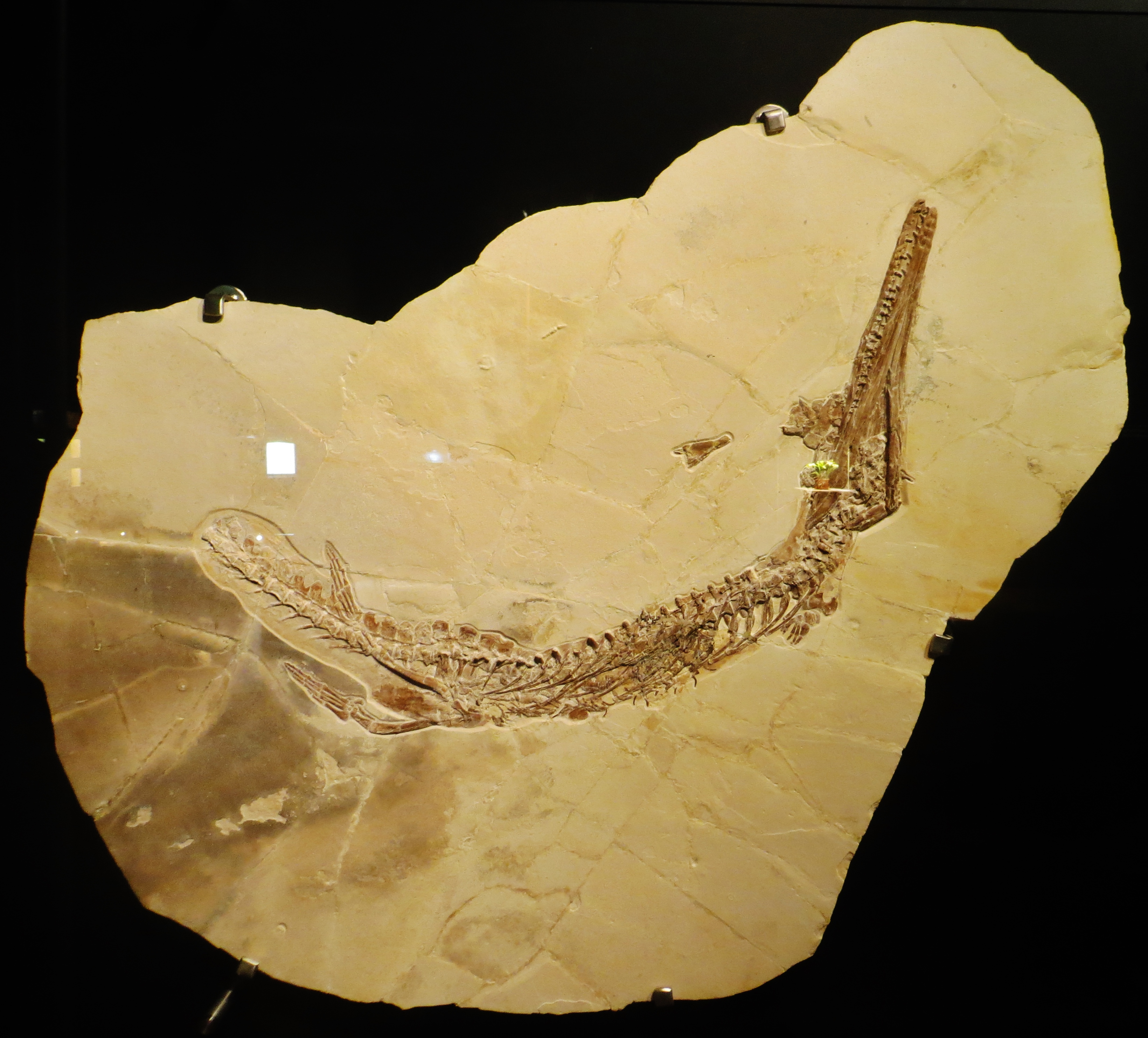
C. bambergensis fossil

- Rhacheosaurini
  - - Metriorhynchus palpebrosus
    - - Cricosaurus saltillensis
      - - Swiss rhacheosaurin
        - cf. Cricosaurus macrospondylus
  - - Metriorhynchinae indet. (USNM 19640)
    - - Rhacheosaurus gracilis
      - cf. Cricosaurus sp.
      - - - Cricosaurus araucanensis
          - Cricosaurus lithographicus
          - Cricosaurus schroederi
          - Cricosaurus vignaudi
        - - Cricosaurus bambergensis
          - - Cricosaurus suevicus
            - Cricosaurus elegans
            - Solnhofen Cricosaurus (C. albersdoerferi)

Cladogram after Sachs et al. (2021):

- Metriorhynchidae
  - Geosaurinae
  - Metriorhynchinae
    - Thalattosuchus
    - - Gracilineustes
      - - Maledictosuchus
        - - Metriorhynchus
          - Rhacheosaurini
            - Rhacheosaurus
            - Cricosaurus
              - - C. albersdoerferi
                - C. bambergensis
                - C. elegans
                - C. puelchorum
                - C. suevicus
              - - C. rauhuti
                - - C. schroederi
                  - - C. vignaudi
                    - - C. lithographicus
                      - - C. araucanensis

== Paleobiology ==
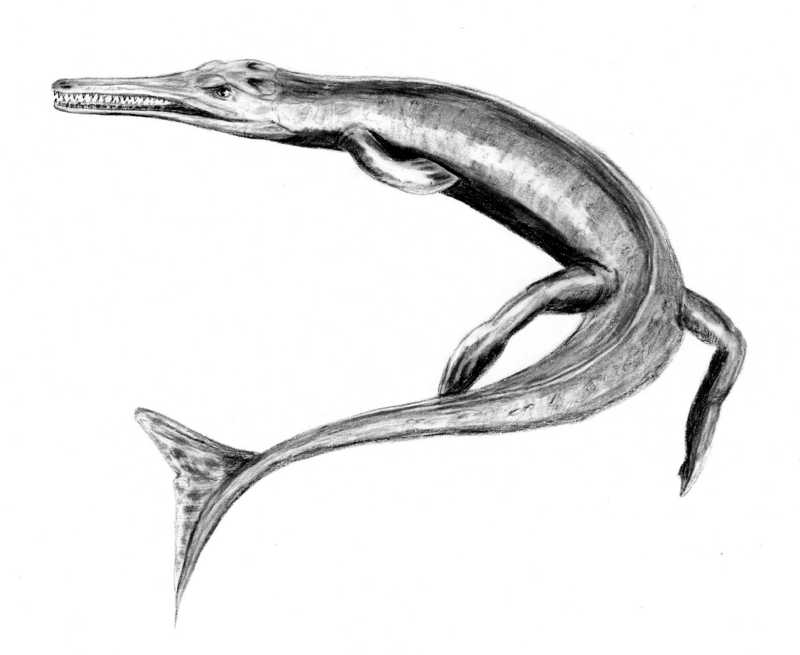
Restoration of C. suevicus

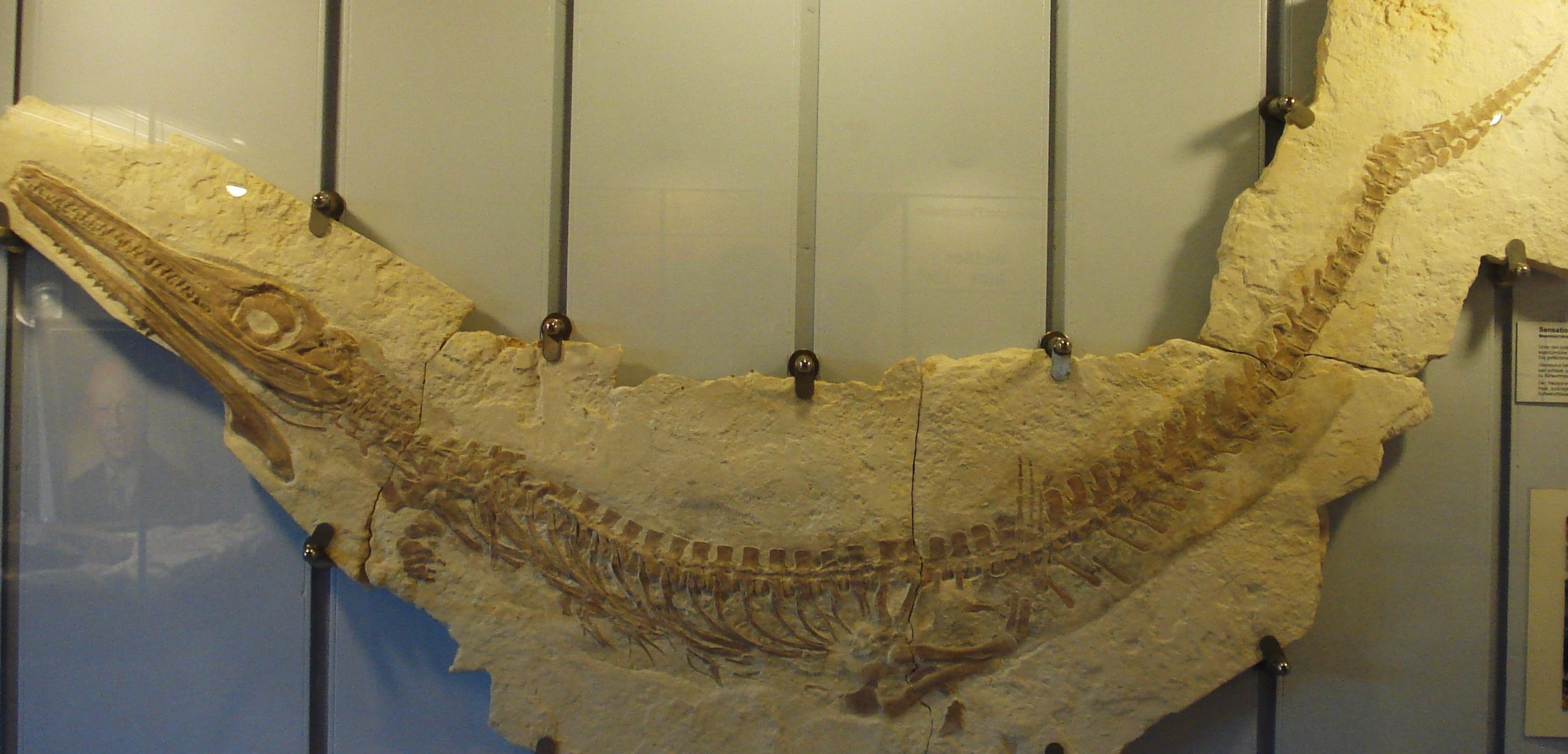
Holotype of Cricosaurus albersdoerferi

All currently known species would have been three metres or less in length. When compared to living crocodilians, Cricosaurus can be considered moderate to small-sized. Its body was streamlined for greater hydrodynamic efficiency, which along with its finned tail made it a more efficient swimmer than modern crocodilian species.

=== Salt glands ===
Recent examination of the fossil specimens of Cricosaurus araucanensis have shown that both juveniles and adults of this species had well-developed salt glands. This means that it would have been able to "drink" salt-water from birth (necessary for a pelagic animal) and eat prey that have the same ionic concentration as the surrounding sea water (i.e. cephalopods) without dehydrating. Adult specimens of Metriorhynchus also have these well-developed salt glands.

=== Niche partitioning ===
Several species of metriorhynchids are known from the Mörnsheim Formation (Solnhofen limestone, early Tithonian) of Bavaria, Germany: Cricosaurus suevicus, Dakosaurus maximus, Geosaurus giganteus and Rhacheosaurus gracilis. It has been hypothesised that niche partitioning enabled several species of crocodyliforms to co-exist. The top predators of this Formation appear to be D. maximus and G. giganteus, which were large, short-snouted species with serrated teeth. The long-snouted C. suevicus and R. gracilis would have fed mostly on fish, although the more lightly built Rhacheosaurus may have specialised towards feeding on small prey. In addition to these four species of metriorhynchids, a moderate-sized species of Steneosaurus was also contemporaneous.

From the Nusplingen Plattenkalk (early Tithonian) of southern Germany, both C. suevicus and Dakosaurus maximus are contemporaneous. As with Solnhofen, C. suevicus feed upon fish, while D. maximus was the top predator.

=== Possible viviparity ===
The hip of Cricosaurus araucanensis contains several features that create an unusually large pelvic opening. The acetabulum, or femur articulation on the hip, is placed very far towards of the bottom of the body relative to the vertebral column, and the sacral ribs are angled downwards at 45°, further increasing the distance between the vertebral column and the pubis-ischium. The hip was effectively a vertical ellipse in cross-section, being 120 millimetres (4.7 in) tall and 100 millimetres (3.9 in) wide. In other pseudosuchians like Steneosaurus, Machimosaurus, and Pelagosaurus, the sacral ribs are less angled and more horizontal; in this way, Cricosaurus is actually more similar to aquatic reptiles like Chaohusaurus, Utatsusaurus, and Keichousaurus, the latter of which live birth has been suggested for. In an evaluation of different reproductive hypotheses for Cricosaurus and other metriorhynchids, Herrera et al. considered viviparity more likely than oviparity.
