= Ernst Koken =

German paleontologist (1860–1912)

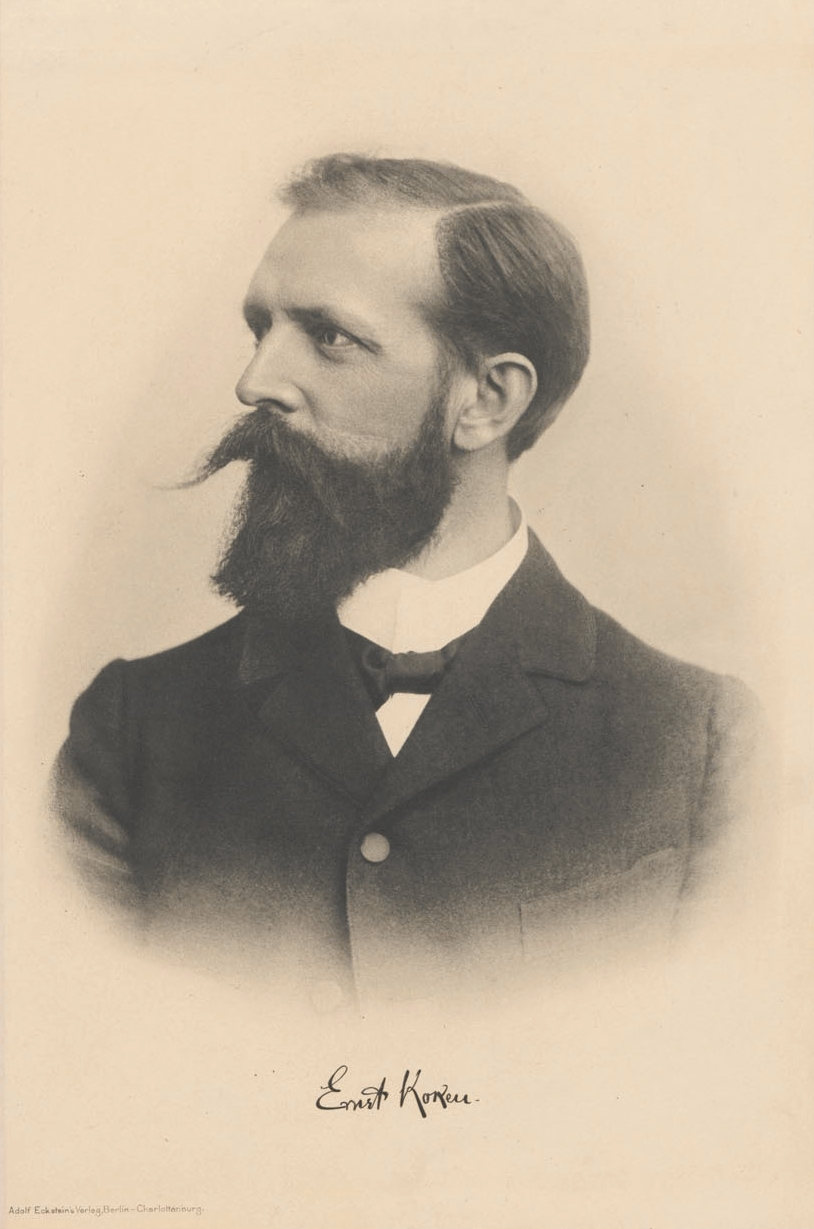

Ernst Friedrich Rudolph Karl Koken and from 1907 as von Koken (29 May 1860 – 21 November 1912) was a German geologist and paleontologist. He served as a professor of paleontology at the University of Tübingen.

== Life and work ==
Koken was born in Braunschweig where his father Hermann was a clerk. After local studies he went to the University of Göttingen with studies in Zurich and Berlin. He received a doctorate in 1884 with studies under Wilhelm Dames and Ernst Beyrich. He completed his habilitation as an assistant to Beyrich and became a lecturer at the University of Berlin in 1888. In 1891 he joined the University of Königsberg as a professor to succeed Wilhelm Branco and in 1895 he moved to the University of Tübingen to succeed Branco again, and where he worked until his death. He was involved in establishing the geological and paletontological institute and establishing its collections. His students included Friedrich von Huene.

Koken studied Cretaceous dinosaurs from Germany and wrote about them in 1887. He also took an interest in the otoliths of fishes. He visited the Salt Range in British India and took an interest in the Permian.

Koken was ennobled in 1907 for his contributions to science.
