= Engelbostel =

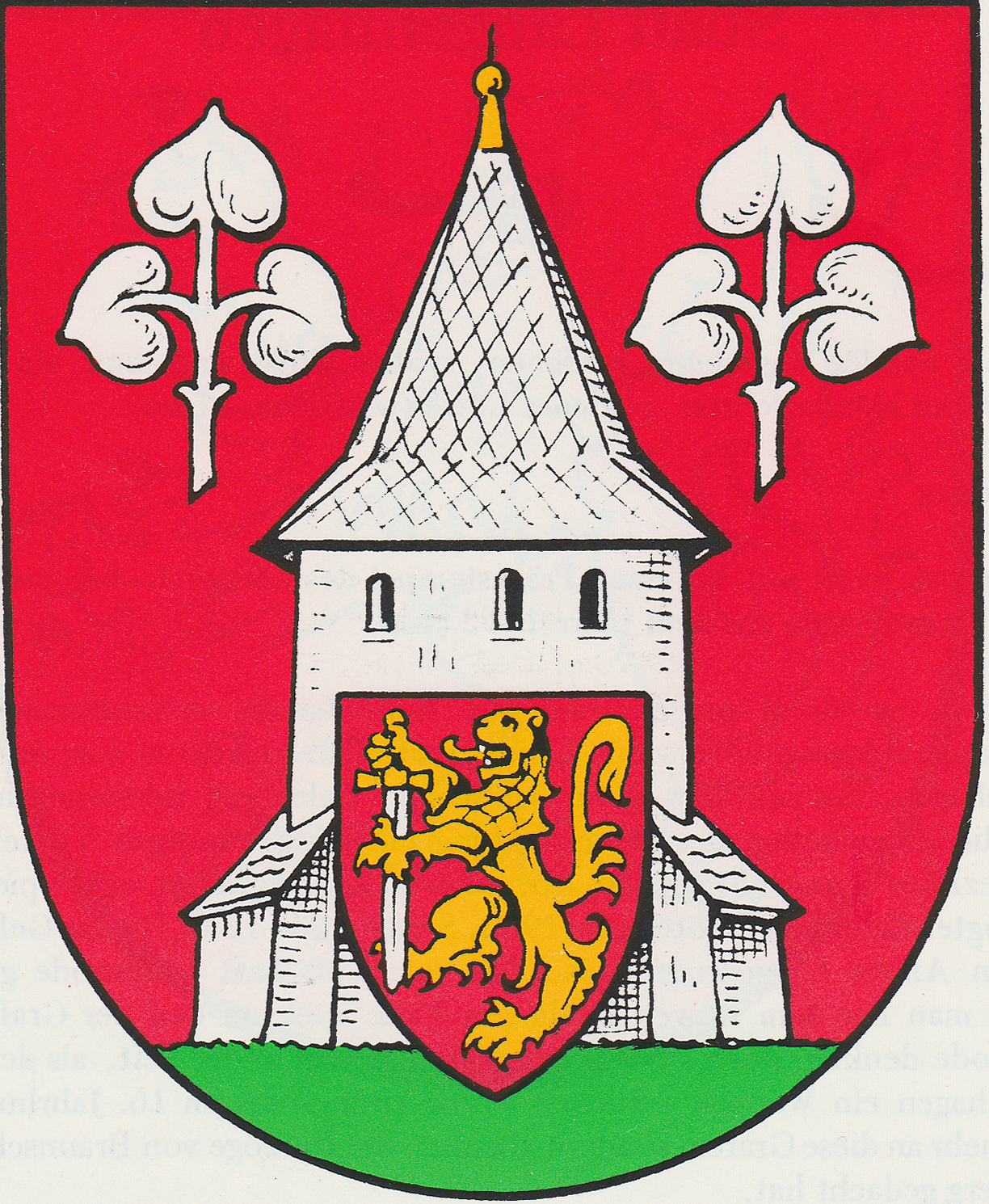
- Coat of arms

- Location within Germany
- Coordinates: 52.446751°N 9.660072°E
- Country: Germany
- Region: Hanover region
- City: Langenhagen
- Elevation: 55 m (180 ft)

Population (31 December 2010)
  - Total: 3,000
- Postal code: 30855
- Area code: 0511

Engelbostel is a district of the city of Langenhagen in the Hanover region. It was independent until 1974 when the village was incorporated into Langenhagen. The town is located southwest of the Hannover-Langenhagen airport. To the east is Schulenburg, and to the west are the town of Garbsen and the villages of Berenbostel and Stelingen.

== History ==
In 2008 Engelbostel celebrated its 975-year anniversary, but the site was probably established around the year 900. The archaeologist Helmut Plath considers that St. Gallenhof, the nucleus of the town, was present by 1100 CE. It was assigned to the parish of Saint Mary's of Hanover. In 1196 the church building was given by the Grafen von Roden to the monastery of Marienwerder. The 15th century church was built on the foundations of its predecessors, and the steeple remains. The nave was attached to it in 1788.

The parish records for the year 1808 report 64 homes in the town. The name "Engelbostel" is derived from the original "Endelindebostelde", which means something like: "castle of the noblemen." Engelbostel is historically the oldest part of the city of Langenhagen. In 1928 the previously unincorporated Gutsbezirk Kananohe was combined with the community of Engelbostel.

== Economy and infrastructure ==
The town has a primary school and the nursery of Martin Parish. Engelbostel Elementary School is a social center of the town developed into an all-day school. Engelbostel is served by three lines of Üstra and Regiobus Hanover. There are connections to Hanover-North Port (light rail), Langenhagen, Garbsen and Stöckendrebber .

== People ==
The composer and music theorist Augustus Frederic Christopher Kollmann came from Engelbostel, later moving to London.

- Oliver Kalkofe (born 1965), German satirist, columnist, book author, actor, voice actor, writer and audiobook narrator

== Gallery ==
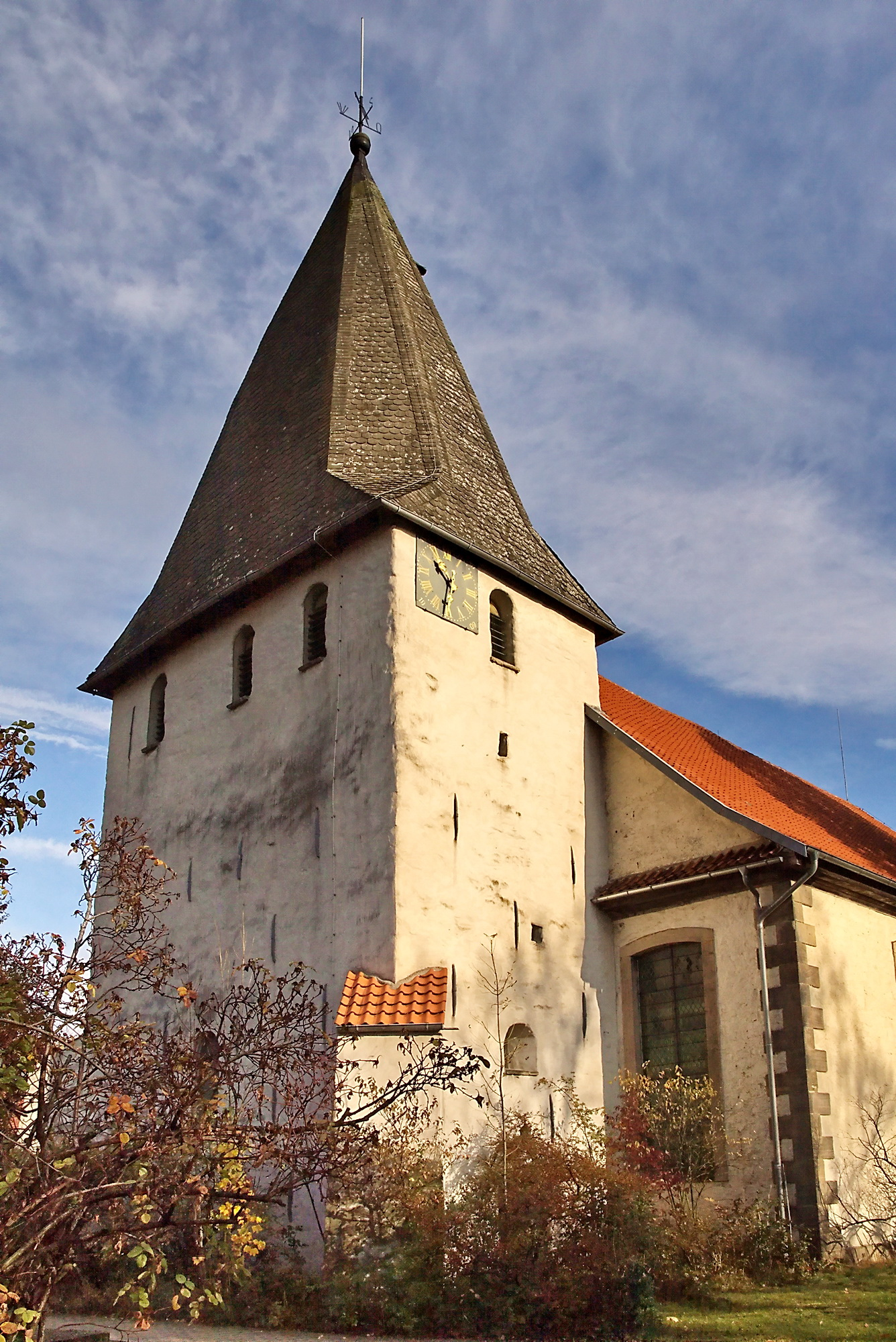
Tower of St. Martin's Church

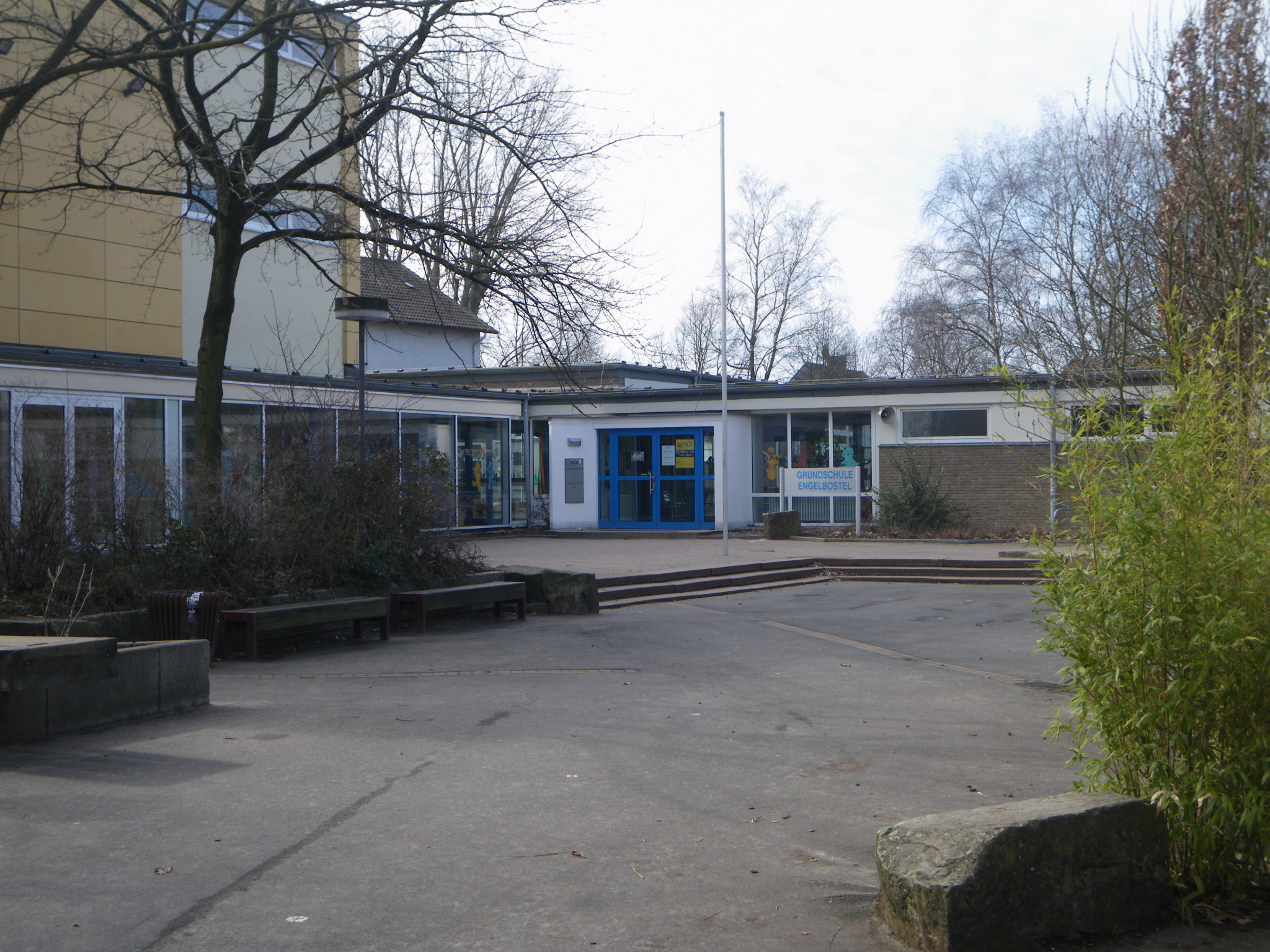
Grundschule

== Notes and references ==
Citations

Sources

- Mlynek, Klaus; Röhrbein, Waldemar R. (1991). Hannover Chronik: Von den Anfängen bis zur Gegenwart. Zahlen. Daten. Fakten. Schlütersche. ISBN 978-3-87706-319-4.

External links

- Website der Stadt Langenhagen
- Website der Ortschaft Engelbostel
- Näheres zum Kirchbau der Martinskirche
