= Paleobiota of the Green River Formation =

Geological formation in the Intermountain West of the United States

The Green River Formation is a geological formation located in the Intermountain West of the United States, in the states of Colorado, Utah, and Wyoming. It comprises sediments deposited during the Early Eocene in a series of large freshwater lakes: Lake Gosiute, Lake Uinta, and Fossil Lake (the last containing Fossil Butte National Monument). It preserves a high diversity of freshwater fish, birds, reptiles, and mammals, with some sections of the formation (including Fossil Lake and the Parachute Creek member of Lake Uinta) qualifying as Konservat-Lagerstätten due to their extremely well-preserved fossils.

== Cartilaginous fish ==
Family	Genus	Species	Member	Abundance	Notes	Image
†Asterotrygonidae	†Asterotrygon	†A. maloneyi Carvalho, Maisey & Grande, 2004	Fossil Lake		An Asterotrygonidae stingray of uncertain higher affinities.	
†Heliobatidae	†Heliobatis	†H. radians Marsh, 1877	Fossil Lake		A Heliobatid stingray of uncertain higher affinities. H. radians synonymy: Dasyatis species Haseman, 1912; Palaeodasybatis discus Fowler, 1947; Xiphotrygon acutidens Cope, 1879; Xyphotrygus species Romer, 1971	

== Bony fish ==
Primarily based on Grande (2001), with changes where necessary:

=== Acipenseriformes ===
Family	Genus	Species	Member	Abundance	Notes	Image
Polyodontidae	†Crossopholis	†C. magnicaudatus Cope, 1883	Fossil Lake		A paddlefish.	

=== Lepisosteiformes ===
Family	Genus	Species	Member	Abundance	Notes	Image
Lepisosteidae	Atractosteus	†A. atrox (Leidy, 1873)	Fossil Lake		An alligator gar relative. A. atrox is the largest Green River gar.	
Lepisosteidae	Atractosteus	†A. simplex (Leidy 1873)	Fossil Lake; Lake Gosiute?		An alligator gar relative.	
Lepisosteidae	†Cuneatus	†C. cuneatus (Cope, 1884)	Fossil Lake? Lake Gosiute; Lake Uinta		A Cuneatini tribe gar.	
Lepisosteidae	†Cuneatus	†C. wileyi Grande, 2010	Lake Uinta		A Cuneatini tribe gar.	
Lepisosteidae	Lepisosteus	†L. bemisi Grande, 2010	Fossil Lake		A Lepisosteini tribe gar.	
Lepisosteidae	†Masillosteus	†M. janeae Grande, 2010	Fossil Lake		A Cuneatini tribe gar.	

=== Amiiformes ===
Family	Genus	Species	Member	Abundance	Notes	Image
Amiidae	Amia	†A. pattersoni Grande & Bemis, 1998	Fossil Lake; Lake Gosiute		An amiid bowfin.	
Amiidae	†Cyclurus	†C. gurleyi (Romer & Fryxell, 1928)	Fossil Lake	Only 8 specimens known	An amiid related to modern bowfins.	

=== Hiodontiformes ===
Family	Genus	Species	Member	Abundance	Notes	Image
Hiodontidae	Hiodon	†H. falcatus (Grande, 1979)	Fossil Lake		A hiodontid. First described as Eohiodon falcatus (1979).	

=== Osteoglossiformes ===
Family	Genus	Species	Member	Abundance	Notes	Image
Osteoglossidae	†Phareodus	†P. encaustus (Cope, 1871)	Fossil Lake; Lake Gosiute		A phareodontine bonytongue.	
Osteoglossidae	†Phareodus	†P. testis (Leidy, 1873)	Fossil Lake		A phareodontine bonytongue.	

=== Ellimmichthyiformes ===
Family	Genus	Species	Member	Abundance	Notes	Image
†Armigatidae	†Diplomystus	†D. dentatus Cope, 1877	Fossil Lake; Lake Gosiute; Lake Uinta		An armigatid ellimmichthyiform.	

=== Clupeiformes ===
Family	Genus	Species	Member	Abundance	Notes	Image
Clupeidae	†Gosiutichthys	†G. parvus Grande, 1982	Lake Gosiute		A clupeine clupeid herring relative.	
Clupeidae	†Knightia	†K. alta (Leidy, 1873)	Fossil Lake; Lake Gosiute; Lake Uinta		A pellonuline clupeid herring relative.	
Clupeidae	†Knightia	†K. eocaena Jordan, 1907	Fossil Lake; Lake Gosiute; Lake Uinta	The most common articulated vertebrate fossil worldwide.	A pellonuline clupeid herring relative.	

=== Gonorynchiformes ===
Family	Genus	Species	Member	Abundance	Notes	Image
Gonorynchidae	†Notogoneus	†N. osculus Cope, 1885	Fossil Lake		A beaked sandfish. Last gonorynchid known from North America. Bottom feeding trace fossils are attributed to N. osculus.	

=== Cypriniformes ===
Family	Genus	Species	Member	Abundance	Notes	Image
Catostomidae	†Amyzon	†A. gosiutensis Grande, Eastman, & Cavender, 1982	Lake Gosiute		An ictiobine sucker.	

=== Siluriformes ===
Family	Genus	Species	Member	Abundance	Notes	Image
†Hypsidoridae	†Hypsidoris	†H. farsonensis Lundberg & Case, 1970	Lake Gosiute	Around 50 specimens	A hypsidorid catfish.	
†Astephidae	†Astephus	†A. antiquus (Leidy, 1873)	Fossil Lake; Lake Gosiute; Lake Uinta	Over 200 specimens; only one specimen known from Fossil Lake.	An astephid catfish.	

=== Salmoniformes ===
Family	Genus	Species	Member	Abundance	Notes	Image
Esocidae	Esox	†E. kronneri Grande, 1999	Fossil Lake	1 specimen	A pike, presumably related to the modern pickerels of North America. Likely native to surrounding streams or rivers and not the lakes.	

=== Percopsiformes ===
Family	Genus	Species	Member	Abundance	Notes	Image
Percopsidae	†Amphiplaga	†A. brachyptera Cope, 1877	Fossil Lake		A trout-perch relative. Includes the jr synonym Erismatopterus endlichi (1877)	
Percopsidae	†Erismatopterus	†E. levatus (Cope, 1870)	Lake Gosiute; Lake Uinta		A trout-perch relative. First described as Cyprinodon levatus (1870) includes the jr synonym Erismatopterus rickseckeri (1871)	

=== Carangiformes ===
Family	Genus	Species	Member	Abundance	Notes	Image
Latidae	†Mioplosus	†M. labracoides Cope, 1877	Fossil Lake; Lake Gosiute; Lake Uinta		A lates perches relative.	

=== Acanthuriformes ===
Family	Genus	Species	Member	Abundance	Notes	Image
Moronidae	†Cockerellites	†C. liops (Cope, 1877)	Fossil Lake	common	A planktivorous/insectivorous temperate bass. First described as Priscacara liops (1877); First moved to Cockerellites liops in 1923.	
Moronidae	†Hypsiprisca	†H. hypsacantha (Cope, 1886)	Fossil Lake	rare	A temperate bass. First named Priscacara hypsacantha 1886)	
Moronidae	†Hypsiprisca	†H. sp.	Fossil Lake	rare	An undescribed species of Hypsiprisca. A slenderer species with a more rounded tail fin outline.	
Moronidae	†Priscacara	†P. serrata Cope, 1877	Fossil Lake; Lake Uinta		A temperate bass.	
Moronidae	†Priscacara	†P. sp. a	Fossil Lake	1 specimen	An undescribed Priscacara; Specimens have a rounder body and weak dorsal spines.	
Moronidae	†Priscacara	†P. sp. b.	Fossil Lake	1 specimen	An undescribed Priscacara; Possibly a new species or a variant specimen with 4 anal spines.	

=== Incertae sedis ===
Family	Genus	Species	Member	Abundance	Notes	Image
†Asineopidae	†Asineops	†A. squamifrons Cope, 1870	Fossil Lake; Lake Gosiute; Lake Uinta		An acanthomorph of uncertain affinities Possibly a percopsiform, polymixiiform, or perciform.	
†Asineopidae	†Asineops	A. sp.	Fossil Lake		An undescribed Asineops species Restricted to Fossil Lake.	

== Amphibians ==
=== Frogs ===
Family	Genus	Species	Member	Abundance	Notes	Image
Pelodytidae	†Aerugoamnis	†A. paulus Henrici et al., 2013	Fossil Lake	2 specimens	A stem-relative of parsley frogs.	

=== Salamanders ===
Family	Genus	Species	Member	Abundance	Notes	Image
Amphiumidae	†Paleoamphiuma	†P. tetradactylum Rieppel & Grande, 1998	Fossil Lake		A sirenid salamander.	

== Reptiles ==
=== Squamates ===
Family	Genus	Species	Member	Abundance	Notes	Image
Boidae	†Boavus	†B. idelmani Gilmore, 1938	Fossil Lake		A boa.	
Dactyloidae	†Afairiguana	†A. avius Conrad et al., 2007	Fossil Lake		A stem-anole.	
Shinisauridae	†Bahndwivici	†B. ammoskius Conrad, 2006	Fossil Lake		A relative of the Chinese crocodile lizard.	
Tropidophiidae?	†Dunnophis	D. sp.	Fossil Lake		An undescribed possible dwarf boa.	
Varanidae	†Saniwa	†S. ensidens Leidy, 1870	Fossil Lake		A stem-monitor lizard.	
Incertae sedis	Indeterminate	Indeterminate	Lake Uinta (Parachute Creek)	1 specimen	A possible gecko or iguanid Preserved with soft tissue and skin, but bones dissolved.	
Incertae sedis	Indeterminate	Indeterminate	Lake Uinta (Parachute Creek)	1 specimen	A relative of Shinisaurids; Preserved with soft tissue and skin, but bones dissolved.	

=== Crocodilians ===
Family	Genus	Species	Member	Abundance	Notes	Image
Alligatoridae	†Tsoabichi	†T. greenriverensis Brochu, 2010	Fossil Lake		A caiman.	
Incertae sedis	†Borealosuchus	†B. wilsoni (Mook, 1959)	Fossil Lake		A eusuchian crocodyliform of uncertain affinities. Moved from Leidyosuchus wilsoni (1959)	
Incertae sedis	†Borealosuchus	Cf. †B. sp.	Fossil Lake		Indeterminate eusuchian bones close to Borealosuchus.	
Incertae sedis	"Crocodylus"	†"Crocodylus" acer Cope, 1882	Lake Uinta (Manti beds)	1 specimen	A Crocodyloidea of unplaced affinity. Not a Crocodylus species, but not given a new genus as of 2024.	
Incertae sedis	"Crocodylus"	Cf. †"Crocodylus" affinis Cope, 1871	Lake Gosiute		Bones close in morphology to †"Crocodylus" affinis A Crocodyloidea of unplaced affinity. Not a Crocodylus species, but not given a new genus as of 2024.	

=== Turtles ===
Family	Genus	Species	Member	Abundance	Notes	Image
Baenidae	†Chisternon	†C. undatum (Leidy, 1871)	Fossil Lake		A baenid.	
Dermatemydidae	†Baptemys	†B. wyomingensis Leidy, 1873	Fossil Lake		A dermatemydid.	
Dermatemydidae	†Baptemys	†B. Cf. wyomingensis Leidy, 1873	Lake Unita		A dermatemydid.	
Geoemydidae	†Echmatemys	†E. haydeni (Cope, 1873)		1 specimen	A geoemydid tortoise.	
Geoemydidae	†Echmatemys	†E. naomi (Leidy, 1871)	Fossil Lake	1 specimen	A geoemydid tortoise.	
Geoemydidae	†Echmatemys	†E. wyomingensis Leidy, 1872	Fossil Lake		A geoemydid tortoise.	
Testudinidae	†Hadrianus	†Cf. †H. corsoni (Leidy, 1871)	Fossil Lake		A tortoise species. A single complete hatchling	
Trionychidae	†Axestemys	A. sp.	Fossil Lake		A softshell turtle.	
Trionychidae	†Oliveremys	†O. uintaensis Cope, 1873	Fossil Lake		A softshell turtle.	
Trionychidae	†Plastomenus	†P. thomasii (Cope, 1872	Fossil Lake		A softshell turtle.	

== Birds ==
=== Lithornithiformes ===
Family	Genus	Species	Member	Abundance	Notes	Image
†Lithornithidae	†Lithornis	†L. grandei	Fossil Lake		A lithornithid. First described as Calciavis grandei.	
†Lithornithidae	†Pseudocrypturus	†P. cercanaxius	Fossil Lake		A lithornithid.	

=== Anseriformes ===
Family	Genus	Species	Member	Abundance	Notes	Image
†Presbyornithidae	†Presbyornis	†P. pervetus	Fossil Lake		A presbyornithid anseriform.	
Incertae sedis	†Paakniwatavis	†P. grandei	Fossil Lake		An anseriform of uncertain affinities.	

=== Galliformes ===
Family	Genus	Species	Member	Abundance	Notes	Image
†Gallinuloididae	†Gallinuloides	†G. wyomingensis	Fossil Lake		A gallinuloid galliform.	

=== Coliiformes ===
Family	Genus	Species	Member	Abundance	Notes	Image
†Sandcoleidae	†Anneavis	†A. annae	Fossil Lake		A sandcoleid mousebird.	
Incertae sedis	†Celericolius	†C. acriala	Fossil Lake		A stem-mousebird.	

=== Leptosomiformes ===
Family	Genus	Species	Member	Abundance	Notes	Image
incertae sedis	†Plesiocathartes	†P. major Weidig, 2006	Fossil Lake		A stem-cuckoo roller.	
incertae sedis	†Plesiocathartes	†P. wyomingensis Weidig, 2006	Fossil Lake		A stem-cuckoo roller	

=== Coraciiformes ===
Family	Genus	Species	Member	Abundance	Notes	Image
Primobucconidae	†Primobucco	†P. mcgrewi	Fossil Lake		A primobucconid coraciiform.	
Incertae sedis	†Paracoracias	†P. occidentalis			A coraciiform.	

=== Piciformes ===
Family	Genus	Species	Member	Abundance	Notes	Image
Incertae sedis	†Neanis	†N. schucherti	Fossil Lake		A possible piciform of uncertain affinities.	
Incertae sedis	†Pristineanis	†P. kistneri	Fossil Lake (Fossil Butte Member); Lake Gosiute (Tipton tongue Member)	2 specimens	A possible piciform of uncertain affinities. First described as Primobucco kistneri (1973); Moved from Neanis kistneri 1976)	

=== Strisores ===
Family	Genus	Species	Member	Abundance	Notes	Image
Eocypselidae	†Eocypselus	†E. rowei	Fossil Lake		An eocypselid apodiform.	
Fluvioviridavidae	†Fluvioviridavis	†F. platyrhamphus Mayr & Daniels, 2001	Fossil Lake	2 specimens	A basal strisore, possibly a stem-frogmouth.	
Incertae sedis	†Prefica	†P. nivea	Fossil Lake		A stem-oilbird.	

=== Musophagiformes ===
Family	Genus	Species	Member	Abundance	Notes	Image
Musophagidae?	†Foro	†F. panarium	Fossil Lake	1 specimen	A possible stem-turaco.	

=== Mirandornithes ===
Family	Genus	Species	Member	Abundance	Notes	Image
Incertae sedis	†Juncitarsus	†J. merkeli	Fossil Lake		A stem-mirandornithine.	

=== Suliformes ===
Family	Genus	Species	Member	Abundance	Notes	Image
Fregatidae	†Limnofregata	L. azygosternon	Fossil Lake		An early frigatebird.	
Fregatidae	†Limnofregata	L. hasegawai	Fossil Lake		An early frigatebird	

=== Pelecaniformes ===
Family	Genus	Species	Member	Abundance	Notes	Image
Threskiornithidae	†Rhynchaeites	†R. mcfaddeni		1 specimen	Known from a largely complete specimen.	R. messelensis, a related species
Threskiornithidae	†Vadaravis	†V. brownae	Fossil Lake		Potentially a stem-ibis, but may be an indeterminate aequornithine.	

=== Charadriiformes ===
Family	Genus	Species	Member	Abundance	Notes	Image
Indeterminate	Indeterminate	Indeterminate	Lake Uinta	1 trace specimen	A shorebird Potentially the earliest record of recurvirostrids Known from a 3 footprint trackway.	

=== Gruiformes ===
Family	Genus	Species	Member	Abundance	Notes	Image
†Messelornithidae	†Messelornis	†M. nearctica	Fossil Lake		A messelornithid.	Specimen of a related species

=== Eufalconimorphae ===
Family	Genus	Species	Member	Abundance	Notes	Image
†Halcyornithidae	†Cyrilavis	†C. colburnorum	Fossil Lake		A halcyornithid.	
†Halcyornithidae	†Cyrilavis	†C. olsoni	Fossil Lake		A halcyornithid.	
†Messelasturidae	†Tynskya	†T. eocaena	Fossil Lake		A messelasturid.	
†Morsoravidae	†Consoravis	†C. turdirostris	Fossil Lake		A morsoravid.	
†Psittacopedidae	†Eofringillirostrum	†E. boudreauxi	Fossil Lake		A psittacopedid.	
†Vastanavidae	†Avolatavis	†A. tenens	Fossil Lake		A vastanavid.	
†Zygodactylidae	†Eozygodactylus	†E. americanus	Fossil Lake		A zygodactylid.	
†Zygodactylidae	†Zygodactylus	†Z. grandei	Fossil Lake		A zygodactylid.	

=== Neoaves incertae sedis ===
Family	Genus	Species	Member	Abundance	Notes	Image
Incertae sedis	†Nahmavis	†N. grandei	Fossil Lake	1 specimen	Either a stem-gruiform or a stem-charadriiform.	

Two other genera, "Eoeurypyga" (a stem-sunbittern) and "Wyomingcypselus" (an early apodiform) are mentioned only in a 2002 dissertation, and are presently nomina nuda.

=== Avian ichnofossils ===
Family	Genus	Species	Member	Abundance	Notes	Image
†Avipedidae	†Avipeda	Cf. †A. phoenix Vyalov, 1960	Lake Unita		Avian trackways with three forward facing toes without inter-digit webbing.	
†Ignotornidae	†Quadridigitus	†Q. semimembranus Lockley et al., 2021	Lake Unita		Avian trackways with three forward facing toes, a hallux, and inter-digit webbing.	
†Jindongornipodidae	†Jindongornipes	†J. falkbuckleyi Lockley et al., 2021	Lake Unita		Large avian trackways with four toes, and wide spread between digits II and IV.	
Incertae sedis	†Presbyornithiformipes	†P. feduccii Yang et al., 1995	Lake Uinta		Duck-like trackways with dabble marks attributed to Presbyornis.	

== Mammals ==
Partially based on Grande (1984). Aside from the few well-preserved mammals found in Fossil Lake, a majority of Green River mammals are based on isolated bones and teeth:

=== Metatheria ===
Family	Genus	Species	Member	Abundance	Notes	Image
†Herpetotheriidae	†Herpetotherium	†H. innominatum	Lake Gosiute; Lake Uinta		An opossum-like basal metatherian Originally described as Peratherium innominatum.	H. huntii, a related species
†Herpetotheriidae	†Herpetotherium	†H. knighti	Lake Gosiute		An opossum-like basal metatherian.	H. huntii, a related species

=== Cimolesta ===
Family	Genus	Species	Member	Abundance	Notes	Image
†Pantolestidae	†Palaeosinopa	†P. didelphoides	Fossil Lake		A semi-aquatic pantolestid.	

=== Chiroptera ===
Family	Genus	Species	Member	Abundance	Notes	Image
†Icaronycteridae	†Icaronycteris	†I. gunnelli	Fossil Lake	2 specimens	An icaronycterid bat.	
†Icaronycteridae	†Icaronycteris	†I. index	Fossil Lake	4 specimens	An icaronycterid bat.	
†Onychonycteridae	†Onychonycteris	†O. finneyi	Fossil Lake	2 specimens	An onychonycterid bat.	

=== Eulipotyphla ===
family	Genus	Species	Member	Abundance	Notes	Image
Nyctitheriidae	Nyctitherium	N. nitidum	Lake Gosiute		A nyctitheriid. Originally described as Talpavus nitidus.	
Nyctitheriidae	Nyctitherium	N. sp.	Lake Uinta		A nyctitheriid. Originally described as Talpavus nitidus.	

=== Pan-Carnivora ===
Family	Genus	Species	Member	Abundance	Notes	Image
Miacidae	Vulpavus	V. profectus	Lake Gosiute		A miacid.	
Miacidae	Indeterminate	indeterminate	Lake Gosiute; Lake Uinta		Indeterminate miacid bones.	
Sinopinae	Sinopa	S. minor	Lake Uinta		A sinopid hyaenodont.	S. rapax, a related species
Viverravidae	Viverravus	V. minutus	Lake Uinta		A viverravid.	
Incertae sedis	"Miacis"	"M." gracilis	Lake Uinta		A carnivoraform of uncertain affinities.	

=== Paraxonia ===
family	Genus	Species	Member	Abundance	Notes	Image
Mesonychidae	†Mesonyx?	Indeterminate	Lake Gosiute		Indeterminate mesonychid bones. First described as Mesonyx obtusidens Cope, 1872	

=== Pan-Perissodactyla ===
family	Genus	Species	Member	Abundance	Notes	Image
†Brontotheriidae	†Lambdotherium	†L. popoagicum	Fossil Lake		A small-sized basal brontothere.	
†Brontotheriidae	†L. sp.	Lake Unita		A small-sized basal brontothere. Reported from Powder Wash, Utah by Cope (1880)		
Equidae	†Protorohippus	†Aff. P. venticolus	Fossil Lake	2 specimens	An equid closely affiliated with P. venticolus.	
Equidae	Indeterminate	Indeterminate	Lake Gosiute; Lake Unita<	Indeterminate equiid bones. First identified as Hyracotherium sp.		
†Hyopsodontidae	†Hyopsodus	†H. minusculus	Lake Gosiute; Lake Uinta		A hyopsodontid.	
†Hyopsodontidae	†Hyopsodus	†H. paulus (=H. vicarius)	Lake Uinta		A hyopsodontid. includes H. vicarius specimens.	
†Hyopsodontidae	†Hyopsodus	†H. wortmani	Fossil Lake		A hyopsodontid.	
↑Hyrachyidae	↑Hyrachyus	Indeterminate	Lake Unita		Undeterminate Hyrachyus bones.	
Indeterminate	Indeterminate	Indeterminate	Fossil Lake	1 specimen	A juvenile tapiromorph, the largest mammal known from the formation. Initially described as Heptodon calciculus.	

=== Apatotheria ===
Family	Genus	Species	Member	Abundance	Notes	Image
Apatemyidae	Apatemys	A. chardini Jepsen, 1930	Fossil Lake	1 specimen	An apatemyid.	

=== Rodentia ===
Family	Genus	Species	Member	Abundance	Notes	Image
Ischyromyidae	Paramys	P. sp.	Lake Uinta		An ischyromyid rodent.	P. delicatus
Ischyromyidae	Thisbemys	T. sp.	Lake Gosiute		An undescribed ischyromyid rodent.	T. plicatus
Sciuravidae	Sciuravus	S. eucristadens (Burke, 1937)	Lake Uinta (Douglas Creek Member)		A sciuravid rodent. Originally described as Viverravus eucristadens (1937).	
Sciuravidae	Sciuravus	S. sp.	Lake Uinta		An undescribed sciuravid.	

=== Primatomorpha ===
Family	Genus	Species	Member	Abundance	Notes	Image
Microsyopidae	Microsyops	M. elegans	Lake Gosiute		A microsyopid stem-primate.	M. cardiorestes, a related species
Microsyopidae	Uintasorex	U. parvulus	Lake Gosiute		A microsyopid stem-primate.	
Notharctidae	Notharctus	N. sp.	Lake Gosiute		A notharctid adapiform.	N. tenebrosus
Notharctidae	Smilodectes	S. gracilis	Lake Uinta		A notharctid adapiform. Formerly included in Notharctus matthewi.	
Omomyidae	Anemorhysis	A. sp.	Lake Unita	1 specimen (lost?)	An omomyid primate. First named as Uintalacus nettingi (1958); Deemed Anemorhysis sp indeterminate (1976)	
Omomyidae	Omomys	O. carteri	Lake Uinta		An omomyid primate. Includes O. pucillus	
Omomyidae	Tetonius	T. sp.	Lake Uinta		An omomyid primate.	T. homunculus
Omomyidae	Washakius	W. insignis	Lake Gosiute		An omomyid primate.	

== Arthropoda ==
=== Arachnida ===
==== Acariformes ====
Family	Genus	Species	Member	Abundance	Notes	Image
Cheyletidae	Indeterminate	Indeterminate	Lake Unita	1 specimen	A Chelytidae mite. Found in thin sectioning of rock samples.	

==== Araneae ====
Family	Genus	Species	Member	Abundance	Notes	Image
Araneidae	Araneus	A. sp	Lake Gosiute	6 specimens	Possible orbweb-spiders, known from partial fossils First placed as Epeira sp.	
Hersiliidae	Hersiliola (sensu lato)	H. sp.	Lake Uinta (Parachute Creek Member)	1 male	A tree trunk spider.	
Selenopidae	Indeterminate	Indeterminate	Lake Uinta (Parachute Creek Member)	1 specimen	A female or juvenile selenopid spider.	
Thomisidae	Indeterminate	Indeterminate	Lake Uinta (Parachute Creek Member)	2 males, 1 juv female	Crab spiders.	
Uloboridae	Miagrammopes	M. sp.	Lake Uinta (Parachute Creek Member)	1 female, 2 males	A uloborid spider.	
Uloboridae	Indeterminate	Indeterminate	Lake Uinta (Parachute Creek Member)		A uloborid spider.	
Unidentified	†Araneaovoius (Scudder, 1878)	†A. columbiae		1 specimen	An orb-web spider egg sack. First described as "Aranea" columbiae (1878)	

==== Parasitiformes ====
Family	Genus	Species	Member	Abundance	Notes	Image
Ixodidae	Ixodes	†"I." tertiarius Scudder, 1885	Lake Uinta (Laney Member)	1 specimen	A punitive ixodid hard tick. Type specimen declared lost species considered nomen dubium by Dunlop (2011)	

==== Scorpiones ====
Family	Genus	Species	Member	Abundance	Notes	Image
Buthidae	†Uintascorpio	†U. halandrasi Perry, 1995	Lake Uinta (Parachute Creek Member)	1 specimen	A buthid scorpion.	

=== Crustacea ===
==== Branchiopoda ====
Family	Genus	Species	Member	Abundance	Notes	Image
Cyclestheriidae	†Cyclestherioides	†C. wyomingensis	Lake Gosiute (Laney)		A cyclestheriid clam shrimp.	
Lynceidae	†Prolynceus	†P. laneyensis	Lake Gosiute (Laney)		A clam shrimp.	

==== Decapods ====
Family	Genus	Species	Member	Abundance	Notes	Image
Palaemonidae	†Bechleja	†B. rostrata	Fossil Lake		A palaemonid shrimp.	
Cambaridae	Procambarus	†P. primaevus	Fossil Lake		A cambarid crayfish.	

==== Ostracoda ====
Family	Genus	Species	Member	Abundance	Notes	Image
Candonidae	Candona	C. artesensis Swain, 1964	Fossil Lake; Lake Unita		A candonid ostracod.	
Candonidae	Candona	C. rangliensis Swain, 1964	Fossil Lake; Lake Unita		A candonid ostracod.	
Candonidae	Candona	C. whitei Scott & Smith, 1951	Fossil Lake; Lake Gosiute; Lake Unita		A candonid ostracod.	
Candonidae	Tuberocypris	T. centronotus Swain, 1964	Lake Unita		A candonid ostracod.	
†Cyprideidae	†Cypridea	†C. bisulcata Swain, 1949	Lake Unita		A cyprideid ostracod.	
Cyprididae	†Advenocypris	†A. umbonata Swain, 1964	Lake unita		A cypridid ostracod.	
Cyprididae	Hemicyprinotus	†H. watsonensis Swain, 1964	Lake unita		A cypridid ostracod. One described subspecies H. watsonensis emaciata	
Cyprididae	Heterocypris	†H. riflensis Swain, 1964	Lake unita		A cypridid ostracod.	
Cyprididae	Heterocypris	†H. whiteriverensis Swain, 1964	Lake unita		A cypridid ostracod.	
Cyprididae	Potamocypris	†P. williamsi Swain, 1964	Fossil Lake; Lake Unita		A cypridid ostracod.	
Cyprididae	†Procyprois	†P. ravenridgensis Swain, 1964	Lake Unita		A cypridid ostracod. Male and female specimens show shell sexual dimorphism	
Cyprididae	Pseudoeucypris	†P. pagei (Swain) Swain, 1956	Lake Unita		A cypridid ostracod. First described as Candona pagei (1949); Moved from Cypris pagei (1956)	
Cyprididae	Scottia	†S. subquadrata Swain, 1964	Lake Unita		A cypridid ostracod.	
Cyprididae	Stenocypris	Cf. S. sinuata G.W. Müller, 1898	Lake Unita		A cypridid ostracod.	
Limnocytheridae	Limnocythere	L. sp.	Lake Unita		Indistinct limnocytherid fossils.	
Limnocytheridae	Metacypris	†M. paracordata Swain, 1964	Lake Unita		A limnocytherid ostracod.	
Notodromadidae	Cyprois	†C. ephraimensis Swain, 1964	Fossil Lake; Lake Gosiute; Lake Unita		A notodromadid ostracod.	

=== Myriapoda ===
Family	Genus	Species	Member	Abundance	Notes	Image
Parajulidae	"Julus"	"J." telluster Scudder, 1878	Lake Gosiue	1 specimen	A parajulidae millipede in need of redescription. First described as Iulus telluster (1878).	

=== Insecta ===
==== Coleoptera ====
===== Adephaga =====
Family	Genus	Species	Member	Abundance	Notes	Image
Carabidae	Bembidion	†B. exoletum Scudder, 1876	Lake Unita	1 specimen	A Bembidiini tribe trechine ground beetle.	
Carabidae	†Carabites	†C. eocenicus Cockerell, 1921	Lake Unita		A ground beetle of uncertain subfamily affiliation.	
Carabidae	†Carabites	†C. exanimus Scudder, 1892	Lake Uinta	1 specimen	A ground beetle of uncertain subfamily affiliation.	
Carabidae	Harpalus	†H. veterum Cockerell, 1921	Lake Uinta		A Harpalini tribe harpaline ground beetle.	
Carabidae	Lebia	†L. protospiloptera Cockerell, 1921	Lake Unita		A Lebiini tribe harpaline ground beetle.	
Carabidae	†Neothanes	†N. testeus (Scudder, 1878)	Lake Gosiute	2 specimens	A ground beetle of uncertain subfamily affiliation. First named as Cychrus testeus (1878)	
Carabidae	Platynus	†P. caesus Scudder, 1890	Lake Gosiute	2 specimens	A Platynini tribe platynine ground beetle.	
Carabidae	Platynus	†P. senex Scudder, 1878	Lake Gosiute	1 specimen	A Platynini tribe platynine ground beetle.	
Dytiscidae	Laccophilus	Indeterminate	Lake Uinta	1 fragment	An indeterminate Laccophilini tribe predaceous diving beetle.	

===== Elateriformia =====
Family	Genus	Species	Member	Abundance	Notes	Image
Byrrhidae	"Nosodendron"	†"N." tritavum Scudder, 1890	Lake Gosiute	1 specimen	A pill beetle in need of redescription. First named as a Nosodendrid beetle.	
Elateridae	Cardiophorus	†C. exhumatus Cockerell, 1925	Lake Unita	1 specimen	A cardiophorine click beetle.	
Elateridae	Ctenicera	†C. velata (Scudder, 1876)	Lake Gosiute	1 specimen	A Prosternini tribe dendrometrine click beetle. First named as Corymbites velatus (1876).	
Elateridae	Oxygonus	†O. mortuus Scudder, 1876	Lake Uinta	1 specimen	A Prosternini tribe dendrometrine click beetle.	
Eucnemidae	Epiphanis	†E. deletus Scudder, 1876	Lake Unita	1 specimen	An Epiphanini tribe melasine false click beetle.	

===== Polyphaga - Bostrichiformia =====
Family	Genus	Species	Member	Abundance	Notes	Image
Ptinidae	Anobium	†A. deceptum Scudder, 1878	Lake Gosiute	1 specimen	An Anobiini tribe anobiine death-watch beetle.	
Ptinidae	Anobium	†A. lignitum Scudder, 1878	Lake Gosiute	1 specimen	An Anobiini tribe anobiine death-watch beetle.	
Ptinidae	Anobium	†A. ovale Scudder, 1878	Lake Gosiute	2 specimens	An Anobiini tribe anobiine death-watch beetle.	
Ptinidae	Stegobium	†S. defunctus (Scudder, 1876)	Lake Gosiute	1 specimen	A Stegobiini tribe anobiine death-watch beetle. First described as Sitodrepa defuncta (1876).	

===== Polyphaga - Cucujiformia =====
Family	Genus	Species	Member	Abundance	Notes	Image
Anthribidae	Choragus	†C. fictilis Scudder, 1890	Lake Gosiute	1 specimen	A Choragini tribe choragine fungus weevil.	
Anthribidae	Euparius	†E. elusus (Scudder, 1878)	Lake Gosiute	2 specimens	A Cratoparini tribe anthribine fungus weevil. First named as Cratoparis? elusus (1878)	
Anthribidae	Euparius	†E. repertus (Scudder, 1878)	Lake Gosiute	1 specimen	A Cratoparini tribe anthribine fungus weevil. First named as Cratoparis repertus (1878)	
Anthribidae	Ormiscus	†O. partitus (Scudder, 1890)	Lake Gosiute	1 specimen	A Zygaenodini tribe anthribine fungus weevil. First named as Hormiscus partitus (1890)	
Anthribidae	†Pseudochirotenon	†P. eocaenicus Legalov, 2018	Lake Unita	1 specimen	An Ecelonerini tribe anthribine fungus weevil.	
Anthribidae	Trigonorhinus	†T. pristinus (Scuddr, 1876)	Lake Gosiute	1 specimen	A Trigonorhinini tribe anthribine fungus weevil. First named as Brachytarsus pristinus (1876)	
Anthribidae	Tropideres	†T. remotus Scudder, 1893	Lake Gosiute	1 specimen	A Tropiderini tribe anthribine fungus weevil.	
Attelabidae	†Teretrum	†T. quiescitum Scudder, 1893	Lake Unita	1 specimen	An Auletini tribe rhynchitine leaf-rolling weevil.	
Belidae	†Paltorhynchus	†P. bisulcatus Scudder, 1893	Lake Unita	2 specimens	A Metrioxenini tribe oxycorynite belid weevil.	
Brentidae	Apionion	†A. evestigatum (Scudder, 1893)	Lake Unita	1 specimen	An Apionini tribe apionine primitive weevil.	
Brentidae	†Palaeonanophyes	†P. zherikhini Legalov, 2015	Lake Unita		A Nanophyini tribe nanophyine primitive weevil.	
Brentidae	Perapion	†P. rasnitsyni Legalov, 2018	Lake Uinta	1 specimen	An Aplemonini tribe apionine primitive weevil.	
Cerambycidae	Clytus	†C. pervetustus (Cockerell, 1921)	Lake Uinta		A Clytini tribe cerambycine long-horn beetle. First named as Lema pervetusta (1921)	
Cerambycidae	Saperda	†S. caroli Vitali, 2015	Lake Unita		A Saperdini tribe lamiine long-horn beetle.	
Chrysomelidae	Bruchus	†B. anilis Scudder, 1876	Lake Unita	1 specimen	A Bruchini tribe bruchine leaf beetle.	
Chrysomelidae	Cryptocephalus	†C. vetustus Scudder, 1878	Lake Gosiute	2 specimens	A Cryptocephalini tribe cryptocephaline leaf beetle.	
Chrysomelidae	†Denaeaspis	†D. chelonopsis Chaboo & Engel, 2009	Lake Unita	1 specimen	An Imatidiini tribe Cassidine tortoise beetle.	
Chrysomelidae	†Eosacantha	†E. delocranioides Chaboo & Engel, 2009	Lake Unita	1 specimen	A Notosacanthini tribe Cassidine tortoise beetle.	
Chrysomelidae	†Palaeatalasis	†P. monrosi Legalov, 2021	Lake Unita	1 specimen	A Megamerini tribe sagrine leaf beetle.	
Chrysomelidae	†Pulchritudo	†P. attenboroughi Krell & Vitali, 2021	Lake Uinta	1 specimen	A sagrine leaf beetle	
Cryptophagidae	Antherophagus	†A. priscus Scudder, 1876	Lake Gosiute	4 specimens	A Cryptophagini tribe cryptophagine silken fungus beetle.	
Curculionidae	Anthonomus	†A. revictus Scudder, 1890	Lake Gosiute	2 specimens	An Anthonomini tribe curculionine weevil.	
Curculionidae	Anthonomus	†A. soporus Scudder, 1890	Lake Gosiute; Lake Unita	7 specimens	An Anthonomini tribe curculionine weevil.	
Curculionidae	†Archaeoheilus	†A. deleticius (Scudder, 1893)	Lake Uinta	1 specimen	A Molytini tribe molytine weevil. First named as Pachylobius deleticius (1893); Moved from Hylobius deleticius (2015)	
Curculionidae	†Archaeoheilus	†A. ovalis Legalov, 2018	Lake Uinta	1 specimen	A Molytini tribe molytine weevil.	
Curculionidae	†Archaeoheilus	†A. packardii (Scudder, 1893)	Lake Gosiute	1 specimen	A Molytini tribe molytine weevil. First named as Hylobius packardii (1893).	
Curculionidae	†Archaeoheilus	†A. provectus (Scudder, 1876)	Lake Gosiute	2 specimens	A Molytini tribe molytine weevil. First named as Hylobius provectus (1876).	
Curculionidae	†Archaeoheilus	†A. scudderi Legalov, 2018	Lake Uinta	1 specimen	A Molytini tribe molytine weevil.	
Curculionidae	†Calandrites	†C. cineratius Scudder, 1893	Lake Gosiute; Lake Unita	13 specimens	A weevil of uncertain subfamilial affiliation.	
Curculionidae	†Calandrites	†C. defessus Scudder, 1893	Lake Gosiute; Lake Unita	4 specimens	A weevil of uncertain subfamilial affiliation.	
Curculionidae	Ceutorhynchus	†C. degravatus Scudder, 1893	Lake Unita	1 specimen	A Ceutorhynchini tribe ceutorhynchine weevil.	
Curculionidae	"Coniatus"	†"C." refractus Scudder, 1893	Lake Uinta		A Tropiphorini tribe entimine weevil of uncertain genus affiliations.	
Curculionidae	Cossonus	†C. rutus Scudder, 1893	Lake Unita	1 specimen	A Cossonini tribe cossonine weevil.	
Curculionidae	Cryptorhynchus	†C. annosus Scudder, 1893)	Lake Gosiute; Lake Unita	3 specimen	A Cryptorhynchini tribe cryptorhynchine weevil.	
Curculionidae	Cryptorhynchus	†"C". durus Scudder, 1893)	Lake Unita	1 specimen	A Tropiphorini tribe entimine weevil of uncertain generic affiliations.	
Curculionidae	"Dryocoetes"	†"D". carbonarius Scudder, 1876	Lake Gosiute	1 specimen	A scolytine bark beetle. Considered as genus and tribe incertae sedis by Legalov (2015).	
Curculionidae	Entimus	†E. primordialis Scudder, 1876	Lake Uinta	1 specimen	An Entimini tribe entimine weevil.	
Curculionidae	Epicaerus	†E. dilapsus (Scudder, 1893)	Lake Gosiute	1 specimen	A Geonemini tribe entimine weevil. First named as Phyxelis dilapsus (1893).	
Curculionidae	Epicaerus	†E. effossus (Scudder, 1876)	Lake Gosiute lake Uinta	numerous	A Geonemini tribe entimine weevil. First named as Eudiagogus effossus (1876).	
Curculionidae	Epicaerus	†E. eradicatus (Scudder, 1893)	Lake Unita	3 specimens	A Geonemini tribe entimine weevil. First named as Phyxelis eradicatus (1893).	
Curculionidae	Epicaerus	†E. evigoratus (Scudder, 1893)	Lake Unita	3 specimens	A Geonemini tribe entimine weevil. First named as Phyxelis evigoratus (1893).	
Curculionidae	Epicaerus	†E. exanimis (Scudder, 1876)	Lake Gosiute; Lake Unita	numerous	A Geonemini tribe entimine weevil. First named as Eudiagogus exanimis (1876).	
Curculionidae	Epicaerus	†E. excissus (Scudder, 1893)	Lake Unita	1 specimen	A Geonemini tribe entimine weevil. First named as Phyxelis excissus (1893).	
Curculionidae	Epicaerus	†E. fodinarum (Scudder, 1876)	Lake Gosiute	3 specimens	A Geonemini tribe entimine weevil. First named as Sitona fodinarum (1893).	
Curculionidae	Epicaerus	†E. saxatilis (Scudder, 1876)	Lake Gosiute; Lake Unita	numerous	A Geonemini tribe entimine weevil. First named as Eudiagogus saxatilis (1876).	
Curculionidae	Epicaerus	†E. subterraneus (Scudder, 1893)	Lake Gosiute; Lake Unita	Numerous	A Geonemini tribe entimine weevil. First named as Scythropus subterraneus (1893).	
Curculionidae	Epicaerus	†E. terrosus (Scudder, 1878)	Lake Gosiute; Lake Uinta	4 specimens	A Geonemini tribe entimine weevil. First named as Eudiagogus terrosus (1878).	
Curculionidae	Eudiagogus	†E. vossi Legalov, 2018	Lake Uinta	1 specimen	A Eudiagogini tribe entimine weevil.	
Curculionidae	†Extinctocentrinus	†E. brevirostris Legalov, 2018	Lake Uinta	1 specimen	An Apostasimerini tribe conoderine weevil.	
Curculionidae	Geraeus	†G. anvilis Legalov, 2018	Lake Uinta	1 specimen	An Apostasimerini tribe conoderine weevil.	
Curculionidae	Geraeus	†G. diruptus (Scudder, 1893)	Lake Uinta	1 specimen	An Apostasimerini tribe conoderine weevil. First named as Centrinus diruptus (1893)	
Curculionidae	Geraeus	†G. fossilis Legalov, 2018	Lake Uinta	1 specimen	An Apostasimerini tribe conoderine weevil.	
Curculionidae	"Gymnetron"	†G. lecontei Scudder, 1878	Lake Gosiute	1 specimen	A curculionine weevil of uncertain genus and tribal affiliations.	
Curculionidae	"Lepyrus"	†L. evictus (Scudder, 1893)	Lake Gosiute	1 specimen	A Tropiphorini tribe entimine weevil of uncertain genus affiliation.	
Curculionidae	†Limalophus	†L. compositus (Scudder, 1893)	Lake Gosiute; Lake Unita	3 specimens	A Tropiphorini tribe entimine weevil.	
Curculionidae	†Limalophus	†L. contractus (Scudder, 1893)	Lake Gosiute	6 specimens	A Tropiphorini tribe entimine weevil.	
Curculionidae	†Limalophus	†L. receptus (Scudder, 1893)	Lake Unita	1 specimen	A Tropiphorini tribe entimine weevil. First named as Artipus receptus (1893).	
Curculionidae	Listronotus	†L. muratus Scudder, 1890	Lake Gosiute	1 specimen	A Listroderini tribe cyclomine weevil.	
Curculionidae	†Lithogeraeus	†L. anicilla (Scudder, 1893)	Lake Unita	5 specimens	An Apostasimerini tribe conoderine weevil. First described as Aulobaris ancilla (1893)	
Curculionidae	†Lithogeraeus	†L. circumscripta (Scudder, 1893)	Lake Unita	5 specimens	An Apostasimerini tribe conoderine weevil. First described as Aulobaris circumscripta (1893)	
Curculionidae	†Lithogeraeus	†L. comminuta (Scudder, 1893)	Lake Unita	4 specimens	An Apostasimerini tribe conoderine weevil. First described as Aulobaris comminuta (1893)	
Curculionidae	†Lithogeraeus	†L. greenriverensis Legalov, 2018	Lake Uinta		An Apostasimerini tribe conoderine weevil.	
Curculionidae	Mitostylus	†M. abacus (Scudder, 1893)	Lake Unita	1 specimen	A Sciaphilini tribe entimine weevil. First named as Scythropus abacus (1893).	
Curculionidae	Mitostylus	†M. obdurefactus (Scudder, 1893)	Lake Unita	5 specimens	A Sciaphilini tribe entimine weevil. First named as Exomias obdurefactus (1893).	
Curculionidae	Mitostylus	†M. seculorum (Scudder, 1890)	Lake Gosiute	1 specimen	A Sciaphilini tribe entimine weevil. First named as Tanymecus seculorum (1890).	
Curculionidae	Neoptochus	Indeteminate	Lake Unita	2 specimens	Indeterminate Cyphicerini tribe Entiminae weevil fossils.	
Curculionidae	Nicentrus	†N. curvirostris Legalov, 2018	Lake Uinta	1 specimen	An Apostasimerini tribe conoderine weevil.	
Curculionidae	Ophryastes	†"O". compactus Scudder, 1878	Lake Gosiute	1 specimen	A Tropiphorini tribe entimine weevil. of uncertain genus affinities (2011, 2015).	
Curculionidae	Ophryastes	†O. grandis Scudder, 1893	Lake Unita	1 specimen	A Tropiphorini tribe entimine weevil. Considered nomen dubium (2015).	
Curculionidae	Ophryastes	†O. petrarum Scudder, 1893	Lake Unita	2 specimens	A Tropiphorini tribe entimine weevil. Considered nomen dubium (2011, 2015).	
Curculionidae	†Ophryastites	†O. digressus Scudder, 1893	Lake Unita	1 specimen	A weevil of uncertain tribal affiliation.	
Curculionidae	†Ophryastites	†O. dispertitus Scudder, 1893	Lake Unita	1 specimen	A weevil of uncertain tribal affiliation.	
Curculionidae	†Otiorhynchites	†O. commutatus Scudder. 1893	Lake Unita	1 specimen	A weevil of uncertain subfamilial affiliations.	
Curculionidae	†Otiorhynchites	†O. fossilis Scudder. 1893	Fossil Lake	1 specimen	A weevil of uncertain subfamilial affiliations.	
Curculionidae	†Otiorhynchites	†O. tysoni Scudder. 1893	Lake Gosiute; Lake Unita	2 specimens	A weevil of uncertain subfamilial affiliations.	
Curculionidae	Otiorhynchus	†"O". flaccus Scudder, 1893	Lake Gosiute	1 specimen	An Otiorhynchini tribe entimine weevil. Considered genus and subfamily incertae sedis by Legalov (2015).	
Curculionidae	Otiorhynchus	†O. subteractus Scudder, 1893	Lake Unita	1 specimen	An Otiorhynchini tribe entimine weevil. Considered genus incertae sedis by Legalov (2015).	
Curculionidae	Otiorhynchus	†"O". tumbae (Scudder, 1890)	Lake Gosiute	1 specimen	An entimine weevil. Considered genus and tribus incertae sedis by Legalov (2015). First named Otiorhynchus dubius (1878)	
Curculionidae	"Pachylobius"	†"P". compressus Scudder, 1893	Lake Gosiute; Lake Unita	9 specimens	A weevil elytron of uncertain subfamily and genus affiliations.	
Curculionidae	"Pachylobius"	†"P". depraedatus Scudder, 1893	Lake Unita	4 specimens	A weevil elytron of uncertain subfamily and genus affiliations.	
Curculionidae	†Palaeomallerus	†P. longirostris Legalov, 2018	Lake Uinta	1 specimen	A Palaeomallerini tribe conoderine weevil.	
Curculionidae	"Phyllobius"	†"P". antecessor Scudder, 1893	Lake Unita	1 specimen	A weevil of uncertain subfamily and genus affiliations.	
Curculionidae	"Phyllobius"	†"P". avus Scudder, 1893	Lake Gosiute; Lake Unita	3 specimens	A weevil of uncertain subfamily and genus affiliations.	
Curculionidae	"Phyllobius"	†"P". carcerarius Scudder, 1893	Lake Unita	2 specimens	A weevil of uncertain subfamily and genus affiliations.	
Curculionidae	"Polygraphus"	†"P". wortheni (Scudder, 1876)	Lake Gosiute	1 specimen	A scolytine bark beetle. Considered genus and tribus incertae sedis by Legalov (2015)	
Curculionidae	Procas	†P. vinculatus Scudder, 1893	Lake Unita	2 specimens	An Erirhinini tribe erirhinine weevil.	
Curculionidae	†Primocentron	†P. wickhami Legalov, 2018	Lake Uinta	1 specimen	A Eustylini tribe entimine weevil.	
Curculionidae	†Pseudophaops	†P. perditus (Scudder, 1876)	Lake Gosiute	2 specimens	A Eustylini tribe entimine weevil. First named Otiorhynchus perditus (1876)	
Curculionidae	†Pseudophaops	†P. wickhami Legalov, 2018	Lake Uinta		A Tropiphorini tribe entimine weevil.	
Curculionidae	"Rhyssomatus"	†"R". tabescens Scudder, 1893	Lake Unita	1 specimen	A weevil of uncertain generic affiliations.	
Curculionidae	†Sciabregma	†S. rugosa Scudder, 1893	Lake Unita	1 specimen	A Sciabregmini tribe molytine weevil.	
Curculionidae	†Sciabregma	†S. tenuicornis Cockerell, 1921	Lake Unita		A Sciabregmini tribe molytine weevil.	
Curculionidae	†Scythropus	†S. somniculosus Scudder, 1893	Lake Unita	1 specimen	A weevil of uncertain subfamilial affiliations.	
Curculionidae	"Sitona"	†"S". paginarum Scudder, 1893	Lake Gosiute; Lake Unita	4 specimens	A Tropiphorini tribe entimine weevil of uncertain genus affiliations.	
Curculionidae	†Steganus	†S. barrandei Scudder, 1893	Lake Unita	1 specimen	A conoderine weevil.	
Curculionidae	†Syntomostylus	†S. rudis Scudder, 1893	Lake Unita	3 specimens	A weevil of uncertain subfamilial affiliations.	
Curculionidae	"Trypodendron"	†"T". impressus (Scudder, 1876)	Lake Gosiute	4 specimens	A scolytine bark beetle. Considered genus and tribus incertae sedis by Legalov (2015); Jr synonym includes Dryocoetes impressus (1878 in paleontology)	
Erotylidae	Tritoma	†T. binotata Scudder, 1878	Lake Gosiute	1 specimen	A Tritomini tribe erotyline pleasing fungus beetle. First named as Mycotretus binotata (1878)	
Laemophloeidae	Parandrita	†P. vestita Scudder, 1890	Lake Gosiute	4 specimens	A lined flat bark beetle.	
Melandryidae	†Cicindelopsis	†C. eophilus Cockerell, 1921	Lake Unita		A false darkling beetle.	
Mordellidae	†Petrimordella	†P. priscula (Cockerell, 1924)		1 specimen	A tumbling flower beetle morphospecies. First named as Mordella priscula (1925).	
Mordellidae	†Petrimordella	†P. rasnitsyni (Odnosum & Perkovsky, 2016)		1 specimen	A tumbling flower beetle morphospecies. First named as Isotrilophus rasnitsyni (2016).	
Nemonychidae	†Eocaenonemonyx	†E. kuscheli Legalov, 2013	Lake Unita		An Eocaenonemonychini tribe cretonemonychine pine flower weevil.	
Nemonychidae	†"Eugnamptus"	†"E". decemsatus Scudder, 1878	Lake Gosiute	1 specimen	An Eocaenonemonychini tribe cretonemonychine pine flower weevil. In need of redescription per Legalov (2013).	
Nemonychidae	†"Eugnamptus"	†"E". grandaevus (Scudder, 1876)	Lake Gosiute	3 specimens	An Eocaenonemonychini tribe cretonemonychine pine flower weevil. First named as Sitona grandaevus (1876); In need of redescription per Legalov (2013).	
Peltidae	"Phenolia"	†"P." incapax Scudder, 1876	Lake Gosiute	1 specimen	A possible shield beetle in need of redescription. First placed as a Nitidulid sap beetle.	

===== Polyphaga - Scarabaeiformia =====
Family	Genus	Species	Member	Abundance	Notes	Image
Scarabaeidae	Aegialia	†A. rupta Scudder, 1890	Lake Gosiute	1 specimen	An aegialiine scaraboid beetle.	
Scarabaeidae	Phyllophaga	†P. avus (Cockerell), Wickham, 1927	Lake Unita	1 specimen	A melolonthine scaraboid beetle. First described as Melolonthites avus (1921)	

===== Polyphaga - Staphyliniformia =====
Family	Genus	Species	Member	Abundance	Notes	Image
Hydrophilidae	Berosus	†B. sexstriatus Scudder, 1878	Lake Gosiute	1 specimen	A Berosini tribe hydrophiline water scavenger beetle.	
Hydrophilidae	Berosus	†B. tenuis Scudder, 1878	Lake Gosiute	1 specimen	A Berosini tribe hydrophiline water scavenger beetle.	
Hydrophilidae	Enochrus	†E. primaevus (Scudder, 1878)	Lake Gosiute	1 specimen	An enochrine water scavenger beetle. First named as Philhydrus primaevus (1878).	
Hydrophilidae	Hydrobius	†H. confixus Scudder, 1890	Lake Gosiute	1 specimen	A Hydrobiusini tribe hydrophiline water scavenger beetle.	
Hydrophilidae	Hydrobius	†H. decineratus Scudder, 1878	Lake Gosiute	1 specimen	A Hydrobiusini tribe hydrophiline water scavenger beetle.	
Hydrophilidae	Hydrochus	†H. relictus Scudder, 1890	Lake Gosiute	1 specimen	A hydrochine water scavenger beetle.	
Hydrophilidae	Laccobius	†L. elongatus Scudder, 1878	Lake Gosiute	1 specimen	A Laccobiini tribe hydrophiline water scavenger beetle.	
Hydrophilidae	Tropisternus	†T. saxialis Scudder, 1878	Lake Gosiute	1 specimen	A Hydrophilini tribe hydrophiline water scavenger beetle.	
Hydrophilidae	Tropisternus	†T. sculptilis Scudder, 1878	Lake Gosiute	1 specimen	A Hydrophilini tribe hydrophiline water scavenger beetle.	
Staphylinidae	Bledius	†B. adamus Scudder, 1878	Lake Gosiute	1 specimen	A Blediini tribe oxyteline rove beetle.	
Staphylinidae	Bolitogyrus	Undescribed	Lake Unita	1 specimen	A Staphylinini tribe staphylinine rove beetle.	
Staphylinidae	Gyrophaena	†G. saxicola Scudder, 1876	Lake Unita		A Homalotini tribe aleocharine rove beetle.	
Staphylinidae	Homalota	†H. recisa Scudder, 1890	Lake Gosiute	2 specimens	A Homalotini tribe aleocharine rove beetle.	
Staphylinidae	Lathrobium	†L. abscessum Scudder, 1876	Lake Gosiute	7 specimens	A Lathrobiini tribe paederine rove beetle.	
Staphylinidae	Leistotrophus	†L. patriarchicus Scudder, 1876	Lake Unita	1 specimen	A Staphylinini tribe staphylinine rove beetle.	
Staphylinidae	Oxytelus	†O. pristinus Scudder, 1876	Lake Unita	1 specimen	An Oxytelini tribe oxyteline rove beetle.	
Staphylinidae	†Staphylinites	†S. obsoletum Scudder, 1876	Lake Gosiute	1 specimen	A rove beetle of uncertain subfamily affiliations.	

==== Dictyoptera ====
Family	Genus	Species	Member	Abundance	Notes	Image
Alienopteridae	†Chimaeroblattina	†C. brevipes Barna, 2018	Lake Unita		An alienopterid Dictyopteran.	
Alienopteridae	†Grant	†G. viridifluvius Aristov, 2018	Lake Unita		An alienopterid Dictyopteran.	
Blattidae	Periplaneta	†P.? smithiae Barna, Zelagin & Šmídová, 2023	Lake Uinta; Parachute Creek	1	A possible periplanetean blattid cockroach.	
Blaberidae	Diploptera	†D. gemini Barna, 2016	Lake Unita		A Diplopterine beetle cockroache. Placement into Diploptera was questioned by Archibald et al. (2026), who considered the species nomen dubium.	
Blaberidae	Diploptera	†D. savba Šmídová, 2016	Lake Unita		A Diplopterine beetle cockroache.	
Blaberidae	Diploptera	†D. vladimir Vršanský, 2016	Lake Unita		A Diplopterine beetle cockroache.	
Blaberidae	Phoetalia	†P. eocenica Vršanský, Šmídová, & Vidlička, 2026	Lake Unita; Parachute Creek	2	A Diplopterine beetle cockroache.	
Ectobiidae	Cariblattoides	†C. labandeirai Vršanský et al., 2012	Lake Uinta		A Pseudophyllodromiine wood cockroach.	
Ectobiidae	Ectobius	†E. kohlsi Vršanský et al., 2014	Lake Unita		An ectobiine Ectobiid cockroach.	

==== Diptera ====
Family	Genus	Species	Member	Abundance	Notes	Image
Anisopodidae	Mycetobia	†"M." terricola (Scudder, 1878)	Lake Gosiute	1 specimen	A wood gnat. First described as Diadocidia? terricola Considered nomen dubium in (2019)	
Anisopodidae	†Olbiogaster	†O. simplex (Cockerell, 1921)	Lake Unita		An olbiogastrine wood gnat. First described as Eothereva simplex (1921)	
Anisopodidae	Sylvicola	†S. cadaver Scudder, 1890	Lake Gosiute	1 specimen	An anisopodine wood gnat. First named as Asarcomyia cadaver (1890)	
Asilidae	Asilus	†A. palaeolestes Cockerell, 1921	Lake Unita		An Asilini tribe asiline robber fly.	
Asilidae	†Stenocinclis	†S. anomala Scudder, 1878	Lake Gosiute	1 specimen	A dasypogonine robber fly.	
Anthomyiidae	Anthomyia	†"A." winchesteri Cockerell, 1921	Lake Unita		First described as an anthomyiid fly. Deemed nomen dubium without evidence in 1996.	
Bibionidae	Plecia	†P. akerionana Fitzgerald, 1999	Lake Unita (Parachute Creek Member)	1 specimen	A bibonid marchfly. The smallest species from the formation.	
Bibionidae	Plecia	†P. dejecta Scudder, 1890	Lake Gosiute	1 specimen	A bibonid marchfly.	
Bibionidae	Plecia	†P. pealei Scudder, 1890	Fossil Lake (Fossil Butte Member)	Most common insect in Fossil Lake	A bibonid marchfly.	
Bibionidae	Plecia	†P. rhodopterina Cockerell, 1925	Lake Unita		A bibonid marchfly.	
Bibionidae	Plecia	†P. winchesteri Cockerell, 1917	Lake Unita		A bibonid marchfly.	
Bibionidae	Plecia	†P. woodruffi Cockerell, 1916	Lake Unita		A bibonid marchfly.	
Blephariceridae	†Philorites	†P. pallescens Cockerell, 1921	Lake Unita		A net-winged midge of uncertain subfamily affinities.	
Chaoboridae	"Corethra"?	†"C".? exita Scudder, 1877	Lake Unita	1 specimen	A phantom midge of uncertain genus affinities. In need of redescription.	
Chironomidae	Chironomus	†C. depletus Scudder, 1877	Lake Unita	1 specimen	A Chironomini tribe chironomine nonbiting midge.	
Chironomidae	Chironomus	†C. patens Scudder, 1877	Lake Unita	1 specimen	A Chironomini tribe chironomine nonbiting midge.	
Chironomidae	Chironomus	†C. septus Scudder, 1890	Lake Gosiute	1 specimen	A Chironomini tribe chironomine nonbiting midge.	
Chironomidae	Undescribed	Undescribed	Lake Unita	Numerous	undescribed midge larvae.	
Culicidae	Culex	†C. damnatorum Scudder, 1890	Lake Gosiute	3 specimens	A Culicini tribe culicine mosquito.	
Culicidae	Culex	†C. winchesteri Cockerell, 1919	Lake Unita		A Culicini tribe culicine mosquito.	
Cylindrotomidae	Cylindrotoma	†C. veterana Cockerell, 1921	Lake Unita		A cylindrotomine long bodied cranefly.	
Cylindrotomidae	†Cyttaromyia	†C. fenestrata Scudder, 1877	Lake Unita	1 specimen	A cylindrotomine long bodied cranefly species.	
Cylindrotomidae	†Cyttaromyia	†C. freiwaldi Cockerell, 1925	Lake Unita	2 specimens	A cylindrotomine long bodied cranefly species.	
Cylindrotomidae	†Cyttaromyia	†C. fuscula (Cockerell, 1921)	Lake Unita	1 specimen	A cylindrotomine long bodied cranefly species. First described as Asilopsis fusculus (1921).	
Cylindrotomidae	†Cyttaromyia	†C. gelhausi Kania-Kłosok et al., 2021	Lake Unita	3 specimens	A cylindrotomine long bodied cranefly species.	
Cylindrotomidae	†Cyttaromyia	†C. obdurescens Cockerell, 1925	Lake Unita	1 specimen	A cylindrotomine long bodied cranefly species.	
Cylindrotomidae	†Cyttaromyia	†C. reclusa Cockerell, 1924	Lake Unita	1 specimen	A cylindrotomine long bodied cranefly species.	
Dolichopodidae	Dolichopus	indeterminate	Lake Gosiute	1 specimen	An indeterminate dolichopodine long-legged fly.	
Empididae	†Protoedalea	†P. brachystoma Cockerell, 1921	Lake Uinta		A balloon fly of uncertain subfamily affinity.	
Empididae	Rhamphomyia	†R. enena Cockerell, 1921	Lake Unita		An Empidini tribe empidine balloon fly.	
Heleomyzidae	Heteromyza	†H. detecta Scudder, 1877	Lake Unita	1 specimen	A heleomyzine Heleomyzid fly.	
Hippoboscidae	†Eornithoica	†E. grimaldii Nel, Garrouste & Engel, 2023	Fossil Lake (Fossil Butte Member)	1 specimen	A Hippoboscoidea fly Pupipara.	
Keroplatidae	Palaeoplatyura	†P. eocenica Cockerell, 1921	Lake Uinta		An Orfeliini tribe keroplatine predatory fungus gnat.	
Limoniidae	Dicranomyia	†D. primitiva Scudder, 1877	Lake Unita	4 specimens	A limoniine limoniid cranefly.	
Limoniidae	Dicranomyia	†D. rostrata Scudder, 1877	Lake Unita	2 specimens	A limoniine limoniid cranefly. Includes Tipula decrepita (1877).	
Limoniidae	Dicranomyia	†D. stigmosa Scudder, 1877	Lake Unita	6 specimens	A limoniine limoniid cranefly. Includes Tipula tecta (1877).	
Limoniidae	†Pronophlebia	†P. rediviva Scudder, 1877	Lake Unita	1 specimen	A limoniid cranefly of uncertain subfamily placement.	
Limoniidae	Rhabdomastix	†R. scudderi (Cockerell, 1921)	Lake Unita		A chioneine limoniid cranefly. First named as Gonomyia scudderi (1921).	
Mycetophilidae	Anatella	†A. tacita Scudder, 1890	Lake Gosiute	1 specimen	An Exechiini tribe mycetophiline fungus gnat.	
Mycetophilidae	Boletina	†B. paludivaga Scudder, 1890	Lake Gosiute	1 specimen	A gnoristine fungus gnat.	
Mycetophilidae	Boletina	†B. umbratica Scudder, 1890	Lake Gosiute	1 specimen	A gnoristine fungus gnat.	
Mycetophilidae	Gnoriste	†G. dentoni Scudder, 1877	Lake Unita	1 specimen	A gnoristine fungus gnat.	
Mycetophilidae	Leptomorphus	†L. palaeospilus (Cockerell, 1921)	Lake Unita		A sciophiline fungus gnat. First named as Diomonus palaeospilus.	
Mycetophilidae	Mycetophila	†M. occultata Scudder, 1877	Lake Unita	1 specimen	A Mycetophilini tribe Mycetophiline fungus gnat.	
Mycetophilidae	Rymosia	†R. strangulata Scudder, 1890	Lake Gosiute	1 specimen	An Exechiini tribe mycetophiline fungus gnat.	
Mycetophilidae	†Sackenia	†S. arcuata Scudder, 1877	Lake Unita	2 specimens	A Mycetophiline fungus gnat.	
Mycetophilidae	†Sackenia	†S. gibbosa Cockerell, 1907	Lake Gosiute		A Mycetophiline fungus gnat.	
Mycetophilidae	Sciophila	S. hyattii Scudder, 1890	Lake Gosiute	1 specimen	A sciophiline fungus gnat.	
Mycetophilidae	Undescribed	Undescribed	Lake Unita	Numerous	undescribed larvae.	
Mythicomyiidae	"Acrocera"	†A. hirsuta Scudder, 1877	Lake Unita	1 specimen	A mythicomyiid fly of uncertain generic affinities. In need of redescription.	
Mythicomyiidae	Reissa	†R. kohlsi Evenhuis, 2019			A mythicomyiine mythicomyiid fly	
Oestridae	Cuterebra	†C. ascarides (Scudder, 1877)	Lake Unita	Numerous	A cuterebrine bot fly species. First named as Musca ascarides (1877); Moved from Lithohypoderma ascarides (1916)	
Oestridae	Cuterebra	†C. bibosa (Scudder, 1877)	Lake Unita	1 specimen	A cuterebrine bot fly species. First named as Musca bibosa (1877)	
Oestridae	Dermatobia	†D. hydropica (Scudder, 1877)	Lake Unita	3 specimens	A cuterebrine bot fly. First named as Musca hydropica (1877).	
Platypezidae	Callomyia	†C. torporata Scudder, 1890	Lake Gosiute	1 specimen	A flat footed fly.	
Stratiomyidae	†Lithophysa	†L. tumulta Scudder, 1890	Lake Gosiute	1 specimen	A soldier fly.	
Stratiomyidae	Nemotelus	†N. eocenicus Cockerell, 1921	Lake Unita		A soldier fly.	
Stratiomyidae	Odontomyia	Undescribed	Lake Unita	Numerous	undescribed soldier fly larvae.	
Stratiomyidae	Sargus	†S. vetus Cockerell, 1921	Lake Unita		A soldier fly.	
Psychodidae	"Culex"	†"C." proavitus Scudder, 1877	Lake Untia	1 specimen	A psychodid fly in need of redescription. First described as a mosquito (1877).	
Sciaridae	Sciara	S. scopuli Scudder, 1890	Lake Gosiute	1 specimen	A sciarine dark-winged fungus gnat.	
Sciomyzidae	†Sciomyza?	†S.? disjecta Scudder, 1878	Lake Gosiute	Numerous	A Sciomyzini tribe sciomyzine marsh fly.	
Sciomyzidae	†Sciomyza?	†S.? manca Scudder, 1878	Lake Gosiute; Lake Unita	Numerous	A Sciomyzini tribe sciomyzine marsh fly.	
Syrphidae	Asarkina	†A. quadrata (Scudder, 1878)	Lake Gosiute	1 specimen	A Syrphini tribe syrphine hoverfly. First described as Milesia quadrata (1878)	
Syrphidae	Cheilosia	†C. ampla Scudder, 1877	Lake Gosiute	3 specimens	A Rhingiini tribe eristaline hoverfly.	
Syrphidae	Eristalis	†E. lapideus Scudder, 1877	Lake Unita	1 specimen	An Eristalini tribe eristaline hoverfly.	
Syrphidae	Psilota	†P. tabidosa Scudder, 1890	Lake Gossiute	1 specimen	A Merodontini tribe eristaline hoverfly.	
Syrphidae	Syrphus	†S. eocenicus Cockerell, 1925	Lake Uinta		A Syrphini tribe syrphine hoverfly.	
Syrphidae	Syrphus	†S. lithaphidis Cockerell, 1921	Lake Unita		A Syrphini tribe syrphine hoverfly.	
Syrphidae	Undescribed	Undescribed	Lake Unita	Numerous	undescribed hoverfly larvae.	
Tabanidae	Undescribed	Undescribed	Lake Unita	Numerous	undescribed larvae.	
Tachinidae	Tachina	indeterminate	Lake Gosiute	1 specimen	A Tachinini tribe tachinine Tachinid fly.	
Tipulidae	†Spiladomyia	†S. simplex (Scudder, 1877)	Lake Unita	1 specimen	A tipulid cranefly of uncertain subfamily affinities.	
Tipulidae	Tipula	†T. americana Kania et al., 2018	Lake Unita	1 specimen	A tipuline tipulid cranefly.	
Tipulidae	Tipula	†T. sepulchri Scudder, 1890	Lake Gosiute	1 specimen	A tipuline tipulid cranefly.	
Tipulidae	Tipula	†T. spoliata Scudder, 1890	Lake Gosiute	3 specimens	A tipuline tipulid cranefly.	
Incertae sedis	†Acanthomyites	†A. aldrichi Cockerell, 1921	Lake Unita		A brachyceran fly of uncertain family affinities. First treated as a house fly.	
Incertae sedis	"Lasioptera"	†"L". recessa Scudder, 1877	Lake Unita	1 specimen	A sciaroid midge of uncertain genus or family affiliation. First placed as a gall midge.	
Incertae sedis	†Lithomyza	†L. condita Scudder, 1877	Lake Unita	1 specimen	A sciaroid midge of uncertain family affiliation. First placed as a gall midge.	
Incertae sedis	†Poliomyia	†P. recta Scudder, 1878	Lake Gosiute	1 specimen	A schizophoran fly of uncertain affinities.	
Incertae sedis	†Vinculomusca	†V. vinculata (Scudder, 1877)	Lake Unita	"Several"	A fly pupal case morphospecies of uncertain affinity. First named as Musca vinculata (1877)	

==== Hemiptera ====
Family	Genus	Species	Member	Abundance	Notes	Image
Aphididae	†?Siphonophoroides	†?S. antiqua Buckton, 1883	Lake Gosiute	1 specimen	A possible drepanosiphine aphid. First identified as possibly Lithaphis diruta (1890)	
Cercopidae	Cercopis	†C. astricta Scudder, 1890	Lake Gosiute	1 specimen	A Cercopini tribe cercopine froghopper.	
Cercopidae	Cercopis	†C. cephalinus Cockerell, 1921	Lake Unita		A Cercopini tribe cercopine froghopper.	
Cercopidae	†Cercopites	†C. calliscens scudder, 1890	Lake Gosiute	1 specimen	A froghopper of uncertain subfamilial affiliation.	
Cercopidae	†Cercopites	†C. umbratilis scudder, 1890	Lake Gosiute	1 specimen	A froghopper of uncertain subfamilial affiliation.	
Cercopidae	†Palecphora	†P. patefacta Scudder, 1890	Lake Gosiute	1 specimen	A froghopper of uncertain subfamilial affiliation.	
Cicadellidae	Aphrodes	†A. adae (SCudder, 1878)	Lake Gosiute	2 specimens	An Aphrodini tribe aphrodine leafhopper. First named as Acocephalus adae (1878).	
Cicadellidae	Cicadella	†C. parobtecta Dmitriev, 2020	Lake Unita	1 specimen	A Cicadellini tribe cicadelline leafhopper. A replacement name for Tettigonia obtecta (1877 non-Fabricius, 1803)	
Cicadellidae	Cicadella	†C. priscomarginata (Scudder, 1890)	Lake Gosiute	1 specimen	A Cicadellini tribe cicadelline leafhopper. First named as Tettigonia priscomarginata (1890).	
Cicadellidae	Cicadella	†C. priscovariegata Scudder, 1890	Lake Gosiute	1 specimen	A Cicadellini tribe cicadelline leafhopper. First named as Tettigonia priscovariegata (1890).	
Cicadellidae	Cicadella	†C. scudderi Cockerell, 1921	Lake Unita		A Cicadellini tribe cicadelline leafhopper.	
Cicadellidae	Cicadula	†C. saxosa Scudder, 1890	Lake Gosiute	1 specimen	A Cicadulini tribe deltocephaline leafhopper.	
Cicadellidae	Coelidia	†C. wyomingensis Scudder, 1890	Fossil Lake (Fossil Butte Member)	1 specimen	A Coelidiini tribe coelidiine leafhopper.	
Cicadellidae	Iassus	†I. lapidescens (Scudder, 1877)	Lake Uinta	1 specimen	An Iassini tribe iassine leafhopper. First named as Bythoscopus lapidescens (1877)	
Cicadellidae	Thamnotettix	†T. gannetti Scudder, 1890	Lake Gosiute	2 specimens	An Athysanini tribe deltocephaline leafhopper.	
Cicadellidae	Thamnotettix	†T. mutilata Scudder, 1890	Lake Gosiute	1 specimen	An Athysanini tribe deltocephaline leafhopper.	
Cicadellidae	Thamnotettix	†T. packardi Cockerell, 1925	Lake Unita	2 specimens	An Athysanini tribe deltocephaline leafhopper.	
Cixiidae	Cixius	†C.? hesperidum Scudder, 1878	Lake Gosiute	1 specimen	A possible Cixiini tribe cixiine cixiid planthopper. Considered nomen dubium by Swedo and Lefebvre (2004).	
Cixiidae	†Oliarites	†O. terrentula (Scudder, 1878)	Lake Gosiute	1 specimen	A cixiine cixiid planthopper. First named as Mnemosyne terrentula (1878); Considered nomen dubium by Swedo and Lefebvre (2004).	
Cydnidae	Cyrtomenus	†C. concinnus Scudder, 1878	Lake Gosiute	1 specimen	A Geotomini tribe cydnine burrowing bug.	
Cydnidae	†Necrocydnus	†N. gosiutensis Scudder, 1890	Lake Gosiute	1 specimen	A burrowing bug of uncertain subfamilial affiliation.	
Cydnidae	†Procydnus	†P. mamillanus (Scudder, 1878)	Lake Gosiute	1 specimen	A cydnine burrowing bug. First named as Cydnus? mamillanus (1878).	
Cydnidae	†Stenopelta	↑S. punctulata (Scudder, 1878)	Lake Gosiute	5 specimens	A cydnine burrowing bug. First named as Aethus punctulatus (1878).	
Delphacidae	Delphax	†D. veterum Cockerell, 1921	Lake Uinta		A Delphacini tribe delphacine delphacid froghopper	
Dinidoridae	†Dinidorites	†D. margiformis Cockerell, 1921	Lake Unita		A dinidorid shield bug of uncertain subfamily affinities.	
Fulgoridae	Aphaena	†A. atava Scudder, 1877	Lake Unita	1 specimen	A lanternfly of uncertain subfamily affiliations First named as Aphana atava (1877)	
Fulgoridae	Aphaena	†A. rotundipennis Scudder, 1878	Lake Gosiute	2 specimens	A lanternfly of uncertain subfamily affiliations First named as Aphana rotundipennis (1878)	
Fulgoridae	Fulgora	†F. granulosa Scudder, 1878	Lake Gosiute	1 specimen	A Fulgorini tribe fulgorine lanternfly.	
Fulgoridae	Fulgora	†F. populata Scudder, 1890	Lake Gosiute	1 specimen	A Fulgorini tribe fulgorine lanternfly.	
Fulgoridae	Lystra?	†L.? leei Scudder, 1878	Lake Gosiute	1 specimen	A Lystrini tribe poiocerine lanternfly.	
Fulgoridae	Lystra?	†L.? richardsoni Scudder, 1878	Lake Gosiute	11 specimens	A Lystrini tribe poiocerine lanternfly.	
Gerridae	†Telmatrechus	†T. parallelus Scudder, 1890	Fossil Lake (Fossil Butte Member); Lake Uinta (Laney Member)	2 specimens	A water strider.	
Lophopidae	†Scoparidea	†S. nebulosa Cockerell, 1921	Lake Unita		A lophopid planthopper.	
Lyctocoridae	Lyctocoris	†L. terreus (Scudder, 1878)	Lake Gosiute	1 specimen	A Lyctocorini tribe lyctocorine Lyctocorid bug. First named as Rhyparochromus? terreus (1878)	
Nogodinidae	†Detyopsis	†D. scudderi Cockerell, 1921	Lake Unita		A nogodinid planthopper.	
Nogodinidae	†Detyopsis	†D. scudderi Cockerell, 1921	Lake Unita		A nogodinid planthopper.	
Nogodinidae	†Ficarasites	†F. stigmaticum Scudder, 1890	Lake Gosiute	1 specimen	A nogodinid planthopper.	
Nogodinidae	†Lithopsis	†L. delicata Cockerell, 1921	Lake Unita		A nogodinid planthopper.	
Nogodinidae	†Lithopsis	†L. elongata Scudder, 1890	Lake Gosiute	1 specimen	A nogodinid planthopper.	
Nogodinidae	†Lithopsis	†L. fimbriata Scudder, 1878	Lake Gosiute	3 specimens	A nogodinid planthopper.	
Nogodinidae	†Lithopsis	†L. simillima Cockerell, 1921	Lake Unita		A nogodinid planthopper.	
Nogodinidae	"Paralatindia"	†"P." saussurei Scudder, 1890	Lake Gosiute	1 specimen	A nogodinid planthopper. First described as a Paralatindia genus cockroach. Considered nomen dubium by Shcherbakov (2006)	
Reduviidae	†Aphelicophontes	†A. danjuddi Swanson et al., 2021	Lake Unita	1 specimen	A Harpactorini tribe Harpactorine Assassin bug.	
Rhopalidae	Corizus	†C. guttatus (Scudder, 1878)	Lake Gosiute	2 specimens	A Rhopalini tribe rhopaline scentless plant bug. First named as Reduvius guttatus (1878).	
Rhyparochromidae	Aphanus	†A. petrensis Scudder, 1877	Lake Unita	1 specimen	A Gonianotini tribe rhyparochromine seed bug. First named as Pachymerus petrensis (1877).	
Rhyparochromidae	Cholula	†C. triguttata Scudder, 1890	Lake Gosiute	1 specimen	A Myodochini tribe rhyparochromine seed bug.	
Ricaniidae	†Dilaropsis	†D. ornatus Cockerell, 1921	Lake Unita		A Ricaniid plant hopper.	
Ricaniidae	†Hammapteryx	†H.? ceryniiformis Cockerell, 1921	Lake Unita		A Ricaniid plant hopper.	
Ricaniidae	†Hammapteryx	†H.? lepidoides Cockerell, 1921	Lake Unita		A Ricaniid plant hopper.	
Ricaniidae	†Hammapteryx	†H. reticulata Scudder, 1890	Lake Gosiute	1 specimen	A Ricaniid plant hopper.	
Tingidae	†Gyaclavator	†G. kohlsi Wappler et al., 2015	Lake Unita	4 specimens	A lace bug of uncertain subfamily affiliation.	
Incertae sedis	"Delphax"	†"D." senilis Scudder, 1877	Lake Unita	1 specimen	First described as a delphacine froghopper. Considered nomen dubium	
Incertae sedis	†Diaplegma	†D. obdormitum Scudder, 1890	Lake Gosiute	1 specimen	A fulgoroid leafhopper of uncertain familial affinities. First placed as a cixiid planthopper.	
Incertae sedis	Emiliana	†E. alexandri Shcherbakov, 2006	Lake Unita	1 specimen	A fulgoroid leafhopper of uncertain familial affinities. First placed as a Tropiduchid froghopper	
Incertae sedis	†Eoliarus	†E. lutensis (Scudder, 1890)	Lake Gosiute	1 specimen	A fulgoroid leafhopper of uncertain familial affinities. First described as Oliarus lutensis (1890)	
Incertae sedis	†Eoliarus	†E. quadristictus Cockerell, 1925	Lake Unita	1 specimen	A fulgoroid leafhopper of uncertain familial affinities.	
Incertae sedis	†Necygonus	†N. rotundatus Scudder, 1890	Lake Gosiute	1 specimen	A Pentatomomorph shield bug of uncertain familial affiliation. First placed as a toad bug genus.	
Incertae sedis	†Protoliarus	†P. humatus Cockerell, 1921	Lake Uinta		A fulgoroid leafhopper of uncertain familial affinities. First described as a lanternfly.	

==== Hymenoptera ====
Family	Genus	Species	Member	Abundance	Notes	Image
Apidae	†Euglossopteryx	†E. biesmeijeri De Meulemeester, Michez & Engel, 2014	Lake Unita (Parachute Creek Member)		An apid bee.	
Bethylidae	Eupsenella	E. sp.			An old world Bethylidae wasp.	
Braconidae	Bracon	†B. laminarum Scudder, 1878	Lake Gosiute	1 specimen	A Braconini tribe braconine braconid wasp.	
Braconidae	†Colemanus	†C. keeleyorum Fisher, 2015	Lake Unita (Parachute Creek Member)	1 specimen	A Proteropini tribe ichneutine braconid wasp.	
Braconidae	†Eobracon	†E. cladurus Cockerell, 1921	Lake Unita		A braconid wasp of uncertain subfamily affinities.	
Braconidae	Spathius	†S. petrinus (Scudder, 1877)	Lake Unita	1 specimen	A Spathiini tribe Doryctine braconid wasp. First named as Ichneumon petrinus (1877); Moved from Hormiopterus petrinus (1910)	
Eurytomidae	Eurytoma	†E. antiqua (Scudder, 1878)	Lake Gosiute	2 specimens	A eurytomine Eurytomid chalcid wasp. First described as Decatoma antiqua (1878).	
Formicidae	†Archimyrmex	†A. rostratus Cockerell, 1923	Lake Unita	Numerous	A myrmeciine ant.	
Formicidae	†Camponotites	†C. vetus (Scudder, 1877)	Green River Formation?	1 specimen	A formicine ant of uncertain affiliation. First described as Camponotus vetus (1877); The type locality was not specified by Scudder, and may Be G.R.F. or White River Formation.	
Formicidae	Dolichoderus	†D. kohlsi Dlussky & Rasnitsyn, 2003	Lake Uinta	Numerous	A Dolichoderus species ant.	
Formicidae	†Eoformica	†E. globularis Dlussky & Rasnitsyn, 2003	Lake Unita	2 specimens	An ant of unidentified affiliation.	
Formicidae	†Eoformica	†E. magna Dlussky & Rasnitsyn, 2003	Lake Unita	1 specimen	An ant of unidentified affiliation.	
Formicidae	†Eoformica	†E. pinguis (Scudder, 1877)	Lake Gosiute; Lake Uinta	Numerous	An ant of unidentified affiliation. Moved from Liometopum pingue (1877); Includes the jr synonyms Lasius terreus (1878) and Eoformica eocenica (1921)	
Formicidae	†Eoformica	Indeterminate	Lake Unita	2 specimen	Two partial specimens that may be referable to Eoformica.	
Formicidae	†Kohlsimyrma	†K. gracilis Dlussky & Rasnitsyn, 2003	Lake Unita	2 specimens	An ant of uncertain affiliation.	
Formicidae	†Kohlsimyrma	†K. laticeps Dlussky & Rasnitsyn, 2003	Lake Unita	1 specimen	An ant of uncertain affiliation.	
Formicidae	†Kohlsimyrma	†K. longiceps Dlussky & Rasnitsyn, 2003	Lake Unita	3 specimens	An ant of uncertain affiliation.	
Formicidae	†Mianeuretus	†M. eocenicus Dlussky & Rasnitsyn, 2003	Lake Unita	2 specimens	An aneuretine ant.	
Formicidae	†Mianeuretus	Indeterminate	Lake Unita	1 specimen	A partial specimen that may belong to Mianeuretus.	
Formicidae	†Myrmecites	†M. rotundiceps Dlussky & Rasnitsyn, 2003	Lake Unita	1 specimen	A myrmicine ant of uncertain affiliation.	
Formicidae	Pachycondyla	†P. labandeirai Dlussky & Rasnitsyn, 2003	Lake Gosiute	1 specimen	A Pachycondyla species ant.	
Formicidae	†Ponerites	†P. coloradensis Dlussky & Rasnitsyn, 2003	Lake Unita	1 specimen	A ponerine ant of uncertain affiliation.	
Formicidae	†Ponerites	†P. eocenicus Dlussky & Rasnitsyn, 2003	Lake Unita	1 specimen	A ponerine ant of uncertain affiliation.	
Formicidae	†Ponerites	†P. hypoponeroides Dlussky & Rasnitsyn, 2003	Lake Unita	1 specimen	A ponerine ant of uncertain affiliation.	
Formicidae	†Proiridomyrmex	†P. vetulus Dlussky & Rasnitsyn, 2003	Lake Unita	1 specimen	A dolichoderine of uncertain affinity.	
Formicidae	†Proiridomyrmex	Indeterminate	Lake Unita	1 specimen	A partial specimen that may belong to Proiridomyrmex.	
Formicidae	†Solenopsites	†S. minutus Dlussky & Rasnitsyn, 2003	Lake Unita	1 specimen	A Solenopsis like ant of uncertain affiliation.	
Formicidae	†Titanomyrma	†T. lubei Archibald et al., 2011	Fossil Lake (Angelo Member)	3 specimens	A titan ant species.	
Formicidae	Indeterminate	Indeterminate	Lake Unita	1 specimen	A partial ant specimen that may belong to Formica.	
Formicidae	Indeterminate	Indeterminate	Lake Unita	3 specimens	Partial ant specimens of unidentified subfamily placement.	
Ichneumonidae	Allomacrus	†A. lanhami (Cockerell, 1941)	Lake Unita		A cylloceriine darwin wasp. First named as Plectiscidea lanhami (1941)	
Ichneumonidae	†Carinibus	†C. molestus Spasojevic et al., 2018	Lake Unita	1 specimen	A darwin wasp of uncertain subfamily placement.	
Ichneumonidae	Eclytus?	†E.? lutatus Scudder, 1890	Lake Gosiute	1 specimen	A possible Eclytini tribe tryphonine darwin wasp.	
Ichneumonidae	†Eopimpla	†E. grandis Cockerell, 1921	Lake Unita		A darwin wasp of uncertain subfamily placement.	
Ichneumonidae	Glypta?	†G.? transversalis Scudder, 1890	Lake Gosiute?	1 specimen	A Glyptini tribe banchine darwin wasp.	
Ichneumonidae	†Ichninsum	†I. appendicrassum Spasojevic et al., 2018	Lake Unita	1 specimen	A pimpline darwin wasp.	
Ichneumonidae	†Lithotorus	†L. cressoni Scudder, 1890	Lake Gosiute	1 specimen	An Orthocentrine darwin wasp.	
Ichneumonidae	Mesoclistus?	†M.? yamataroti Spasojevic et al., 2018	Lake Unita	1 specimen	A possible Coleocentrini tribe acaenitine darwin wasp.	
Ichneumonidae	Pimpla?	†P.? eocenica Cockerell, 1919	Lake Unita	1 specimen	A possible Pimplini tribe pimpline darwin wasp.	
Ichneumonidae	Phygadeuon	†P. petrifactellus Cockerell, 1921	Lake Uinta		A Phygadeuontini tribe phygadeuontine darwin wasp.	
Ichneumonidae	Rhyssa?	†R.? juvenis Scudder, 1890	Lake Gosiute	1 specimen	A Rhyssini tribe rhyssine darwin wasp.	
Ichneumonidae	Scambus?	†S.? mandibularis Spasojevic et al., 2018	Lake Unita	1 specimen	A possible Ephialtini tribe pimpline darwin wasp.	
Ichneumonidae	Scambus?	†S.? parachuti Spasojevic et al., 2018	Lake Unita	1 specimen	A possible Ephialtini tribe pimpline darwin wasp.	
Ichneumonidae	†Tilgidopsis	†T. haesitans Cockerell, 1921	Lake Unita		A darwin wasp of uncertain subfamily placement.	
Ichneumonidae	†Trymectus	†T. amasidis (Cockerell & LeVeque, 1931)	lake Unita		A darwin wasp of uncertain subfamily placement. First described as Tryphon amasidis (1931)	
Siricidae	†Eoteredon	†E. lacoi Archibald, Aase & Nel, 2021	Fossil Lake	1 specimen	A siricid Horntail wood-wasp.	
Tenthredinidae	Eutomostethus	†E. karimae Nel, Niu & Wei, 2022	Lake Unita		A blennocampine common sawfly.	
Tenthredinidae	Taxonus	†T. nortoni Scudder, 1890	Lake Gosiute	1 specimen	An allantine common sawfly.	
Vespidae	Alastor	†A. solidescens (Scudder, 1890)	Lake Gosiute	1 specimen	A eumenine potter wasp. First named as Didineis solidescens (1890).	
Xyelidae	†Proxyelia	†P. pankowskii Jouault, Aase & Nel, 2021	Fossil Lake	1 specimen	A xyelid sawfly	

==== Lepidoptera ====
Family	Genus	Species	Member	Abundance	Notes	Image
Depressariidae	†Hexerites	†H. primalis Cockerell, 1933	Lake Unita	1 specimen	A stenomatine depressariid moth. First placed in the family Thyrididae.	

==== Mantodea ====
Family	Genus	Species	Member	Abundance	Notes	Image
Indeterminate	Indeterminate	Indeterminate			Undescribed preying mantis specimens	

==== Megaloptera ====
Family	Genus	Species	Member	Abundance	Notes	Image
Sialidae	Indeterminate	Indeterminate		1 specimen	A probable alderfly larvae	

==== Neuroptera ====
Family	Genus	Species	Member	Abundance	Notes	Image
Berothidae	†Xenoberotha	†X. angustialata Makarkin, 2017	Lake Unita (Parachute Creek Member)	1 specimen	A berothine beaded lacewing.	
Hemerobiidae	Megalomus?	†M.? coloradensis Makarkin, 2024	Lake Unita		A possible Megalomus brown lacewing.	
Hemerobiidae	†Pseudonotherobius	†P. kohlsi Makarkin, 2024	Lake Unita		A brown lacewing.	
Mantispidae	†Protonolima	†P. mantispinoformis Makarkin, 2019	Lake Unita	1 specimen	A calomantispine mantidfly.	
Myrmeleontidae	†Epignopholeon	†E. sophiae Makarkin, 2017	Lake Unita (Parachute Creek Member)	1 specimen	A probable Gnopholeontini tribe myrmeleontine antlion.	
Myrmeleontidae	†Protopalpares	†P. lindgrenae Makarkin & Archibald, 2026	Fossil Lake (Fossil Butte Member)	1 specimen	A palparine antlion.	
Osmylidae	†Nuddsia	†Nuddsia? jessicae Makarkin & Mock, 2026			A gumilline Osmylid lance lacewing	
Osmylidae	†Osmylidia	†O. taliae Makarkin, Archibald, & Mathewes, 2021	Lake Unita	1 specimen	A protosmyline Osmylid lance lacewing	
Incertae sedis	†Callospilopteron	†C. ocellatum Cockerell, 1921			A lacewing of uncertain affiliation. First identified as a hemipteran planthopper.	

==== Raphidioptera ====
Family	Genus	Species	Member	Abundance	Notes	Image
Raphidiidae	†Archiinocellia	†A. protomaculata (Engel, 2011)	Lake Unita (Parachute Creek Member)	ca. 18 specimens	A raphidiid snakefly. Moved from Agulla protomaculata (2011)	

==== Odonata ====
Primarily based on Bechly et al (2020):

Family	Genus	Species	Member	Abundance	Notes	Image
Amphipterygidae	†Protamphipteryx	P. basalis Cockerell, 1921	Fossil Lake		An amphipterygine amphipterygid damselfly.	
†Carleidae	†Carlea	C. eocenica Bechly et al., 2020	Fossil Lake	1 specimen	A carleid damselfly.	
Cordulibellulidae	†Cordulibellula	C. inopinata Sroka, Howells & Nel, 2023	Lake Uinta (Parachute Creek)		A cordulibellulid dragonfly the last member of an ancient lineage.	
Corduliidae	†Stenogomphus	†S. carletoni Scudder, 1892	Lake Unita		A green-eyed skimmer.	
Corduliidae	†Stenogomphus	†"S." scudderi Cockerell, 1921	Lake Unita		First described as a green-eyed skimmer. Deemed nomen dubium in 1994.	
Dysagrionidae	†Dysagrion	D. fredericii Scudder, 1878	Lake Gosiute (Laney Member)	16 specimens	A dysagrionine dysagrionid damselfly.	
Dysagrionidae	†Dysagrion	D. integrum Bechly et al., 2020	Fossil Lake (Fossil Butte Member)	1 specimen	A dysagrionine dysagrionid damselfly.	
Dysagrionidae	†Dysagrion	D. lakesii Scudder, 1890	Lake Gosiute (Laney Member)	1 specimen	A dysagrionine dysagrionid damselfly.	
Dysagrionidae	†Dysagrion	D. packardii Scudder, 1885	Lake Gosiute (Laney Member)	1 specimen	A dysagrionine dysagrionid damselfly.	
Dysagrionidae	†Petrolestes	†P. hendersoni Cockerell, 1927	Lake Uinta (Parachute Creek Member)	1 specimen	A petrolestine dysagrionid damselfly.	
Dysagrionidae	†Petrolestes	†P. inexpectatus Nel, 2024	Lake Uinta	1 specimen	A petrolestine dysagrionid damselfly.	
Dysagrionidae	†Tenebragrion	†T. tynskyi Nel, Palazzo & Aase, 2023	Fossil Lake		A dysagrionid damselfly.	
Dysagrionidae	†Tenebragrion	†T. shermani Bechly et al., 2020	Fossil Lake		A dysagrionid damselfly.	
Calopterygidae	†Eocalopteryx	E. atavina Cockerell, 1920	Lake Gosiute	1 specimen	A calopterygid damsefly.	
Euphaeidae	†Eodysphaea	E. magnifica Bechly et al., 2020	Lake Uinta (Parachute Creek)		A euphaeid damselfly.	
Euphaeidae	†Epallagites	E. avus Cockerell, 1925	Lake Unita	1 specimen	A euphaeid damselfly.	
Euphaeidae	†Labandeiraia	L. americaborealis Petrulevičius et al., 2007	Lake Uinta (Parachute Creek)	1 specimen	A euphaeid damselfly.	
Euphaeidae	†Labandeiraia	L. riveri Bechly et al., 2020	Fossil Lake	1 specimen	A euphaeid damselfly.	
Euphaeidae	†Litheuphaea	L. coloradensis Petrulevičius et al., 2007	Lake Uinta (Parachute Creek)	1 specimen	A euphaeid damselfly.	
†Eolestidae	†Eolestes	E. syntheticus Cockerell, 1940	Lake Unita		An eolestid damselfly.	
Megapodagrionidae	†Viridiflumineagrion	V. aasei Nel, 2022	Lake Uinta (Parachute Creek Member)	1 specimen	A "megapodagrionid" damselfly.	
Thaumatoneuridae	†Gusagrion	†G. coloratum Nel, 2024	Lake Uinta	1 specimen	An eodysagrionine thaumatoneurid damselfly.	
Thaumatoneuridae	†Oreodysagrion	O. tenebris Bechly et al., 2020	Fossil Lake		A thaumatoneurid damselfly.	
Thaumatoneuridae	†Tynskysagrion	T. brookeae Bechly et al., 2020	Fossil Lake		A thaumatoneurid damselfly.	
†Urolibellulidae	†Kohlslibellula	K. lini Nel, 2020	Lake Uinta (Parachute Creek)		A urolibellulid dragonfly	
†Urolibellulidae	†Urolibellula	U. eocaenica Zeiri et al., 2015	Lake Uinta (Parachute Creek)		A urolibellulid dragonfly	
Zacallitidae	†Zacallites	Z. balli Cockerell, 1928			A zacallitid damselfly.	
Zacallitidae	†Zacallites	Z. cockerelli Bechly et al., 2020	Fossil Lake		A zacallitid damselfly.	
incertae sedis	†Eopodagrion	"E." abortivum (Scudder, 1878)	Lake Gosiute (Laney Member)	1 specimen	A damselfly of uncertain affinities. First named as Podagrion abortivum (1878); Deemed nomen dubium by Nel (2022).	
incertae sedis	†Eopodagrion	E. scudderi Cockerell, 1921	Lake Gosiute (Laney Member)	3 specimens	A damselfly of uncertain affinities.	

==== Orthoptera ====
Family	Genus	Species	Member	Abundance	Notes	Image
Eumastacidae	†Eoerianthus	†E. eocaenicus Gorochov, 2012	Lake Unita		A monkey grasshopper.	
Eumastacidae	†Eoerianthus	†E. multispinosus (Scudder, 1890	Lake Gosiute		A monkey grasshopper. First described as Tyrbula multispinosa (1890).	
Gryllidae	Eogryllus	†E. unicolor Gorochov, 2012	Lake Unita		A Gryllini tribe grylline true cricket.	
Gryllidae	Eogryllus	†E. elongatus Gorochov, 2012	Lake Unita		A Gryllini tribe grylline true cricket. Tentatively placed in Eogryllus	
Gryllidae	†Pronemobius	†P. induratus Scudder, 1890	Lake Gosiute		A Gryllini tribe grylline true cricket.	
Gryllidae	†Pronemobius	†P. ornatipes Cockerell, 1921	Lake Unita		A Gryllini tribe grylline true cricket.	
Gryllidae	†Pronemobius	†P. tertiarius (Scudder, 1878)	Lake Gosiute; Lake Unita		A Gryllini tribe grylline true cricket. Tentatively placed in Pronemobius; First described as Nemobius tertiarius (1878).	
Gryllotalpidae	†Pterotriamescaptor?	†P.? americanus Gorochov, 2012	Lake Unita		A gryllotalpine mole cricket.	
Mogoplistidae	†Eomogoplistes	†E. longipennis Gorochov, 2012	Lake Unita		A Mogoplistini tribe Mogoplistine scaly cricket.	
Mogoplistidae	†Pteromogoplistes	†P. grandis Gorochov, 2012	Lake Unita		A Mogoplistini tribe Mogoplistine scaly cricket.	
Mogoplistidae	†Pteromogoplistes	Indeterminate	Lake Unita	numerous	Indeterminate scaly cricket fossils.	
Mogoplistidae	†Pteromogoplistes	†P.? smithii (Scudder, 1890)	Lake Unita		A Mogoplistini tribe Mogoplistine scaly cricket. Tentatively moved from Pronemobius smithii (1890)	
Phalangopsidae	Eotrella	†E. mira Gorochov, 2012	Lake Unita		A phalangopsine spider cricket.	
Phalangopsidae	Eozacla	†E. arachnomorpha Gorochov, 2012	Lake Unita		A phalangopsine spider cricket.	
Phalangopsidae	Eozacla	†E. problematica Gorochov, 2012	Lake Unita		A phalangopsine spider cricket.	
Tetrigidae	Eotetrix	†E. unicornis Gorochov, 2012	Lake Unita		A batrachideine pygmy grasshopper.	
Tettigoniidae	Arethaea	†A. solterae Heads, Thomas & Hedlund, 2023	Lake Uinta (Parachute Creek)	1 specimen	A roundhead katydid.	
Trigonidiidae	Indeterminate	Indeterminate	Lake Unita		Indetermiante trigonidiine sword-tail cricket remains.	
Incertae sedis	†Tettoraptor	†T. maculatus Gorochov, 2012	Lake Unita		A Tettigoniid grasshopper of uncertain affiliations.	

==== Psocodea ====
Family	Genus	Species	Member	Abundance	Notes	Image
Incertae sedis	†Paropsocus	†P. disjunctus Scudder, 1890	Lake Unita	1 specimen	A louse of uncertain family affinities.	

==== Strepsiptera ====
Family	Genus	Species	Member	Abundance	Notes	Image
Myrmecolacidae	Caenocholax	†C. barkleyi Antell & Kathirithamby, 2016	Lake Unita (Parachute Creek Member)	1 specimen	A male twisted-winged insect.	
Myrmecolacidae	Caenocholax	†C. palusaxus Antell & Kathirithamby, 2016	Lake Unita (Parachute Creek Member)	1 specimen	A male twisted-winged insect.	

==== Thysanoptera ====
Family	Genus	Species	Member	Abundance	Notes	Image
Aeolothripidae	†Lithadothrips	†L. vetustus Scudder, 1875	Lake Uinta	2 specimens	An Aeolothripid thrips. First named as Lithadothrips vetusta	
Aeolothripidae	†Palaeothrips	†P. fossilis Scudder, 1867	Lake Unita	1 specimen	An Aeolothripid thrips.	
Melanthripidae	Melanothrips	†M. extincta Scudder, 1875	Lake Unita	1 specimen	A melanthripid thrips.	

==== Trichoptera ====
Family	Genus	Species	Member	Abundance	Notes	Image
Hydropsychidae	Hydropsyche	†H. operta (Scudder, 1877)	Lake Unita	1 specimen	A hydropsychine net-spinning caddisfly. First named as Phryganea operta (1877)	
Hydroptilidae	Hydroptila	†H. phileos Cockerell, 1921	Lake Unita		A Hydroptilini tribe hydroptiline purse-case caddisfly.	
Limnephilidae	†Indusia	†I. calculosa Scudder, 1878	Lake Gosiute?		A northern caddisfly larval case morphospecies.	
Limnephilidae	Limnephilus	†L. eocenicus Cockerell, 1921	Lake Unita	1 specimen	A northern caddisfly species.	
Incertae sedis	†Litholimnephilops	†L. yinani Robinson, Thomas & Heads, 2018	Lake Unita		A caddis fly of uncertain affiliations.	

== Mollusks ==
Based on Grande (1984):

=== Bivalvia ===
Family	Genus	Species	Member	Abundance	Notes	Image
Sphaeriidae	Sphaerium	S. sp.	Lake Gosiute		A fingernail clam.	S. rhomboideum, a modern species
Unionidae	Plesielliptio	P. priscus	Lake Gosiute		A unionid river mussel.	
Unionidae	Plesielliptio	P. sp. "A"	Lake Gosiute		A unionid river mussel.	

=== Gastropoda ===
Family	Genus	Species	Member	Abundance	Notes	Image
Bulimulidae	Oreoconus	O. sp.	?		An undescribed bulimulid land snail.	
Gastrocoptidae	Gastrocopta	G. sp.			An undescribed gastrocoptid land snail.	
Hydrobiidae	Hydrobia	†H. aff. utahensis C. A. White, 1876	Lake Gosiute (Laney, Tipton Shale, Wilkins Peak)		An undescribed mud snail. Affiliated to Hydrobia utahensis	
Hydrobiidae	Hydrobia	H. sp.	Lake Gosiute (Tipton Shale)		An undescribed mud snail.	
Lymnaeidae	Lymnaea	L. similis Meek, 1860	Lake Gosiute (Laney)		A pond snail.	
Lymnaeidae	Lymnaea	L. sp.	Lake Gosiute (Tipton Shale)		An undescribed pond snail.	
Lymnaeidae	†Pleurolimnaea	P. tenuicosta (Meek & Hayden, 1856)	Lake Gosiute (Tipton Shale?)		A pond snail. First named Limnaea tenuicosta (1856)	
Planorbidae	Biomphalaria	B. aequalis (C. A. White, 1880)	Lake Gosiute (Laney, Tipton Shale)		A ramshorn snail.	
Planorbidae	Biomphalaria	B. storchi (L. S. Russell, 1931)	Lake Gosiute (Laney?, Tipton Shale)		A ramshorn snail.	
Planorbidae	†Headonia	†H. pseudoammonius (Schlotheim, 1820)	Lake Gosiute (Laney, Tipton Shale)		A ramshorn snail First reported as Biomphalaria pseudoammonius (1820)	
Planorbidae	?Drepanotrema	?D. sp.	Lake Gosiute (Laney)		An undescribed ramshorn snail.	
Planorbidae	Gyraulus	G. militaris (C.A. White, 1880)	Lake Gosiute (Tipton Shale)		A ramshorn snail.	
Planorbidae	Omalodiscus	†O. cirrus (C. A. White, 1879)	Lake Gosiute (Tipton Shale)		A ramshorn snail.	
Physidae	Physa	†?P. longiuscula Meek & Hayden, 1856	Lake Gosiute (Tipton Shale)		A bladder snail.	
Physidae	Physa	P. sp.	Lake Gosiute (Laney)		An undescribed bladder snail.	
Physidae	Physella	†P. bridgerensis (Meek, 1873)	Lake Gosiute (Laney, Tipton Shale)		A bladder snail. First named Physa bridgerensis (1873)	
Physidae	Physella	†P. pleromatis (C. A. White, 1877)	Lake Gosiute (Tipton Shale)		A bladder snail. First named Physa pleromatis (1877)	
Pleuroceridae	Elimia	†E. tenera (J. Hall, 1845)	Lake Gosiute (Laney, Tipton Shale, Wilkins Peak)		A pleurocerid snail. the most common snail in the formation The source of the famous "Turritella agate".	
Urocoptidae	Holospira	H. sp.			An undescribed urocoptid land snail.	
Valvatidae	Valvata	†V. subumbilicata (Meek & Hayden, 1856)	Lake Gosiute (Laney, Tipton Shale)		A valve snail.	
Valvatidae	Valvata	Cf. †V. filosa Whiteaves, 1885	Lake Gosiute (Laney, Tipton Shale)		An undescribed valve snail. Similar to Valvata filosa	
Viviparidae	Viviparus	†V. meeki Wenz, 1930	Lake Gosiute (Laney, Tipton Shale)		A river snail. First named Paludina trochiformis (1856 non-von Zieten, 1830)	
Viviparidae	Viviparus	†V. paludinaeformis (J. Hall, 1845)	Lake Gosiute (Tipton Shale)		A river snail.	

== Fungi ==
Genus	Species	Member	Abundance	Notes	Image
†Caenomyces	C. eucalypti Knowlton, 1923	Lake Unita	1 specimen	A possible ascomycotan leaf spot fungus morphospecies. Hosted on Syzygioides americana leaves. Brown (1934) considered all leaf spots of the formation to be indeterminate †Sphaerites species. First named as Caenomyces eucalyptae.	
†Caenomyces	†C. planerae R.W. Brown, 1929	Lake Unita	1 specimen	A possible ascomycotan leaf spot fungus morphospecies. Hosted on a Cedrelospermum nervosum leaf. Brown (1934) considered all leaf spots of the formation to be indeterminate †Sphaerites species.	
†Caenomyces	†C. sapindicola Knowlton, 1923	Lake Unita	1 specimen	A possible ascomycotan leaf spot fungus morphospecies. Hosted on the Toxicodendron winchesteri holotype leaf. Brown (1934) considered all leaf spots of the formation to be indeterminate †Sphaerites species.	
†Eoglobella	†E. longipes Bradley, 1931	Lake Unita	1 specimen	A Staurosporaen fungal spore of uncertain affiliation.	
Entophlyctis	†E. willoughbyi Bradley, 1967	Lake Gosiute (Wilkins Peak Member)		An aquatic chytridialean fungi.	
Pleotrachelus	†P. askaulos Bradley, 1967	Lake Gosiute (Wilkins Peak Member)		An aquatic chytridialean fungi.	
†Sphaerites	†S. myricae (Lesquereux) Meschinelli, 1892	Lake Gosiute	1 specimen	A possible ascomycotan leaf spot fungus morphospecies. Hosted on a "Rhus" nigricans leaf. First described as Sphaeria myricae (1878); Brown (1934) considered all leaf spots of the formation to be indeterminate †Sphaerites species.	

== Unicellular microbiota ==
=== Cyanobacteria ===
Family	Genus	Species	Member	Abundance	Notes	Image
Chroococcaceae	Chroococcus	?Cf. C. dispersus (Von Keissler) Lemmerman	Lake Unita		An aquatic chroococcacean cyanobacteria.	
Chroococcaceae	Chroococcus	Cf. C. westii (W. West) P. Boye, 1929	Lake Unita		An aquatic chroococcacean cyanobacteria.	
Coleofasciculaceae	Stigonema	†S. anchistina Bradley, 1970	Lake Gosiute (Wilkins Peak Member)		An aquatic coleofasciculacean cyanobacteria.	
Coleofasciculaceae	Symploca	†S. hedraia Bradley, 1970	Lake Gosiute (Wilkins Peak Member)		An aquatic coleofasciculacean cyanobacteria.	
Gomontiellaceae	Crinalium	?Cf. C. endophyticum Crow	Lake Unita		An aquatic gomontiellaceous cyanobacteria.	
Gomontiellaceae	Crinalium	C. sp.	Lake Unita		An aquatic gomontiellaceous cyanobacteria. First identified as Spirulina sp. (1916)	
Hapalosiphonaceae	Hapalosiphon	H. confervaceus Borzi	Lake Unita		An aquatic hapalosiphonaceous cyanobacteria.	

=== Algae ===
Family	Genus	Species	Member	Abundance	Notes	Image
Chaetophoraceae	Stigeoclonium?	Cf. S.? lubricum (Dillwyn) Kützing	Lake Unita	1 specimen	A possible chaetophoraceous chlorophyte green algae.	
Chlorellaceae	†Chlorellopsis	†C. coloniata Reis, 1923		numerous	A unicellular stromatolite forming green algae.	
Chlorellaceae	†Confervites	†C. mantiensis Bradley, 1929	Lake Uinta (Manti beds)		A filamentous stromatolite forming green algae.	
Hydrodictyaceae	Tetraedron	Cf. T. regulare var. torsum (Turner) Brunnthaler	Lake Unita	1 specimen	A hydrodictyaceous chlorophyte green algae.	
Microsporaceae	Microspora	Cf. M. pachyderma (Wille) Lagerheim	Lake Unita	1 specimen	A sphaeroplealean chlorophyte green algae.	
Oocystaceae	Cf. Eremosphaera	E. sp.	Lake Unita		An oocystacean chlorophyte green algae.	
Scenedesmaceae	Coelastrum	Cf. C. verrucosum Retnsch	Lake Unita		A sphaeroplealean chlorophyte green algae.	
Schizochlamydaceae	Schizochlamys	†S. haywellensis Bradley, 1970	Lake Gosiute (Wilkins Peak Member)		A sphaeroplealean chlorophyte green algae.	

=== Charophytes ===
Family	Genus	Species	Member	Abundance	Notes	Image
Zygnemataceae	Spirogyra	†S. wyomingia Bradley, 1970	Lake Gosiute (Wilkins Peak Member)		A zygnematacean charophyte green algae.	

=== Euglenozoans ===
Family	Genus	Species	Member	Abundance	Notes	Image
Phacaceae	Phacus	Cf. P. caudata Hübner, 1886		1 specimen	A Euglenozoan algal flagellate.	

=== Amoebozoans ===
Family	Genus	Species	Member	Abundance	Notes	Image
Difflugiidae	Difflugia	†D. calcifera Bradley, 931	Lake Unita	1 specimen	A difflugiid lobose testate amoeba.	
Quadrulidae	Quadrula	†Q. minuta Bradley, 1931	Lake Unita	1 specimen	A quadrulid lobose testate amoeba.	

=== Cercozoans ===
Family	Genus	Species	Member	Abundance	Notes	Image
Euglyphidae	Euglypha	†E. robusticornis Bradley, 1931	Lake Unita		A Cercozoan eukaryote.	

== Plants ==
=== Liverworts ===
Family	Genus	Species	Member	Abundance	Notes	Image
Jungermanniaceae	†Jungermannites	†J. eophilus (Cockerell) Steere, 1947	Lake Unita	1 specimen	A leafy liverwort morphospecies. First described as Lejeunea eophila (1925).	

=== Lycophytes ===
Family	Genus	Species	Member	Abundance	Notes	Image
Isoetaceae	†Isoetites	†I. horridus (Dawson) R.W. Brown, 1939	Lake Unita	1 specimen	An isoetaceous quillwort morphospecies. First described as Carpolithes horridus (1884).	

=== Ferns ===
Family	Genus	Species	Member	Abundance	Notes	Image
Aspleniaceae	Asplenium	†A. delicatula (R.W. Brown) MacGinitie, 1969			A spleenwort fern leaf morphospecies. First described as Aneimia delicatula (1929); Includes Phyllites furcivena (1934); Jr homonym of Asplenium delicatulum C. Presl, 1825	
Aspleniaceae	Asplenium	†A. eoligniticum Berry, 1916	Lake Unita	2 specimens	A spleenwort fern leaf morphospecies.	
Equisetaceae	Equisetum	†E. haydenii Lesquereux, 1872	Not Green River Formation		A scouring rush morphospecies. First ascribed to the formation Excluded by Knowlton (1923) as a Washakie Formation species.	
Equisetaceae	Equisetum	†E. winchesteri Brown, 1929	Lake Gosiute	1 specimen	A scouring rush morphospecies.	
Equisetaceae	Equisetum	†E. wyomingense Lesquereux, 1873	Lake Gosiute; Lake Unita		A scouring rush morphospecies.	
Lygodiaceae	Lygodium	†L. dentoni Lesquereux, 1875	Rejected	1? specimen	A climbing fern species. Type specimens missing by 1923; Brown (1934) rejected per Knowlton and dubious locality.	
Lygodiaceae	Lygodium	†L. kaulfussi Heer, 1861	Fossil Lake; Lake Gosiute; Lake Unita	Numerous	A climbing fern species. First described as Lygodium neuropteroides (1870)	
Marsileaceae	Marsilea	†M. sprungerorum Hermsen, 2019	Lake Uinta (Parachute Creek Member)	Numerous	A water clover fern.	
Osmundaceae	Osmunda?	†Q.? sepulta (Newberry) Knowlton, 1923	Lake Gosiute	2 specimens	A possible osmundaceous fern leaf morphospecies. First described as Pecopteris sepulta (1883)	
Salviniaceae	Azolla	†A. berryi Brown, 1934	Lake Unita	1 specimen	A mosquito fern morphospecies.	
Salviniaceae	Salvinia	†S. preauriculata Berry, 1925			A watermoss morphospecies.	
Pteridaceae	Acrostichum	†A. hesperium Newberry, 1883	Lake Gosiute	3 specimens	A parkerioid leather fern leaf morphospecies.	

=== Cycadalean palynomorphs ===
Genus	Species	Member	Abundance	Notes	Image
†Cycadopites	†C. sp.	Lake Uinta (Parachute Creek Member)	Numerous	Various Cycas - Zamia Cycad palynomorphs.	
†Dioonipites	†D. sp.	Lake Uinta (Parachute Creek Member)	5 specimens	A Dioon like Cycad palynomorph.	

=== Conifers ===
Family	Genus	Species	Member	Abundance	Notes	Image
Cupressaceae	Sequoia	Cf. †S. affinis Lesquereux, 1876	Lake Unita		A coast redwood relative.	
Pinaceae	Picea	†P. pinifructus Brown, 1929	Lake Unita	1 specimen	First identified as a spruce seed. Deemed a jr synonym of Cercidiphyllum arcticum by Brown (1939).	
Pinaceae	Pinus	†P. balli Brown, 1934	Lake Unita	1 specimen	A 3-needle pine morphospecies.	
Pinaceae	Pinus	†P. florissanti Lesquereux, 1885	Lake Unita	1 specimen	A pine morphospecies.	
incertae sedis	†Taxites	†T. eocenica Brown, 1929	Lake Uinta	1 specimen	Isolated conifer needles of uncertain affiliation. Similar to some Cupressaceae, Pinaceae, and Taxaceae genera.	

==== Conifer palynomorphs ====
Genus	Species	Member	Abundance	Notes	Image
Abies	†A. concolipites Wodehouse, 1933	Lake Uinta (Parachute Creek Member)	2 specimens	A true fir palynomorph similar to Abies concolor.	
†Abietipites	†A. antiquus Wodehouse, 1933	Lake Uinta (Parachute Creek Member)	2 specimens	A generally abietine-like palyonomorph.	
†Cedripites	†C. eocenicus Wodehouse, 1933	Lake Uinta (Parachute Creek Member)	1 specimen	A Cedrus libani cedar-like palyonomorph.	
†Inaperturopollenites	†I. concedipites (Wodehouse) Krutzsch, 1971	Lake Uinta (Parachute Creek Member)	6 specimens	A Cunninghamia-like palyonomorph. First described as Cunninghamia concedipites (1933).	
†Inaperturopollenites	†I. vacuipites (Wodehouse) Krutzsch, 1971	Lake Uinta (Parachute Creek Member)	1 specimen	A Chinese swamp cypress-like palyonomorph. First described as Glyptostrobus vacuipites (1933).	
Picea	†P. grandivescipites Wodehouse, 1933	Lake Uinta (Parachute Creek Member)	6 specimens	A spruce palyonomorph.	
Pinus	†P. scopulipites Wodehouse, 1933	Lake Uinta (Parachute Creek Member)	Numerous	A pine palyonomorph. Less common than P. strobipites.	
Pinus	†P. strobipites Wodehouse, 1933	Lake Uinta (Parachute Creek Member)	Numerous	A pine palyonomorph.	
Pinus	†P. tuberculipites Wodehouse, 1933	Lake Uinta (Parachute Creek Member)	6 specimens	A pine palyonomorph.	
Taxodium	†T. hiatipites Wodehouse, 1933	Lake Uinta (Parachute Creek Member)	Numerous	A bald cypress palyonomorph.	
†Tsugaepollenites	†T. viridifluminipites (Wodehouse) R. Potonié, 1958	Lake Uinta (Parachute Creek Member)	1 specimen	A hemlock-like palyonomorph. First described as Tsuga viridifluminipites (1933); Moved from Zonalapollenites viridifluminipites (1953).	

=== Gnetalean palynomorphs ===
Genus	Species	Member	Abundance	Notes	Image
†Gnetaceae-pollenites	†G. eocenipites (Wodehouse) R. Potonié, 1958	Lake Uinta (Parachute Creek Member)	12 specimens	An Ephedra-like palyonomorph. First described as Ephedra eocenipites (1933).	

=== Magnoliids ===
Family	Genus	Species	Member	Abundance	Notes	Image
Aristolochiaceae	Aristolochia	†A. mortua Cockerell, 1908			A pipevine leaf morphospecies.	
Hernandiaceae	Illigera	†I. eocenica Manchester & O'Leary, 2010	Lake Unita		An Illigera seed morphospecies.	
Lauraceae	Beilschmiedia	†B. eocenica (R.W. Brown) MacGinitie, 1969 (non-Reid & Chandler, 1933)			A Beilschmiedia leaf morphospecies. Name a jr homonym of Beilschmiedia eocenica E. Reid & M. Chandler, 1933	
Lauraceae	Lindera	†L. allardi MacGinitie, 1969			A spicebush leaf morphospecies.	
Lauraceae	Lindera	†L. varifolia MacGinitie, 1969	Lake Unita		A spicebush leaf morphospecies.	
Lauraceae	Ocotea	†O. coloradensis (R.W. Brown) LaMotte, 1952)	Lake Unita	2 specimens	An Ocotea leaf morphospecies. First described as Oreodaphne coloradensis (1934)	
Lauraceae	Ocotea	†O. lancifolia (Lesquereux) LaMotte, 1952	Lake Gosiute; Lake Unita	2 specimens	An Ocotea leaf morphospecies. First described as Sapindus lancifolius (1883); Moved from Oreodaphne lancifolia (1934); Also includes Oreodaphne knowltoni (1929)	
Lauraceae	Persea	†P. coriacea MacGinitie, 1969 (non-Engelhardt, 1895)			A Persea leaf morphospecies. Name a jr homonym of Persea coriacea Engelhardt, 1895	
Magnoliaceae	Talauma	†T. multiperforata Kruse, 1954	Lake Gosiute (Eden Valley)		A magnolia wood morphospecies.	

==== Magnoliid palynomorphs ====
Genus	Species	Member	Abundance	Notes	Image
Liriodendron	†L. psilopites Wodehouse, 1933	Lake Uinta (Parachute Creek Member)	1 specimen	A Liriodendron tulipifera-like tulip tree palyonomorph.	

=== Monocots ===
Family	Genus	Species	Member	Abundance	Notes	Image
Araceae	†Anomacolocasioides	†Anomacolocasioides demkovichorum Gieser, Donovan & Herrera in Gieser et al., 2026	Fossil Lake (Fossil Butte Member)		An "elephant ear" plant relative.	
Araceae	†Gigantosagittata	†Gigantosagittata graingeriana Gieser, Donovan & Herrera in Gieser et al., 2026	Fossil Lake (Fossil Butte Member)		An "elephant ear" plant relative.	
Arecaceae	†Palmacites	†P. florissanti (Lesquereux) Read & Hickey, 1972	Fossil Lake; Lake Uinta		A palmately veined palm leaf morphospecies. Moved from Sabalites florissanti (1930); First described as Flabellaria florissanti (1885).	
Arecaceae	†Palmoxylon	†P. colei Tidwell, 1973	Lake Gosiute (Eden Valley)		A palm wood morphospecies.	
Arecaceae	†Palmoxylon	†P. contortum Tidwell, 1973	Lake Gosiute (Eden Valley)		A palm wood morphospecies.	
Arecaceae	†Palmoxylon	†P. edenense Tidwell, 1973	Lake Gosiute (Eden Valley)		A palm wood morphospecies.	
Arecaceae	†Palmoxylon	†P. macginitiei Tidwell et al., 1971	Lake Gosiute (Eden Valley)		A palm wood morphospecies.	
Arecaceae	†Phoenicites	†P. haydenii (Newberry) Read & Hickey, 1972	Lake Gosiute	1 specimen	A pinnately veined palm leaf morphospecies. Moved from Geonomites haydenii (1923); First described as Manicaria haydenii (1883). Phoenicites haydenii as Manicaria haydenii	
Arecaceae	Phoenix	†P. windmillis	Fossil Lake (Fossil Butte member); Lake Gosiute (Laney Member); Lake Unita (Parachute Creek Member)	numerous	A Phoenix flower morphospecies.	
Arecaceae	†Sabalites	†S. powellii (Newberry) Berry, 1930	Fossil Lake; Lake Uinta		A palmate veined palm leaf morphospecies. First described as Sabal powellii (1883).	
Cyperaceae?	†Cyperacites	†C.? filiferus	Lake Unita	A number of specimens	Likely rhizomes of monocots?. Oldest specimen first described as Diatryma? filifera, a Gastornis feather. Description of the species as a bird feather was questioned by Alexander Wetmore (1930); Brown (1934) moves the species to Carpolithus filiferus A second group of fossils is described as a cactus, Eopuntia douglassi (1944); Brown redescribed both as cypreaceous rhizomes, and synonymized both species as Cyperus filiferus (1959); Herman Becker (1963) agrees with the synonymy, but moves the species to the Cyperacites morphogenus as Cyperacites? filiferus.	
Cyperaceae?	†Cyperacites	†C. haydenii (Lesquereux) Knowlton, 1898	Lake Gosiute	Several specimens	A sedge-like leaf morphospecies. First described as Cyperites haydenii (1885)	
Cyperaceae?	Cyperus	†C. chavannesi Heer, 1855	Rejected	1 specimen	A sedge leaf morphospecies. Rejected by Knowlton (1923) due to dubious location.	
Dioscoreaceae	Dioscorea	†D. lindgrenii Herrera & Manchester	Fossil Lake (Fossil Butte Member)	2 specimens	sweet potato fruits	
Dioscoreaceae	Dioscorea	†D. shermanii Herrera & Manchester	Fossil Lake (Fossil Butte Member)	1 specimen	sweet potato fruits	
Juncaceae	Juncus	Indeterminate	Rejected	?	Scrappy material tentatively identified as rush leaves. Discredited by Knowlton (1923) due to missing specimens	
Poaceae	Arundo	†A. reperta Lesquereux, 1876	Lake Uinta	Several specimens	A giant cane grass morphospecies. The species validity of the fossils was questioned by Knowlton (1923); The species was retained by Brown (1934).	
Potamogetonaceae	Potamogeton	†P. rubus R.W. Brown, 1934	Lake Unita		A pondweed morphotype.	
Typhaceae	Sparganium	†S. antiquum (Newberry) Berry, 1924	Lake Gosiute; Lake Uinta		A bur-reed leaf morphospecies. Moved from Brasenia? antiqua (1883) includes Pontederites hesperia (1923)	
Typhaceae	Sparganium	†S. eocenicum R.W. Brown, 1929	Lake Gosiute	1 specimen	A bur-reed leaf morphospecies.	
Typhaceae	Typha	†T. lesquereuxi Cockerell, 1906	Lake Unita		A cattail morphospecies.	
Zingiberaceae	†Musophyllum	†M. complicatum Lesquereux, 1873	Lake Gosiute	5 specimens	A zingiberaceous monocot leaf morphotaxon.	

==== Monocot palynomorphs ====
Genus	Species	Member	Abundance	Notes	Image
†Arecipites	†A. punctatus Wodehouse, 1933	Lake Uinta (Parachute Creek Member)	1 specimen	A Phoenix dactylifera-like palm palyonomorph.	
†Arecipites	†A. rugosus Wodehouse, 1933	Lake Uinta (Parachute Creek Member)	1 specimen	A palm palyonomorph.	
†Peltandripites	†P. davisii Wodehouse, 1933	Lake Uinta (Parachute Creek Member)	1 specimen	A tuckahoe-like arrow-arum palyonomorph.	
Potamogeton	†P. hollickipites Wodehouse, 1933	Lake Uinta (Parachute Creek Member)	Numerous	A Potamogeton palyonomorph.	
†Smilacipites	†S. echinatus Wodehouse, 1933	Lake Uinta (Parachute Creek Member)	2 specimen	A Smilax-like palyonomorph.	
†Smilacipites	†S. herbaceoides Wodehouse, 1933	Lake Uinta (Parachute Creek Member)	1 specimen	A Smilax-like palyonomorph.	
†Smilacipites	†S. molloides Wodehouse, 1933	Lake Uinta (Parachute Creek Member)	1 specimen	A Smilax mollis-like palyonomorph.	

=== Ceratophyllales ===
Family	Genus	Species	Member	Abundance	Notes	Image
Ceratophyllaceae	Ceratophyllum	†C. muricatum incertum (Brown) Herendeen, Les, & Dilcher, 1990	Fossil Lake	19 Specimens	A prickly hornwort subspecies. First described as a full species by Berry (1930). Moved to subspecies by Herendeen, Les, & Dilcher (1990)	

=== Eudicots ===
==== Basal Eudicots ====
Family	Genus	Species	Member	Abundance	Notes	Image
Berberidaceae	"Mahonia"	†"M." eocenica (R.W. Brown) C.A. Arnold, 1936	Lake Uinta	1 Specimen	An oregon grape leaf morphospecies. First described as Odostemon eocenica (1934)	
Menispermaceae	†Menispermites	†M. limacioides MacGinitie, 1969			A moon-seed leaf morphospecies.	
Menispermaceae	Stephania	†S. wilfii Han & Manchester, 2017	Lake Uinta (Wilkins Peak Member)	Numerous	A moon-seed fruit.	
Nelumbonaceae	†Nelumbo	Undescribed	Lake Gosiute		An undescribed Lotus leaf species.	
Platanaceae	†Macginitiea	†M. wyomingensis (Knowlton & Cockerell) Manchester, 1986	Lake Untia (Parachute Creek Member)		A sycamore relative species. First named Aralia macrophylla Newberry, 1882 (non-Lindley, 1844); Renamed to Aralia wyomingensis (1919); Moved from Platanus wyomingensis (1969)	
Platanaceae	†Platanites	†P. fremontensis (Berry) Nares, Huegele, Manchester	Lake Untia (Parachute Creek Member)	multiple specimens	A sycamore relative species. First described as Negundo fremontensis (1930); Moved from Aleurites fremontensis (1974)	
Proteaceae	Lomatia	†L.? microphylla Lesquereux, 1876	Rejected	specimens missing	First identified as a guitarplant leaf morphospecies. Rejected by Brown (1934) due to missing specimens & dubious locality.	
Trochodendraceae?	†Nordenskioldia	†N. borealis Heer, 1870	Rejected		A basal trochodendroid Rejected by Manchester, Crane & Dilcher (1991) considered Carpites cocculoides like.	

==== Superasterids ====
Family	Genus	Species	Member	Abundance	Notes	Image
Apocynaceae	†Apocynospermum	†A. coloradensis Brown, 1929	Lake Unita	1 specimen	An apocynaceous seed morphospecies.	
Apocynaceae	†Aspidospermoxylon	†A. uniseriatum Kruse, 1954	Lake Gosiute		An apocynaceous wood morphospecies.	
Araliaceae	†Allopanax	†A. quinus (Macginitie) Doweld	Lake Uinta (Parachute Creek Member)		An Apialean leaf mophogenus. Moved from Araliophyllum quinus (1969).	
Caryophyllaceae	†Alsinites	†A. revelatus Cockerell, 1925	Lake Unita	1 specimen	A caryophyllacous flower morphotaxon.	
Ericaceae	Andromeda	†A. delicatula Lesquereux, 1885		2 specimens	A possible bog rosemary ericaceous morphospecies.	
Oleaceae	Osmanthus	†O. praemissa (Lesquereux) Cockerell, 1906	Lake Uinta		An Osmanthus leaf morphospecies. Moved from Olea praemissa (1885)	
Oleaceae	Osmanthus	†O. viridiflumensis (Knowlton) MacGinitie, 1969)	Lake Uinta	1 specimen	An Osmanthus leaf morphospecies. Moved from Ocotea viridiflumensis (1952); First described as Oreodaphne viridiflumensis (1923)	
Polemoniaceae	†Gilisenium	†G. hueberi Lot, Manchester, & Dilcher, 1998	Fossil Lake	1 specimen	A polemoniaceous herb species.	
Solanaceae	†Lycianthoides	†L. calycina Deanna et al.	Lake Uinta (Parachute Creek Member)	3 specimens	A nightshade family fruit	
Styracaceae	Styrax	†S. transversa MacGinitie, 1969	Lake Unita		A snowbell leaf morphotype.	
Symplocaceae	Symplocos	†S. exilis MacGinitie, 1969	Lake Unita		A Symplocaceous leaf morphotype.	
Incertae sedis	†Othniophyton	†O. elongatum (MacGinitie) Manchester, Judd, Correa-Narvaez, 2024	Lake Unita		A superastrid plant of possible caryophyllalean affinity. First described as Oreopanax elongatum (1969) O. elongatum synonymy: Apocynophyllurn wilcoxense (of Berry, 1929); ?Celastrophyllum lesquereuxii (1929); Ternstroemites viridifluminis (1929)	

==== Superrosids ====
Family	Genus	Species	Member	Abundance	Notes	Image
Altingiaceae	Liquidambar	†L. callarche Cockerell, 1925	Lake Unita	2 specimens	A sweetgum species.	
Anacardiaceae	†Barkleya	†B. schinoloxa (R. W. Brown) Manchester & Judd	Lake Gosiute (Laney Member); Lake Uinta (Parachute Creek Member)	Numerous	An anacardiaceous samara. Moved from Anacardites schinoloxus (1929). Includes Anacardites schinus R. W. Brown, 1934; Possibly the fruits of "Rhus" nigricans.	
Anacardiaceae	†Edenoxylon	†E. parviareolatum Kruse, 1954	Lake Gosiute (Eden Valley)		An anacardiaceous wood morphospecies.	
Anacardiaceae	Rhus	†R. longepetiolata (Lesquereux) R.W. Brown, 1934	Lake Gosiute		An anacardiaceous leaf morphotype. Moved from Ailanthus longepetiolatus (1934)	
Anacardiaceae	Rhus	†"R." nigricans (Lesquereux) Knowlton, 1923	Lake Gosiute (Laney Member); Lake Uinta (Parachute Creek Member)	Numerous	An anacardiaceous leaf morphotype. Moved from Myrica nigricans (1929). Possibly the leaves of Barkleya schinoloxa. "R." nigricans synonymy: Comptonia insignis Lesquereux of Brown, 1934; Cupanites nigricans (Lesquereux) Berry, 1924; Koelreuteria nigricans (Lesquereux) Brown, 1946; Koelreuteria viridifluminis (Hollick) Brown, 1934; Myrica alkalina Lesquereux, 1883; Myrica ludwigii Schimper of Lesquereux, 1872; Myrica undulata? Schimper of Lesquereux,1878 (pro part); Myrica zachariensis Saporta of Lesquereux, 1883 (pro part); Planera variabilis Newberry, 1883 (pro part); Rhus myricoides Knowlton, 1923; Rhus variabilis (Newberry) Knowlton, 1923; Staphylea viridiftuminis Hollick, 1929	
Anacardiaceae	Schmaltzia	†S. vexans Cockerell, 1906	Lake Gosiute		A sumac leaf morphospecies. Moved from Rhus vexans (1885); Considered nomen dubium by MacGinitie (1969)	
Anacardiaceae	†Schinoxylon	†S. actinoporosum Kruse, 1954	Lake Gosiute (Eden Valley)		An anacardiaceous wood morphospecies.	
Anacardiaceae	Toxicodendron	†T. winchesteri (Knowlton) MacGinitie, 1969	Lake Gosiute		A poison oak leaf morphospecies. First described as Sapindus winchesteri (1923)	
Burseraceae	Bursera	†B. inaequilateralis (Lesquereux) MacGinitie, 1969			A bursera leaf morphotype. First named as Alnites unaequilateralis (1876) B. inaequilateralis synonymy: Alnites unaequilateralis Lesquereux, 1878; Alnus inaequilateralis (Lesquereux) Lesquereux, 1883; Comptonia? anomala Knowlton, 1923; Planera inaequilateralis (Lesquereux) Knowlton, 1923; Planera variabilis Newberry, 1883	
Cannabaceae	Celtis	†C. mccoshii Lesquereux, 1883	Lake Gosiute; Lake Unita	2 specimens	A hackberry leaf morphospecies. Includes Celtis debequensis (1928)	
Capparaceae	†Forchhammerioxylon	†F. scleroticum Kruse, 1954	Lake Gosiute (Eden Valley)		A capparaceous wood morphospecies.	
Celastraceae	Celastrus	†C. winchesteri (Knowlton) MacGinitie, 1969	Lake Unita	1 specimen	A staff vine leaf morphospecies. Moved from Juglans winchesteri (1923); Includes Juglans alkalina (1875 [1876] )	cetner
Celastraceae	†Celastrophyllum	†C. emarginatum	Lake Unita		A staff vine relative leaf morphospecies. MacGinitie (1969) considered the species nomen dubium.	
Crassulaceae	Sedum?	†S.? hesperium Knowlton, 1923	Lake Uinta	1 specimen	A possible stonecrop leaf morphospecies. Considered nomen dubium by MacGinitie (1969)	
Euphorbiaceae	†Heveoxylon	†H. microporosum Kruse, 1954	Lake Gosiute (Eden Valley)		A euphorb wood morphospecies.	
Fabaceae	Amorpha	†A. utensis Cockerell, 1925	Lake Unita	1 specimen	A legume leaf morphospecies.	
Fabaceae	Arcoa	†A. lindgreni Herendeen & Herrera, 2019	Fossil Lake	3 specimens	A caesalpinioid legume.	
Fabaceae	Caesalpinia	†C. flumen-viridensis Herendeen & Dilcher, 1991	Lake Gosiute	2 specimens	A Caesalpinia subg. Mezoneuron seed morphospecies.	
Fabaceae	Caesalpinia	†"C." pecorae R.W. Brown, 1956	Lake Unita	2 specimens	First named as a Caesalpinia leaf morphospecies. Considered a Detarieae tribe species by Herendeen & Dilcher (1991).	
Fabaceae	†Caesalpinites	†C. falcatus MacGinitie, 1969			A Caesalpinia-like leaf morphospecies.	
Fabaceae	Cercis	†C. tenuinervis (Lesquereux) R.W. Brown, 1934	Lake Gosiute	1 specimen	A redbud leaf morphospecies. Considered nomen dubium by MacGinitie (1969).	
Fabaceae	Erythrina	†E. roanensis MacGinitie, 1969	Lake Unita		A coral tree leaf morphospecies.	
Fabaceae	Gymnocladus	†G. hesperia (R.W. Brown) MacGinitie, 1969	Lake Uinta		A coffeetree leaf morphospecies. Moved from Cassia hesperia (1929); Includes Chrysobalanus lacustris (1929) & Banisteria bradleyi (1929)	
Fabaceae	†Leguminosites	†L. alternans Lesquereux, 1875 [1876]	Rejected		A legume leaf morphospecies. Rejected due to missing specimens by Knowlton (1923) and Brown (1934)	
Fabaceae	†Leguminosites	†L. lesquereuxiana Knowlton, 1898	Lake Unita		A legume leaf morphospecies. L. lesquereuxiana synonymy: Bumelia coloradensis Cockerell, 1925; Dalbergia knowltoni Cockerell, 1925; Dalbergia retusa Knowlton, 1923 [non-Hemsl. 1878]; Leguminosites cassioides Lesquereux, 1878 [non-Engelhardt, 1870]; Sophora coloradensis Knowlton, 1923	
Fabaceae	†Leguminosites	†L. regularis MacGinitie, 1969	Lake Unita		A legume leaf morphospecies.	
Fabaceae	↑Parvileguminophyllum	†P. coloradensis (Knowlton) Call & Dilcher, 1994	Lake Uinta		A legume leaf morphospecies. Moved from Mimosites coloradensis (1923). P. coloradensis synonymy: Podogonium americanum Lesquereux, 1878 (of Brown 1929); Mimosites debequensis R.W. Brown, 1929; Mimosites falcatus R.W. Brown, 1929	
Fabaceae	Swartzia	†S. wardelli MacGinitie, 1969	Lake Uinta		A swartzieous leaf morphotype.	
Fagaceae	Quercus	†Q. castaneopsis Lesquereux, 1883	Lake Gosiute; Lake Uinta	Several fragmentary specimens	An oak morphospecies. P. cinnamomoides synonymy: Quercus castanoides Newberry, 1883; Ilex maculata Lesquereux, 1883; Ilex? affinis Lesquereux, 1872; Considered nomen dubium by MacGinitie (1969).	
Fagaceae	Quercus	†"Q. cuneatus" MacGinitie, 1969 (non-Wangenh. 1787	Lake Unita		An oak leaf morphospecies. Name a jr homonym of Quercus cuneata Wangenheim, 1787	
Fagaceae	Quercus	†Q. drymeja Unger, 1847	Rejected		An oak morphospecies. First described from Europe, Rejected from flora by MacGinitie (1969).	
Fagaceae	Quercus	†Q. petros MacGinitie, 1969	Lake Unita		An oak leaf morphospecies.	
Fagaceae	Quercus	†Q. utensis Cockerell, 1927	Lake Unita		An oak morphospecies. Considered nomen dubium by MacGinitie (1969).	
Hamamelidaceae	Distylium	†D. eocenica (R.W. Brown) MacGinitie, 1969	Lake Unita	1 specimen	A winter-hazel leaf morphotype. Moved from Betula coloradea (1934); First named Betula eocenica (1928 non Ettingshausen (1858); Also includes Grewiopsis cissifolius (1929)	
Juglandaceae	Juglans	†J. crossii Knowlton, 1898	Lake Gosiute	1 specimen?	A walnut leaf morphospecies.	
Juglandaceae	Juglans	†J. bilinica Unger, 1850		1 specimen	A walnut leaf morphospecies. Moved from Hicoria juglandiformis (1898)	
Juglandaceae	Juglans	†J. schimperi Lesquereux, 1873	Lake Unita		A walnut leaf morphospecies. Includes Juglans occidentalis (1883) & Ficus ungeri (1872)	
Juglandaceae	†Palaeocarya	Cf. †P. clarnensis Manchester, 1987	Lake Gosiute?		A Palaeocarya nut morphospecies similar to Palaeocarya clarnensis.	
Juglandaceae	†Palaeocarya	†P. uintaensis (MacGinitie) Manchester, 1987	Lake Unita		A Palaeocarya nut morphospecies.	
Juglandaceae	Platycarya	†P. castaneopsis (Lesquereux) Wing & Hickey, 1984	Fossil Lake; Lake Uinta		A Platycarya species. Moved from Quercus castaneopsis (1883)	
Juglandaceae	Pterocarya	†P. macginitii Manchester & Dilcher, 1982	Lake Gosiute		A wingnut seed morphospecies.	
Juglandaceae	Pterocarya	†P. roanensis MacGinitie, 1969	Lake Unita		A wingnut leaf morphospecies.	
Malvaceae	Hibiscus	†H. roanensis R.W. Brown, 1934	Lake Unita		An Hibiscus leaf morphospecies.	
Malvaceae	Ochroma	†O. murata R.W. Brown, 1934	Lake Unita	1 specimen	A balsa tree leaf morphospecies.	
Malvaceae	Sterculia	†S. coloradensis R.W. Brown, 1929	Lake Unita	1 specimen	A sterculioid leaf morphospecies.	
Malvaceae	Triumfetta	T. ovata MacGinitie, 1969 (non-De Candolle, 1824)			A burbark leaf morphospecies. Jr homonym of Triumfetta ovata De Candolle, 1824	
Meliaceae	Cedrela	†C. trainii C.A. Arnold, 1936	Lake Unita		A meliaceous leaf morphospecies.	
Moraceae	†Welkoetoxylon	†W. multiseriatum Boonchai, Manchester & Wheeler	Lake Gosiute (Tipton Shale Member)	1 specimen	A moraceous wood morphogenus.	
Myricaceae	Morella scalariformis	†M. scalariformis (Kruse), Wheeler & Manchester, 2021	Lake Gosiute (Eden Valley)		A myricaceous wood morphospecies. First named as Myrica scalariformis (1954); Moved from Myricoxylon scalariforme (1962)	
Myricaceae	Myrica	†M. salicina Unger, 1850	Rejected	sp missing	Identified as a European Myrica species Rejected by Knowlton (1923) due to the specimens being missing.	
Myrtaceae	†Syzygioides	†S. americana (Lesquereux) Manchester, Dilcher, & Wing, 1998	Lake Unita	Circa 26 specimens	A myrtaceous species. First described as Eucalyptus americana (1872); Includes Ficus omballi (1929) & Eugenia americana (1969)	
Rhamnaceae	†Berchemiopsis	†B. paucidentata MacGinitie, 1969	Lake Unita		A rhamnaceous leaf morphotype.	
Rhamnaceae	Ptelea	†P. cassioides (Lesquereux) MacGinitie, 1969	Rejected		Type specimen leaf from the Florissant Formation; Green River Fruits rejected by Call & Dilcher as not Ptelea.	
Rhamnaceae	Ptelea	†P. paliuruoides (R.W. Brown) Manchester & O'Leary, 2010	Lake Unita		A rhamnaceous seed morphospecies. First describe as Carpolithus paliuroides (1934)	
Rhamnaceae	†Rainbowia	†R. rhamnoides Manchester & O'Leary, 2010	Lake Unita		A rhamnaceous seed morphospecies.	
Rosaceae	Prunus	†P. stewarti MacGinitie, 1969	Lake Gosiute		A cherry leaf morphospecies. First named Amygdalus gracilis (1883); Moved from jr homonym Prunus gracilis (non Engelm. & Gray, 1845)	
Rosaceae	Rosa	†R. hillae Lesquereux, 1885			A rose leaf morphospecies.	
Rutaceae	†Amyridoxylon	†A. ordinatum Kruse, 1954	Lake Gosiute (Eden Valley)		A citrus relative wood morphospecies.	
Rutaceae	Fagara	†F. biseriata Kruse, 1954	Lake Gosiute (Eden Valley)		A citrus relative wood morphospecies.	
Rutaceae	Fagara	†F. monophylloides Kruse, 1954	Lake Gosiute (Eden Valley)		A citrus relative wood morphospecies.	
Salicaceae	Populus	†P. cinnamomoides (Lesquereux) MacGinitie, 1969	Lake Uinta	Numerous	An Aspen/cottonwood relative. First described as Ceanothus cinnamomoides (1872) P. cinnamomoides synonymy: Carpites newberryana Knowlton, 1926; Cinnamomum scheuchzeri Heer of Lesquereux, 1883; Ficus wyomingiana Lesquereux, 1878; Ilex wyomingensis Lesquereux, 1878; Ilex vyomingensis Lesquereux, 1878; Luehea newberryana (Knowlton) MacGinitie, 1974; Zizyphus cinnamomoides (Lesquereux) Lesquereux, 1878; Zizyphus longifolia Newberry, 1883	
Salicaceae	Populus	†P. wilmattae Cockerell, 1925	Lake Uinta	Numerous	An Aspen/cottonwood relative.	
Salicaceae	Populus	†P. tidwellii Manchester, Judd, & Handley, 2006	Lake Uinta	Numerous	An Aspen/cottonwood relative.	
Salicaceae	†Pseudosalix	†P. handleyi Boucher, Manchester, & Judd, 2003	Lake Uinta (Parachute Creek Member)		A salicaceous species. Includes Potentilla? byrami (1925), Antholithes polemonioides (1929) & Antholithes sp.6 (1934)	
Salicaceae	Salix	†S. cockerelli R.W. Brown, 1934	Lake Unita	4 Specimens	A willow leaf morphospecies.	
Salicaceae	Salix	†S. longiacuminata Knowlton ex R.W. Brown, 1934	Lake Gosiute	1 specimen	A willow leaf morphospecies. Includes Banksia cockerelli (1929)	
Sapindaceae	Allophylus	†A. flexifolia (Lesquereux) MacGinitie, 1969	Lake Gosiute; Lake Uinta	4 Specimens	An Allophylus leaf morphospecies. First named Euonymus flexifolia (1885) A. flexifolia synonymy: Fraxinus flexifolia (Lesquereux) Brown, 1934; Fraxinus petiolata Brown, 1929; Odostemon reynoldsii Hollick, 1929	
Sapindaceae	Athyana	†A. balli (R.W. Brown) MacGinitie, 1969	Lake Unita		A sapindaceous leaf morphotype. Moved from Rhus balli (1934).	
Sapindaceae	"Cardiospermum"	†"C." coloradensis (Knowlton) MacGinitie, 1969	Lake Uninta	Numerous	A possible ballon vine leaf morphospecies. Moved from Lomatia coloradensis (1929) "C." coloradensis synonymy: Lomatia obtusiuscula Cockerell, 1925; Melia coloradensis (Knowlton) Cockerell, 1925; Phyllites coloradensis Knowlton, 1923; Pimelea spatulata Knowlton, 1923	
Sapindaceae	Koelreuteria	†K. allenii (Lesquereux) W.N. Edwards, 1929	Fossil Lake (Fossil Butte Member); Lake Unita (Parachute Creek Member)		A golden rain tree fruit morphospecies. Includes Koelreuteria uiridifluminis seeds	
Sapindaceae	Sapindus	†S. dentoni Lesquereux, 1876	Lake Unita		A soapberry leaf morphotype. Includes Salix media (1872) & Myrica torryi (1929)	
Sapindaceae	Sapindus	†S. obtusifolius Lesquereux, 1874	Lake Unita		A soapberry leaf morphotype. Includes Salix media (1872) & Myrica torryi (1929)	
Sapindaceae	Thouinia	†T. eocenica R.W. Brown, 1929	Lake Unita		A soap berry leaf morphospecies.	
Simaroubaceae	Ailanthus	†A. lesquereuxii Cockerell, 1927			A tree of heaven fruit morphospecies	
Surianaceae	Suriana	†S. inordinata Kruse, 1954	Lake Gosiute (Eden Valley)		A surianaceous wood morphospecies.	
Tetramelaceae	†Parvaspicula	†P. lepidioides (Cockerell) Deanna et al.	Lake Uinta (Parachute Creek Member)	Numerous	A tetramelaceous fruit morphotype. The type species is Clethra (?) lepidioides Cockerell (1925); Also includes Antholithes pendula (1929)	
Tetramelaceae	†Punctaphyllum	†P. glandulosa (Brown) Manchester, Judd, & Kodrul, 2023	Lake Uinta (Parachute Creek Member)	Numerous	A tetramelaceous leaf morphotype. The type species is Cucurbita glandulosa (1929); Includes Aleurites glandulosa (1969) & Dendropanax latens (1974); Also includes the Ficus mississippiensis of Brown (1928)	
Ulmaceae	†Cedrelospermum	†C. nervosum (Newberry) Manchester, 1989	Lake Uinta	Numerous	An ulmaceous species. First named as Planera nervosa (1883) C. nervosum synonymy: Banksites lineatulus Cockerell, 1925; Dalbergia viridiflumensis Knowlton, 1923; Lomatia lineatulus (Cockerell) MacGinitie, 1969; Myrica minuta Knowlton, 1923; Myrica praedrymeja Knowlton, 1923; Rhus myricoides (Knowlton) Brown, 1929; Salix lineara Knowlton, 1923; Zelkova nervosa (Newberry) Brown, 1929	
Vitaceae	Cissus	†C. parrottiaefolia Lesquereux, 1876	Rejected	3 specimens	A grape relative leaf morphospecies. Rejected from formation by Knowlton (1923) due to distinctly different matrix.	
Incertae sedis	†Scalarifructus	†S. coloradensis (Knowlton, 1923)	Lake Unita		First described as a possible Danaea fern leaf. Type species moved from Danaea coloradensis. Considered a possible brassicalean superrosid.	
Incertae sedis	†Uintacarpa	†U. alata Manchester, Judd & Tiffney, 2025	Fossil lake		A Sapindalean fruit of uncertain affinity. Likely belonging to Simaroubaceae or Rutaceae.	

=== Eudicot palynomorphs ===
Genus	Species	Member	Abundance	Notes	Image
†Ailanthipites	†A. berryi Wodehouse, 1933	Lake Uinta (Parachute Creek Member)		An Ailanthus glandulosa-like soapberry family palynomorph.	
†Alni-pollenites	†A. speciipites (Wodehouse) Raatz, 1938	Lake Uinta (Parachute Creek Member)	Numerous	An alder-like palynomorph. first described as Alnus speciipites (1933)	
Betula	†B. claripites Wodehouse, 1933	Lake Uinta (Parachute Creek Member)	3 specimens	A Betula lenta-like birch palynomorph.	
†Caprifoliipites	†C. viridi-fluminis Wodehouse, 1933	Lake Uinta (Parachute Creek Member)	1 specimen	A caprifoliaceous-like palynomorph.	
Carpinus	†C. ancipites Wodehouse, 1933	Lake Uinta (Parachute Creek Member)		A Carpinus-like palynomorph.	
Carya	†C. juxtaporipites (Wodehouse) LaMotte, 1952	Lake Uinta (Parachute Creek Member)	1 specimen	A hickory-like palynomorph. First described as Hicoria juxtaporipites (1933)	
Carya	†C. viridi-fluminipitis (Wodehouse) Wilson & Webster, 1944	Lake Uinta (Parachute Creek Member)	1 specimen	A Carya myristiciformis-like hickory palynomorph. First described as Hicoria viridi-fluminipites (1933)	
Ericipites	†E. brevisulcatus Wodehouse, 1933	Lake Uinta (Parachute Creek Member)	1 specimen	A Calluna vulgaris-like heath family palynomorph.	
Ericipites	†E. longisulcatus Wodehouse, 1933	Lake Uinta (Parachute Creek Member)	2 specimens	A heath family-like palynomorph.	
†Juglanspollenites	†J. nigripites (Wodehouse) Wingate & Nichols, 2001	Lake Uinta (Parachute Creek Member)	1 specimen	A walnut-like palynomorph. First described as Juglans nigripites (1933)	
†Momipites	†M. corylipites (Wodehouse) D.J. Nichols, 1973	Lake Uinta (Parachute Creek Member)	2 specimens	An Engelhardia-like palynomorph. First described as Engelhardia corylipites (1933).	
†Momipites	†M. coryloides Wodehouse, 1933	Lake Uinta (Parachute Creek Member)	Numerous	A Celtis iguanaea-like hackberry palynomorph.	
†Myricipites	†M. dubius Wodehouse, 1933	Lake Uinta (Parachute Creek Member)	1 specimen	A bayberry-like palynomorph.	
Myriophyllum	†M. ambiguipites Wodehouse, 1933	Lake Uinta (Parachute Creek Member)	1 specimen	A Myriophyllum spicatum-like watermillfoil family palynomorph.	
†Rhoipites	†R. bradleyi Wodehouse, 1933	Lake Uinta (Parachute Creek Member)	4 specimens	A Rhus typhina-like cashew family palynomorph.	
Salix	†S. discoloripites Wodehouse, 1933	Lake Uinta (Parachute Creek Member)	Numerous	A Salix discolor and S. fragilis-like willow palynomorph.	
†Talisiipites	†T. fischeri Wodehouse, 1933	Lake Uinta (Parachute Creek Member)	Numerous	A Talisia depressa-like soapberry family palynomorph.	
Tilia	†T. crassipites Wodehouse, 1933	Lake Uinta (Parachute Creek Member)	1 specimen	A Tilia americana-like linden palynomorph.	
Tilia	†T. tetraforaminipites Wodehouse, 1933	Lake Uinta (Parachute Creek Member)	3 specimens	A Tilia americana-like linden palynomorph.	
Tilia	†T. vescipites Wodehouse, 1933	Lake Uinta (Parachute Creek Member)	1 specimens	A Tilia americana-like linden palynomorph.	
†Vitipites	†V. dubius Wodehouse, 1933	Lake Uinta (Parachute Creek Member)	1 specimen	A Vitis vinifera-like grape family palynomorph.	

=== Angiosperms of uncertain affiliation ===
Genus	Species	Member	Abundance	Notes	Image
†Achaenites	†A. cichorioides Knowlton, 1923	Lake Uinta	1 specimen	An achene like structure of unidentified affiliation.	
†Antholithes	†A. dubia R.W. Brown, 1929	Lake Unita	1 specimen	An 8-lobed/petaled flower of unidentified affiliation.	
†Antholithes	†A. improbus Lesquereux, 1883		2 specimens	A flowering structure of unidentified affiliation.	
†Antholithes	†A. vitaciflora R.W. Brown, 1929	Lake Unita	1 specimen	A cluster of possible vitaceous flowers-fruits.	
†Antholithes	†A. winchesteri (Knowlton) MacGinitie, 1969	Lake Unita	1 specimen	A flowering structure of unidentified affiliation. First described as Sambucus? winchesteri (1923)	
†Antholithes	†A. sp 1 R.W. Brown, 1934	Fossil Lake	1 specimen	A possibly cruciferous or orrograceous flower of unidentified affiliation.	
†Antholithes	†A. sp 2 R.W. Brown, 1934	Lake Unita	1 specimen	A flower with many stamens of unidentified affiliation.	
†Antholithes	†A. sp 3 R.W. Brown, 1934	Lake Unita	1 specimen	A malvaceous looking flower of unidentified affiliation.	
†Antholithes	†A. sp 4 R.W. Brown, 1934	Lake Unita	1 specimen	A flower with a superior ovary surrounded by the five-toothed calyx.	
†Antholithes	†A. sp 5 R.W. Brown, 1934	Lake Unita	1 specimen	A flower with tubular receptacle surmounted by a four-parted calyx.	
†Antholithes	†A. sp 7 R.W. Brown, 1934	Fossil Lake	1 specimen	A large flower or a badly distorted leaf of a Nelumbo?	
†Bonanzacarpum	†B. sprungerorum Manchester & Lott, 2019	Lake Uinta (Parachute Creek Member)	Numerous	A eudicot fruit of uncertain phylogenetic placement.	
†Carpites	†C. inquirenda Knowlton, 1923	Lake Unita	1 specimen	A nutlet or fruit of unidentified affiliation.	
†Carpites	†C. newberryanus Knowlton, 1923		3 specimens	A nutlet of unidentified affiliation. First described as Juglans occidentalis nuts (1898). First spelled Carpites newberryana	
†Carpites	†C. viburni Lesquereux, 1878		1 specimen	A seed or nutlet of unidentified affiliation. Includes Carpolithes capsularis (1929)	
†Carpolithus	†C. alabaccus R.W. Brown, 1934	Lake Unita	1 specimen	A winged or membranous fruit of unidentified affiliation.	
†Carpolithus	†C. caryophylloides Knowlton, 1923	Lake Unita		A dry capsular fruit of unidentified affiliation.	
†Carpolithus	†C. cassioides R.W. Brown, 1929	Lake Unita	2 specimens?	A legume like pod of unidentified affiliation.	
†Carpolithus	†C. insectoides R.W. Brown, 1934	Lake Unita	1 specimen	A winged fruit of unidentified affiliation.	
†Carpolithus	†C. palrnites R.W. Brown, 1929	Lake Unita	1 specimen	A palm fruit or husk like fossil of unidentified affiliation.	
†Carpolithus	†C. prunoides R.W. Brown, 1934	Lake Unita	1 specimen	A flattened fruit of unidentified affiliation. First named Carpolithus ellipticus Brown, 1929 (non-Sternberg, 1825)	
†Carpolithus	†C. serratifolius R.W. Brown, 1929	Lake Unita	1 specimen	Branchlet with leaves and fruits of possible salicaceous affinity.	
†Carpolithus	†C. vitaceus R.W. Brown, 1934	Lake Unita	1 specimen	A possibly vitaceous seed of unidentified affiliation.	
†Caulinites	†C. acanthus R.W. Brown, 1929	Lake Unita	1 specimen	A thorny stem of unidentified affiliation.	
†Caulinites	†C. prehensus R.W. Brown, 1929	Lake Unita	1 specimen	A climbing plant tendril of unidentified affiliation.	
†Chaneya	†C. tenuis (Lesquereux) Wang & Manchester, 2000	Lake Gosiute; Lake Unita		A sapindalean flower of uncertain affiliations. Includes Astronium truncatum (1953).	
†Dicotylophyllum	†D. lesquereuxii (Knowlton) J.A. Wolfe & Tanai, 1987		1 specimen	A leaf of uncertain affiliation. First described as Acer indivisum Lesquereux, 1885 (non-Weber, 1852); Moved from Acer lesquereuxii Knowlton, 1898	
†Palibinia	†P. comptonifolia (Brown) Manchester, Judd, & Kodrul, 2023	Lake Uinta (Parachute Creek Member)		A pentapetalean eudicot of uncertain affiliation. Moved from Vauquelinia comptonifolia (1969); Originally named Banksia comptonifolia (1934)	
†Phyllites	†P. ericoides R.W. Brown, 1934	Lake Unita	1 specimen	A thick leaf of unidentified affiliation.	
†Phyllites	†P. fremonti Unger, 1850	Rejected	1 specimen	A leaf of unidentified affiliation. R.W. Brown (1934) rejected due to doubtful locality and lost specimen.	
†Phyllites	†P. glandiferus R.W. Brown, 1934	Lake Unita	1 specimen	An odd-pinnately compound leaf of possible fabaceous affinity.	
†Phyllites	†P. juncoides R.W. Brown, 1929	Lake Unita	1 specimen	A leaf of unidentified affiliation.	
†Phyllites	†P. ouratea R.W. Brown, 1934	Lake Unita	1 specimen	A possibly herbaceous leaf of unidentified affinity.	
†Phyllites	†P. winchesteri Knowlton, 1923	Lake Unita	1 specimen	A leaf of unidentified affiliation.	

=== Plants of uncertain affiliation ===
Genus	Species	Member	Abundance	Notes	Image
†Rhizocaulon	†R. dichotomum R.W. Brown, 1929	Lake Unita	1 specimen	A root of unidentified affiliation. Has a distinct branched fork.	
†Rhizocaulon	†R. natans R.W. Brown, 1929	Lake Unita	1 specimen	A rootlet of unidentified affiliation. small with Trapa natans-like rhizoids.	
