= Fur Formation =

Marine geologial formation in Denmark

- Stratigraphic range: Ypresian; ~55.8–53.5 Ma
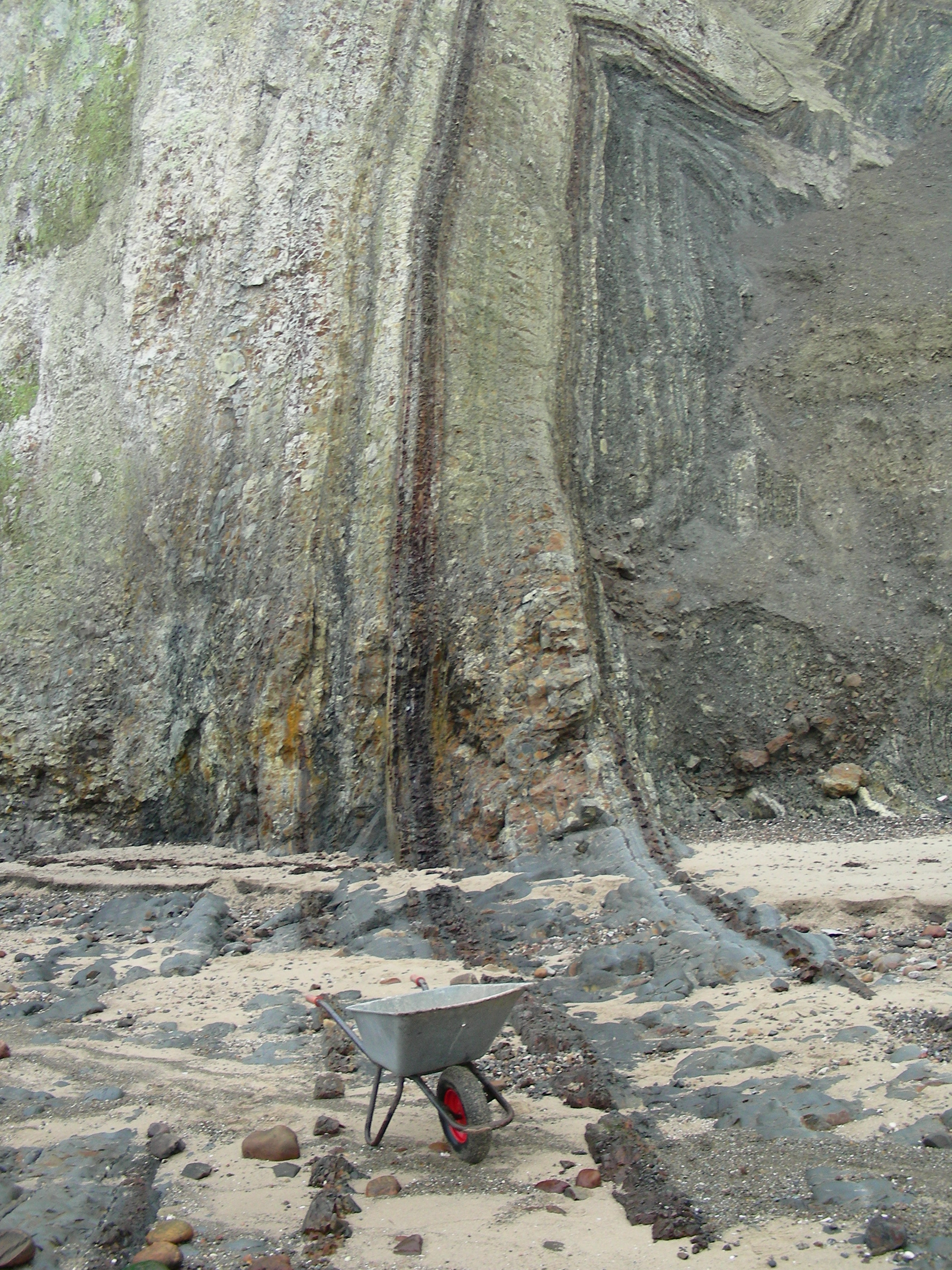
- Coastal cliff on the Danish island Fur - Mo-clay and ash layers
- Type: Geological formation
- Sub-units: See: Members
- Underlies: Røsnes Ler
- Overlies: Holmehus Formation
- Thickness: 60 metres (200 ft)

Lithology
- Primary: Diatomite

Location
- Coordinates: 56°50′16″N 8°57′43″E
- Country: Denmark

Type section
- Named for: Fur
- Fur Formation (Denmark)

UNESCO World Heritage Site
- Official name: Knudeklint
- Part of: The Bony Fish Fossils of the Western Limfjord – Evolution and Climate Adaptation in the Earliest Eocene
- Criteria: Natural: viii
- Reference: 1758
- Inscription: 2026 (48th Session)

The Fur Formation is a marine geological formation of Ypresian (Lower Eocene Epoch, c. 56.0-54.5 Ma) age which crops out in the Limfjord region of northern Denmark from Silstrup via Mors and Fur to Ertebølle, and can be seen in many cliffs and quarries in the area. The Diatomite Cliffs (moler in Danish) became a World Heritage Site in 2026. Fossils found in the Fur Formation are primarily housed at the Fossil and Mo-clay Museum on Mors Island, the Fur Museum on Fur Island, and the Natural History Museum of Denmark (formerly named Geological Museum) in Copenhagen.

== Geology ==
The Fur Formation is a unit of diatomitic sediment approximately 60 meters thick consisting of diatoms and clay minerals with up to 180 layers of volcanic ash. In Danish literature the formation has informally been referred to as the moler (Ler means clay). The diatomite comprises 2/3 opal tests of diatoms and 1/3 clay, interbedded with layers of volcanic ash and a few limestone horizons ('cementstones'), and has exceptionally complete fossil preservation.

It is known for its abundant fossil fish, insects, reptiles, birds and plants. The Fur Formation was deposited just above the Palaeocene-Eocene boundary, about 55 million years ago, and its tropical or sub-tropical flora indicate that the climate after the Paleocene-Eocene Thermal Maximum was moderately warm (approximately 4-8 degrees warmer than today).

Glacial activity has moved and folded all exposed moler in a complicated pattern which permits very precise mapping of glacial movement at the end of the last ice age, and has, due to the ash layers, created a useful pedagogical case for studying tectonics.

=== Members ===
The Fur Formation is divided into two members: The lower Knudeklint Member was named for a location on the island of Fur. The upper Silstrup Member was named for a location in Thy. The stratigraphy exposed at Knudeklint constitutes the unit that containing the Paleocene/Eocene boundary informally named Stolleklint Clay, which grades up into the Fur Formation.

== Paleontological significance ==
Fossils of great diversity and unique preservation exist here, dating to only 10 million years after the 'great extinction' of dinosaurs, ammonites, etc.) This site shows a most unusual, if not unique, diversity of life from both ocean and land, with extremely good preservation of details rarely seen elsewhere, therefore allowing for very reliable reconstruction of palaeobiology. The vast majority of the "Danekræ" fossils (fossils that are considered of national importance and covered by a special law) found since 1990 have been found in the Mo-clay area.

=== Birds ===
The Fur Formation preserves the earliest diverse Paleogene bird fauna known, with over 30 species, including some near complete, some preserved in 3-D, and some excellent bird-fossils (even with feathers and chromatine). Most are the earliest known representatives of their orders (e.g. Trogons, Swifts, Ibises) and all are terrestrial birds.

Genus	Species	Higher taxon	Notes	Images
Chascacocolius	C. oscitans?	Sandcoleidae	Only known from one wing	
Eocypselus	E. vincenti	Apodiformes	Mainly known from the London Clay	
Galliformes indet.	Unapplicable	Galloanserae	Known from foot imprints distinct from all other Eocene galliforms	
Lithornis	L. vulturinus	Lithornithidae	First complete lithornithid specimen known	Life restoration of Lithornis
Mopsitta	M. tanta	Psittaciformes incertae sedis?	Formerly the largest fossil parrot known, however it may actually be synonymous with the ibis Rhynchaeites	
Morsoravis	M. sedilis	Morsoravidae	Formerly classed as a charadriiform before being reclassified as a basal member of Psittacopasseres	
Halcyornithidae indet.	Unapplicable	Eufalconimorphae	Only known from one humerus	
Pellornis	P. mikkelseni	Messelornithidae	Limb specialisation indicates it was likely cursorial, redescribed from several complete skeletons which support it being a crown-gruiform	
Scandiavis	S. mikkelseni	Charadriiformes?	Likely a basal member due to features of the postcrania	
Septencoracias	S. morsensis	Coraciiformes	One of the earliest rollers, preserved with fish in its stomach	Restoration
Septentrogon	S. madseni	Trogonidae	Earliest trogon known	

=== Reptiles ===
Several fossil sea turtles are known from the Fur Formation. In one of them, a large leatherback turtle (Eosphargis breineri) remains of soft tissue and skin pigmentation have been recovered A number of well-preserved turtle specimens have been recovered from the formation, two of which have been recognized to be a completely new species of the genus Tasbacka. Sea snakes are also known from the formation.

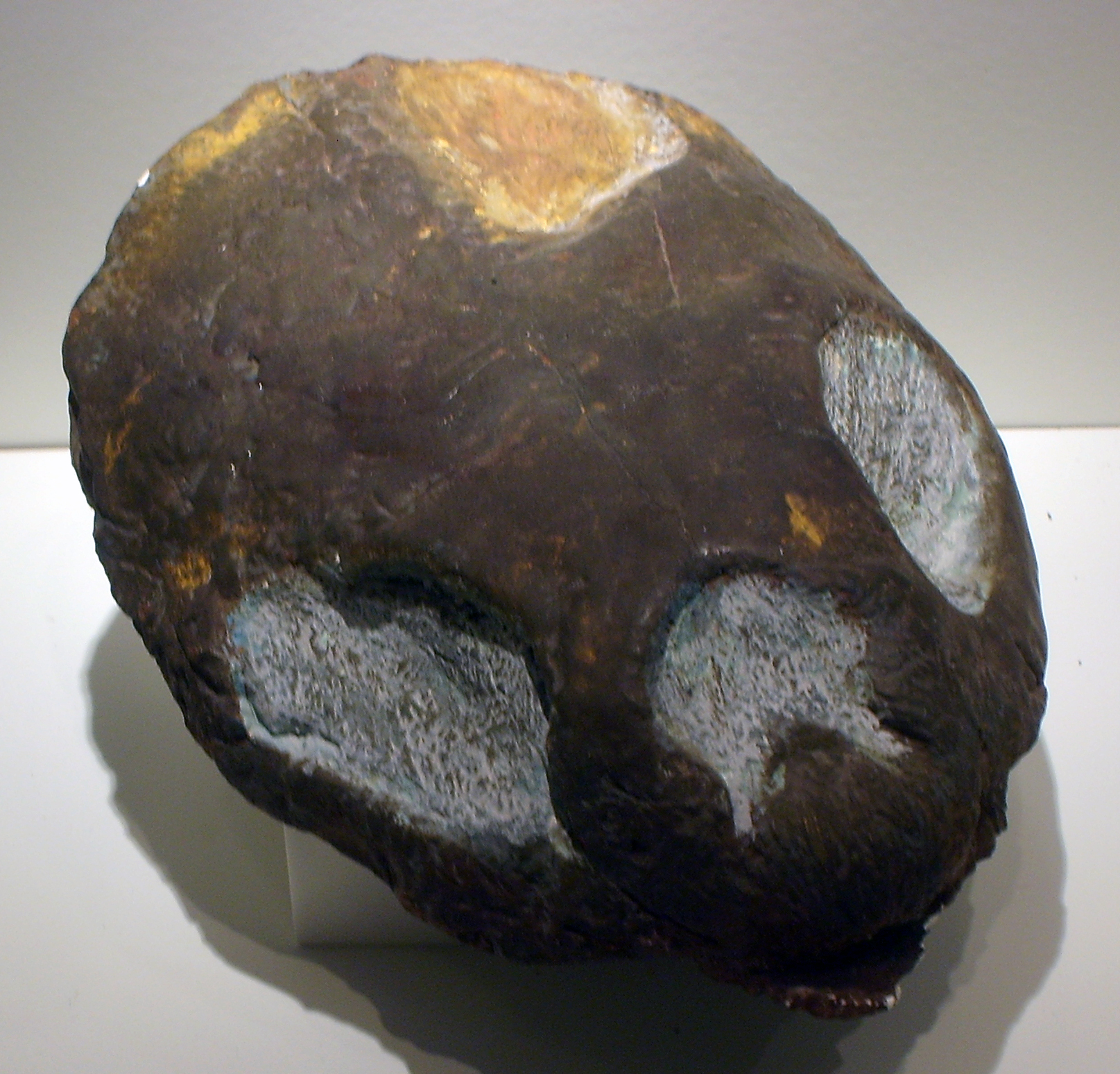
Leatherback turtle Eosphargis breineri skull cast, at Geological Museum in Copenhagen.

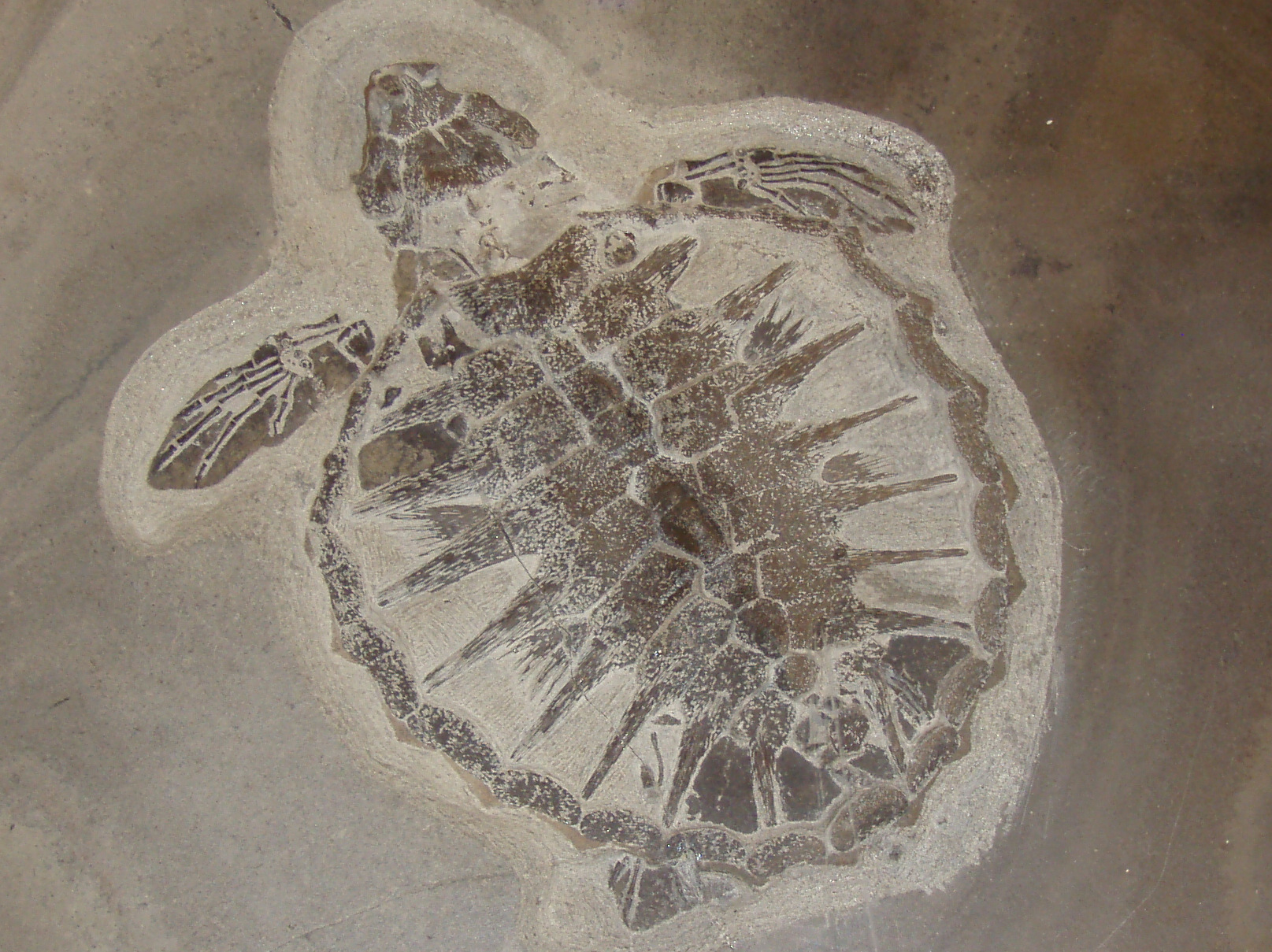
Sea turtle Tasbacka danica Complete unique fossil baby sea turtle. Length 10.5 cm

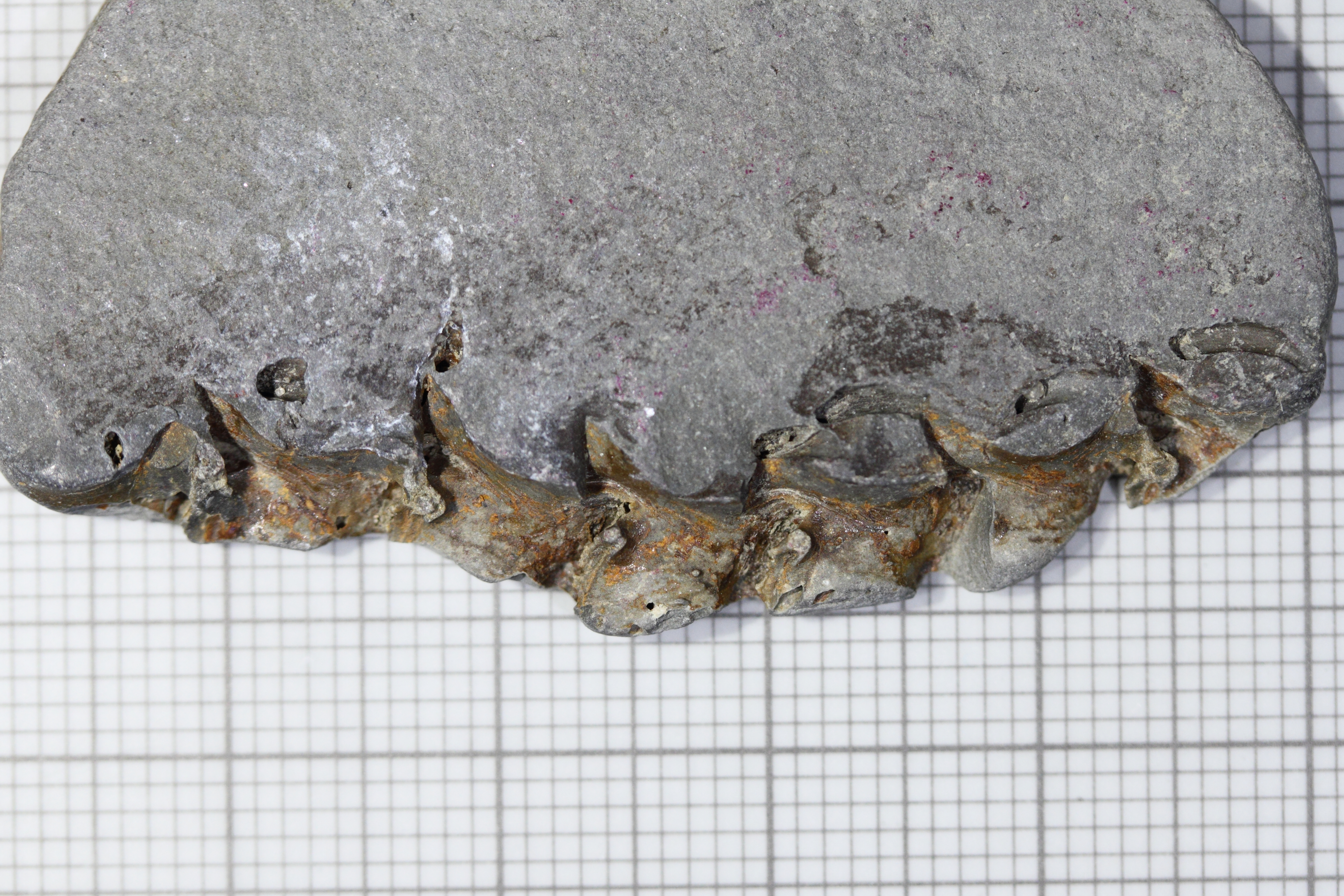
Sea snake Palaeophis sp. in Early Eocene Stolleklint Clay

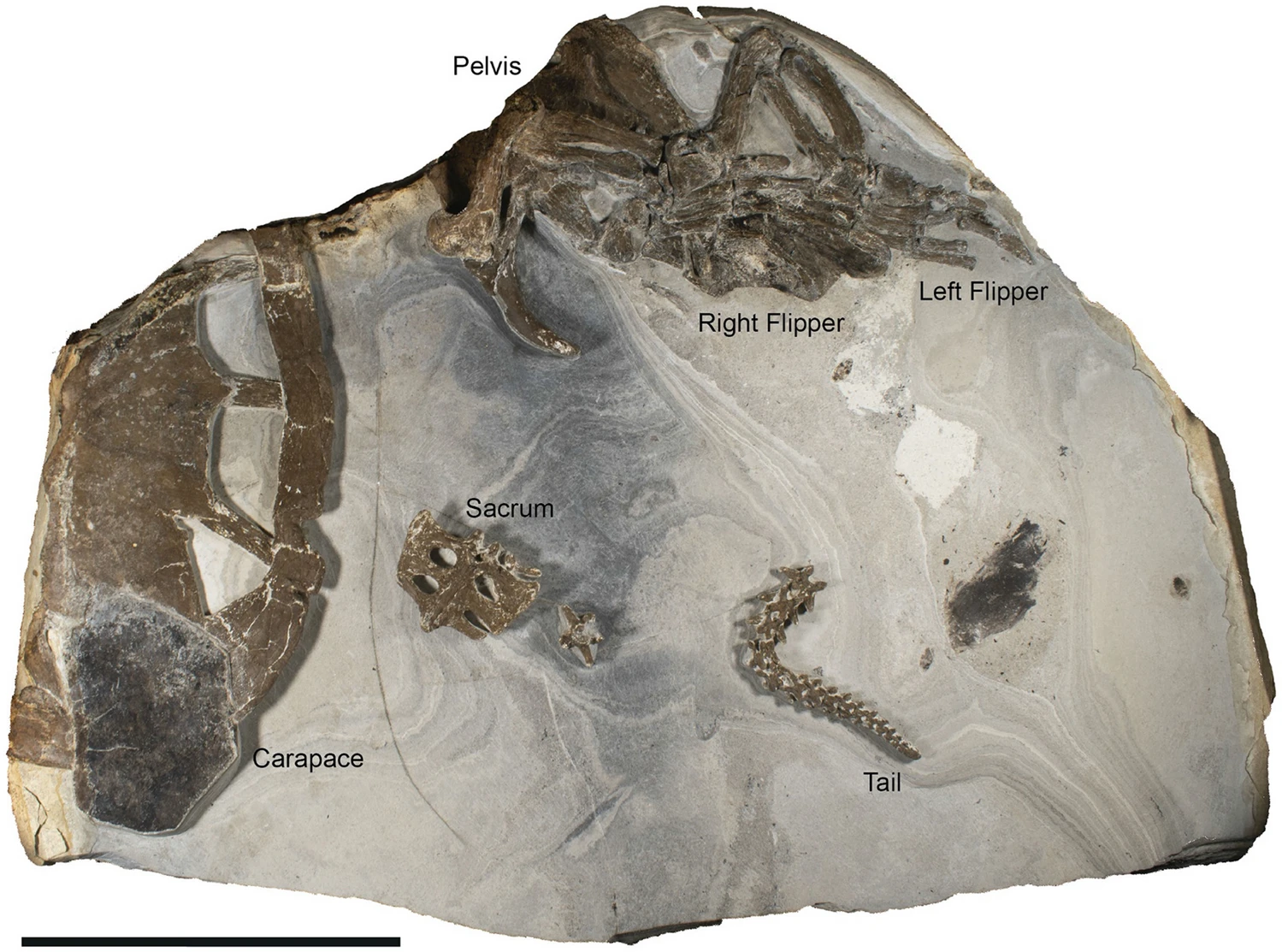
pan-Cheloniidae sp. (specimen DK 807, collected in 2013)
- Palaeophis (Sea snake)
- Eosphargis brenieri (Leatherback turtle)
- Cheloniidae and pan-Cheloniidae

- †Puppigerus

- Glarichelys
- Tasbacka

=== Fish ===
Fossils of large oceanic teleostean fauna are known from the Fur Formation, possibly including earliest truly deepwater fish, a 'whale-fish'; earliest members of many living families and Tertiary diversity preserved as complete skeletons; including some large and complete specimens (two 'bonytongues', one tarpon).

The following taxa are known:

Genus	Species	Location	Member	Notes	Images
?Analectis	?A. sp.		Fur	A turkmenid lampriform.	
?Antigonia	?A. sp.		Fur	A boarfish.	
Archaeozeus	A. skamolensis		Fur	An archaeozeid zeiform.	
?Arius	?A. sp.		Fur	A sea catfish.	
Atheriniformes indet.			Fur	An atheriniform.	
Aulostomoidea indet.			Fur	An aulostomoid.	
Brychaetoides	B. greenwoodi		Fur	A bonytongue.	
cf. Brychaetus	B. sp.		Stolle Klint	A bonytongue.	
Butyrumichthys	B. henricii		Fur	A medusafish.	
Euzaphlegidae indet.			Fur	A euzaphlegid.	
Exellia	E. sp.		Fur	An exelliid percomorph.	
Furichthys	F. fieldsoei		Fur	A bonytongue.	
Heterosteoglossum	H. foreyi		Fur, Stolle Klint	A bonytongue.	
Holosteus	H. sp.		Fur	A barracudina.	
Megalopidae indet.			Fur	A tarpon.	
Mene	M. sp.		Fur	A moonfish.	
Moclaybalistes	M. danekrus		Fur	A moclaybalistid tetraodontiform.	
Muraenidae indet.			Fur	A moray eel.	
Osteoglossiformes indet.			Fur	A small-sized osteoglossiform.	
Palaeocentrotus	P. boeggildi		Fur	A palaeocentrotid lampriform.	
Palaeorhynchidae indet.			Fur	A billfish.	
?Percopsiformes indet.			Fur	A potential percopsiform.	
Polyspinatus	P. fluere		Fur	A beardfish.	
Protozeus	P. kuehnei		Fur	A protozeid zeiform.	
Rhamphosus	R. sp.		Fur	A syngnathiform.	
Rhinocephalus	R. sp.		Fur	A hake.	
?Rondeletia	?R. sp.		Fur	A whalefish, possibly a redmouth whalefish.	
?Salmonidae indet.			Fur	A potential salmonid.	
?Sardinella	?S. sp.		Fur	A clupeid.	
?Scorpaeniformes indet.			Fur	A potential scorpaeniform.	
Surlykus	S. longigracilis		Fur	An argentiniform, the most common fish in the Mo-Clay.	
?Vomeropsis	?V. sp.		Fur	A carangid.	
Xosteoglossid	X. rebeccae		Stolle Klint	A bonytongue.	

=== Insects ===
Fauna from land, over 200 species, many are oldest of their families; many with colour spots and eye lenses, some preservation with stridulation (sound) apparatus in grasshoppers, and migratory moth mass mortality.

Genus	Species	Higher taxon	Notes	Images
Apachyus	A. madseni	Apachyidae	First fossil apachyid	The extant A. peterseni
Cephalallus	C. vitalii	Spondylidinae	First longhorn beetle from the formation	
Cryptocheilus	C. leleji	Pepsini	Earliest pompillid wasp known	The extant C. infumatus
Danoberotha	D. verkleijorum	Berothidae	First berothid from the formation	
Danochrysa	D. madseni	Chrysopidae		
Danolestes	D. moelleri	Lestoidea	A member of Lestoidea of uncertain affinities.	
Danomantispa	D. frandseni	Mantispidae	Intermediate between Drepanicinae and Mantispinae	
Eodysagrion	E. mikkelseni	Dysagrionidae (Odonata)	Member of its own subfamily, Eodysagrioninae	
Eosassula	E. szwedoi	Nogodinidae	One of the few nogodinid fossils	
Furagrion	F. jutlandicus	Zygoptera	Bears all wing venation characters of cephalozygopterans, but has a head similar to zygopterans	
Furochrysa	F. alisae	Chrysopidae	Distinguished by a long crossvein	
Mesypochrysa	M. nielseni	Chrysopidae	Latest record of the Mesozoic genus Mesypochrysa	
Pachycondyla	P. rebekkae	Ponerinae	One of the earliest fossil ants in an extant genus at the time of description	A worker of the extant P. harpax
Palaeopsychops	P. quadratus	Polystoechotidae	Bears stripes along its crossveins	Holotype of P. timmi from the Klondike Mountain Formation
Parabaissaeshna	P. ejerslevense	Aeshnidae	Resembles the Mesozoic Baissaeshna	
Pseudotettigonia	P. amoena	Tettigoniidae	Preserves a complete stridulatory organ, with the structure of the organ suggesting that it was able to hear low ultrasound	
Primorilestes	P. madseni	Dysagrionidae (Odonata)		
Protheristria	P. roldae	Mantispidae	In the same subfamily as the other mantisfly known from the formation, but otherwise unrelated	
Rhantus	R. villumi	Dytiscidae	Oldest species in the genus	The extant Rhantus elisabethae
Stephenbrooksia	S. multifurcata	Chrysopidae	Bears unusual hind wing venation	
Stolleagrion	S. foghnielseni	Cephalozygoptera (Odonata)	First odonate known from the early Ypresian	
Triachrysa	T. rusti	Chrysopidae	Has three series of crossveins in its wings, alongside several unrelated genera	

=== Crustacea ===
Extraordinary cirripeds (barnacles), and the only fossil shrimps from Denmark.

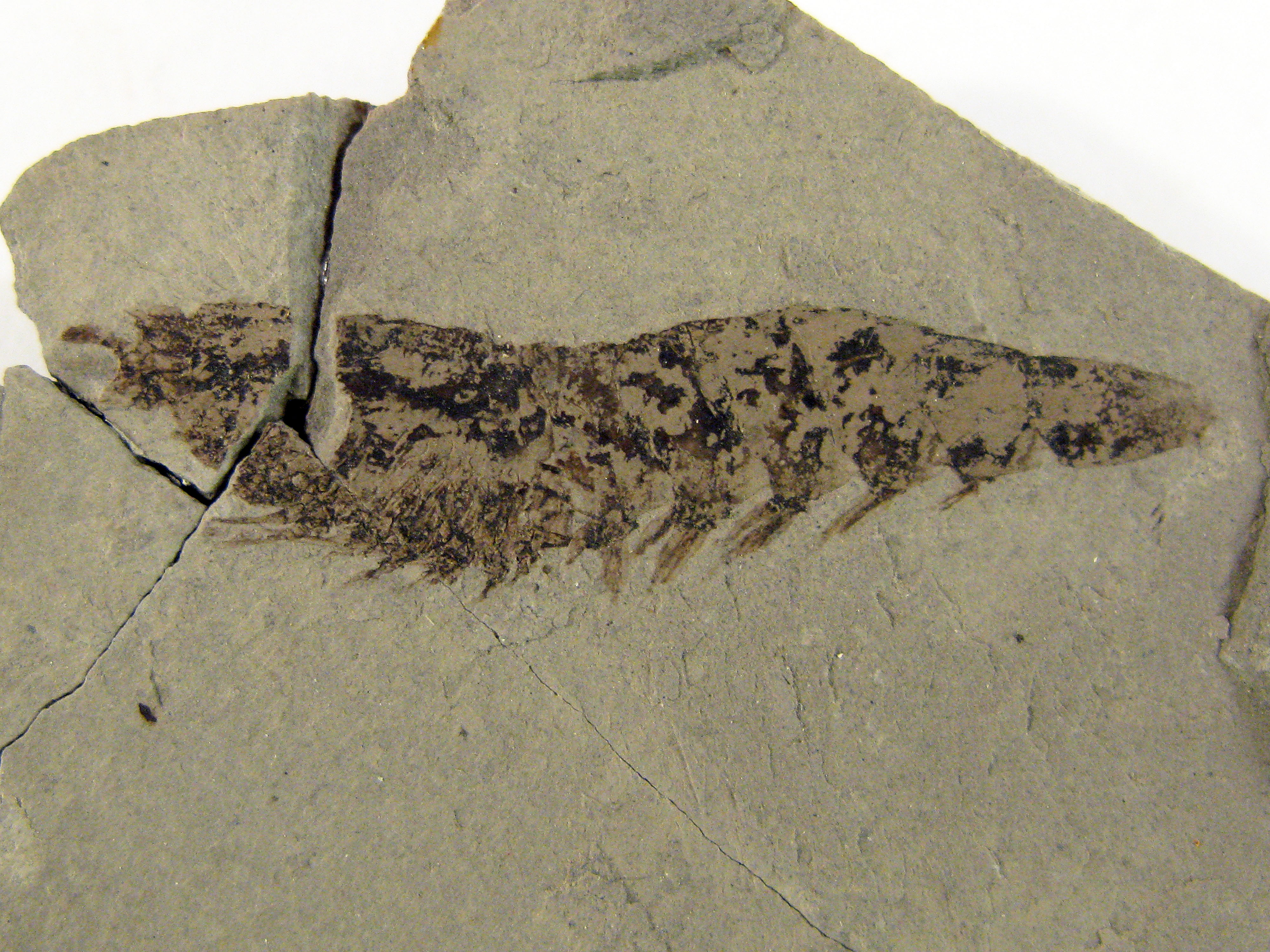
Shrimp Penaeus hamleti, Stolleklint Clay

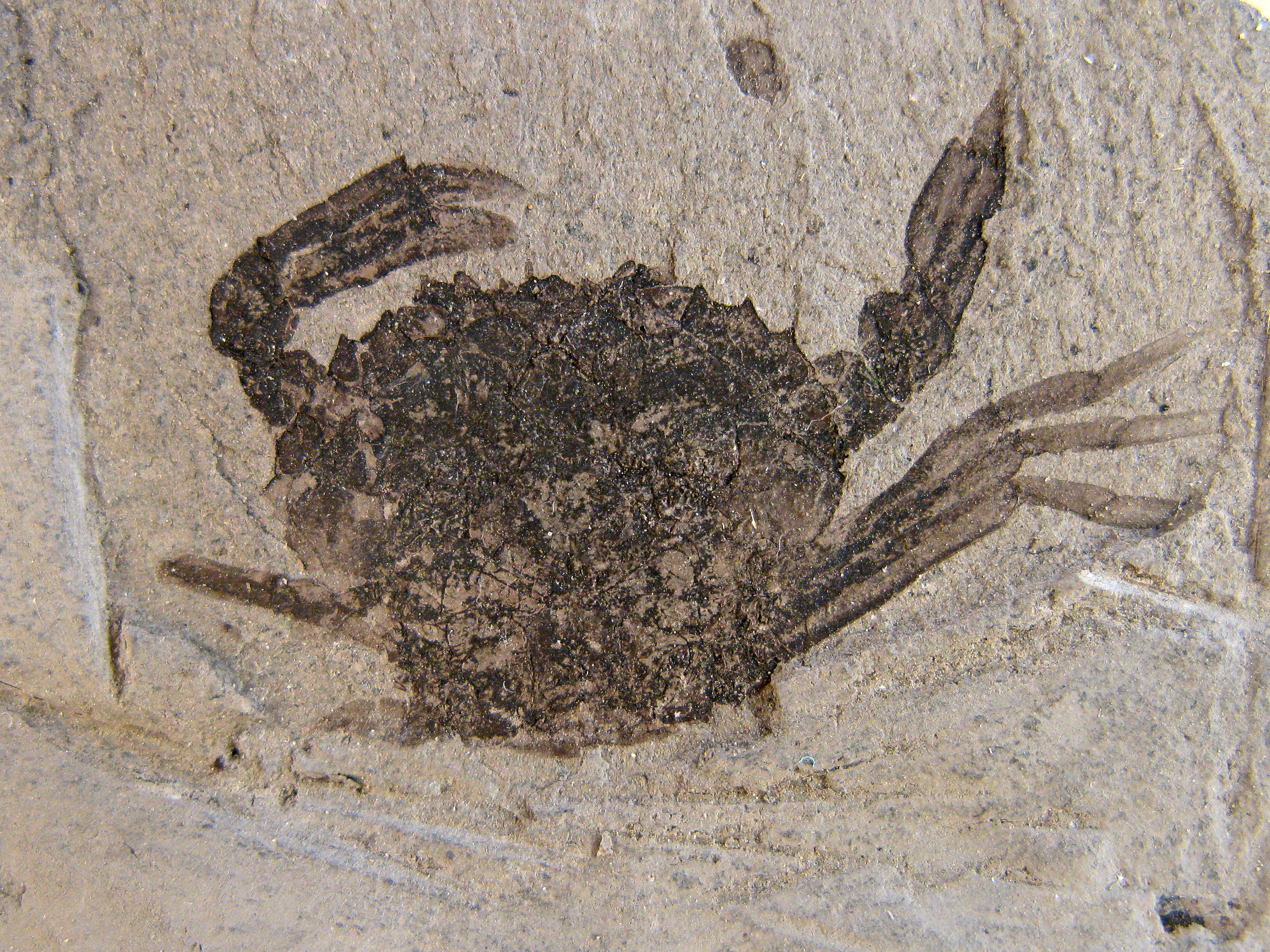
Crab Portofuria enigmatica, Stolleklint Clay

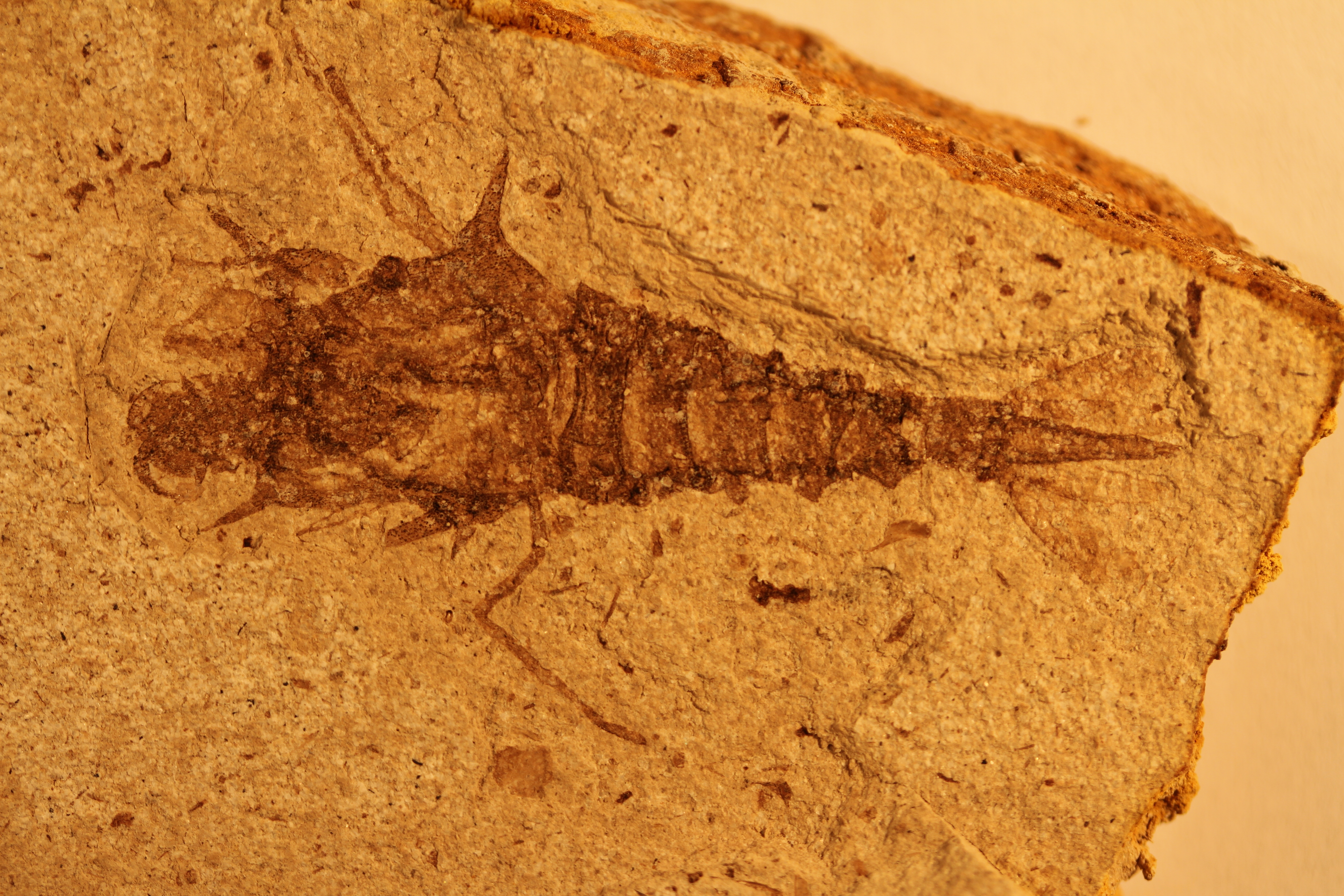
Shrimp Morscrangon acutus

=== Molluscs ===
- Gari sp.
- Mytilus sp.
- Nucula sp.
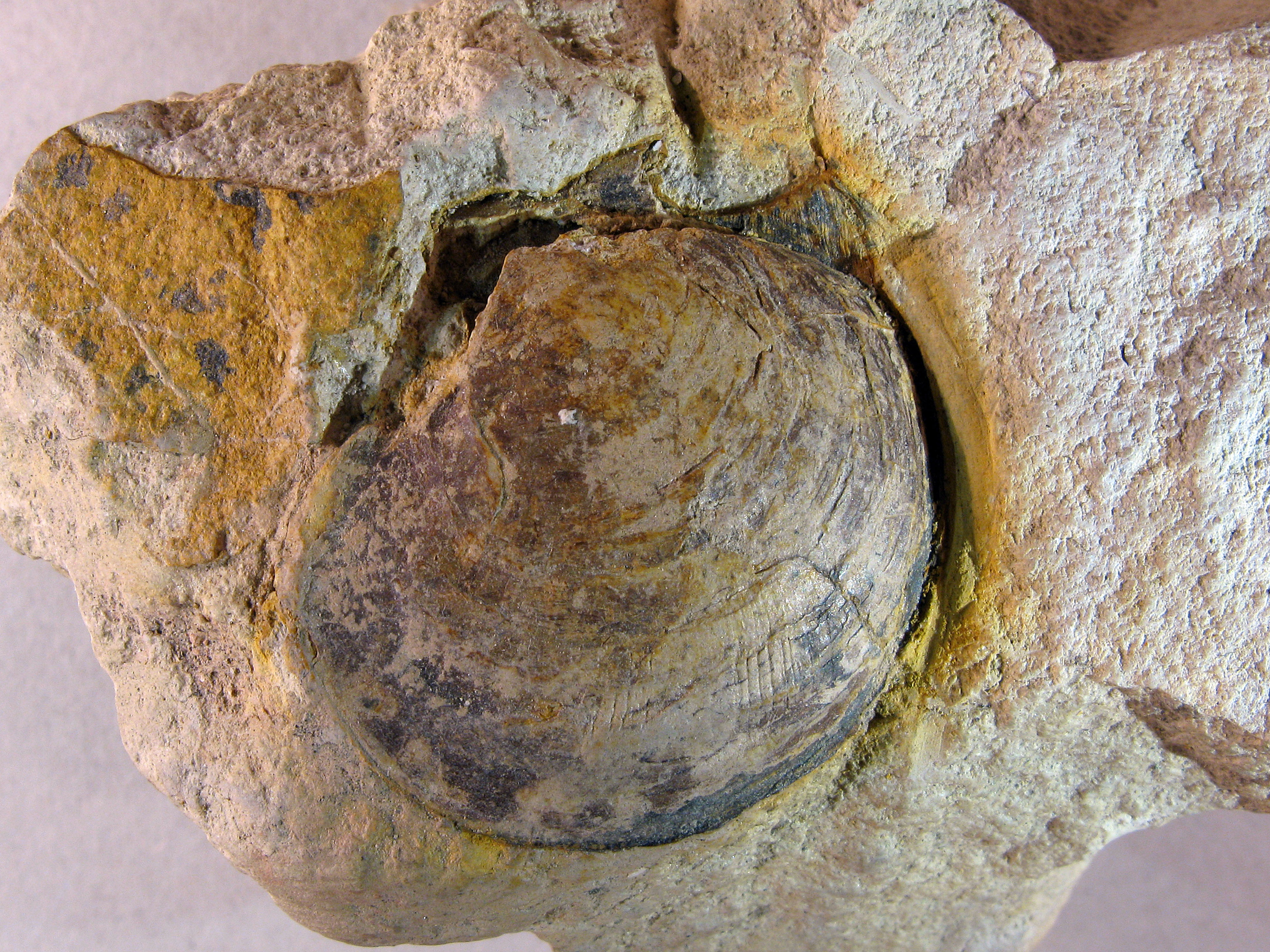
Mussel at Geological Museum in Copenhagen

=== Land plants ===
Some members of the 'Arcto-Tertiary flora'; some with cuticle preservation and some flowers preserved. Large silicified trunks (up to 9 m) of redwood, and some very soft wood preserved. Some trunks with mussels and barnacles attached. Many seeds and fruits.

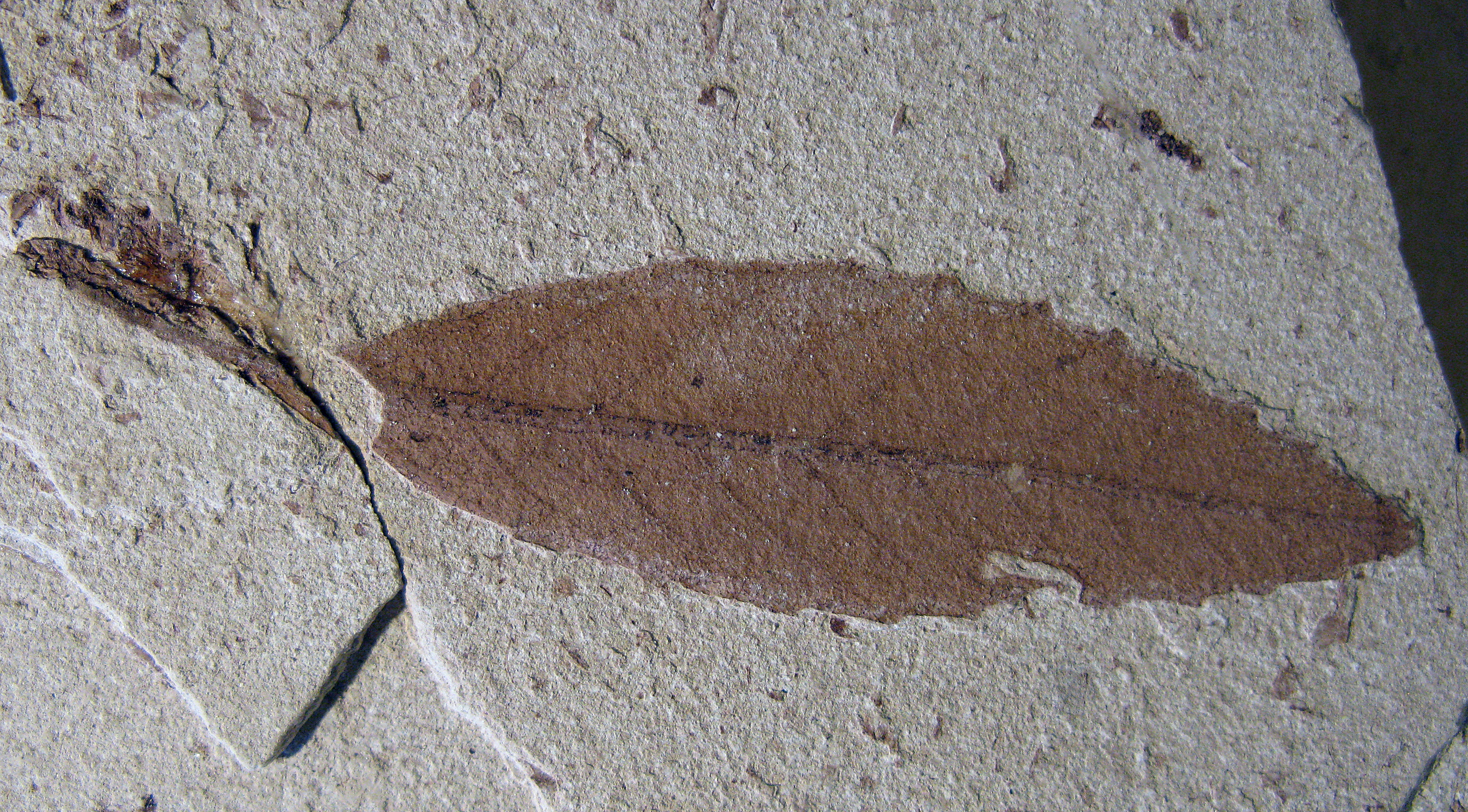
Unidentified leaf

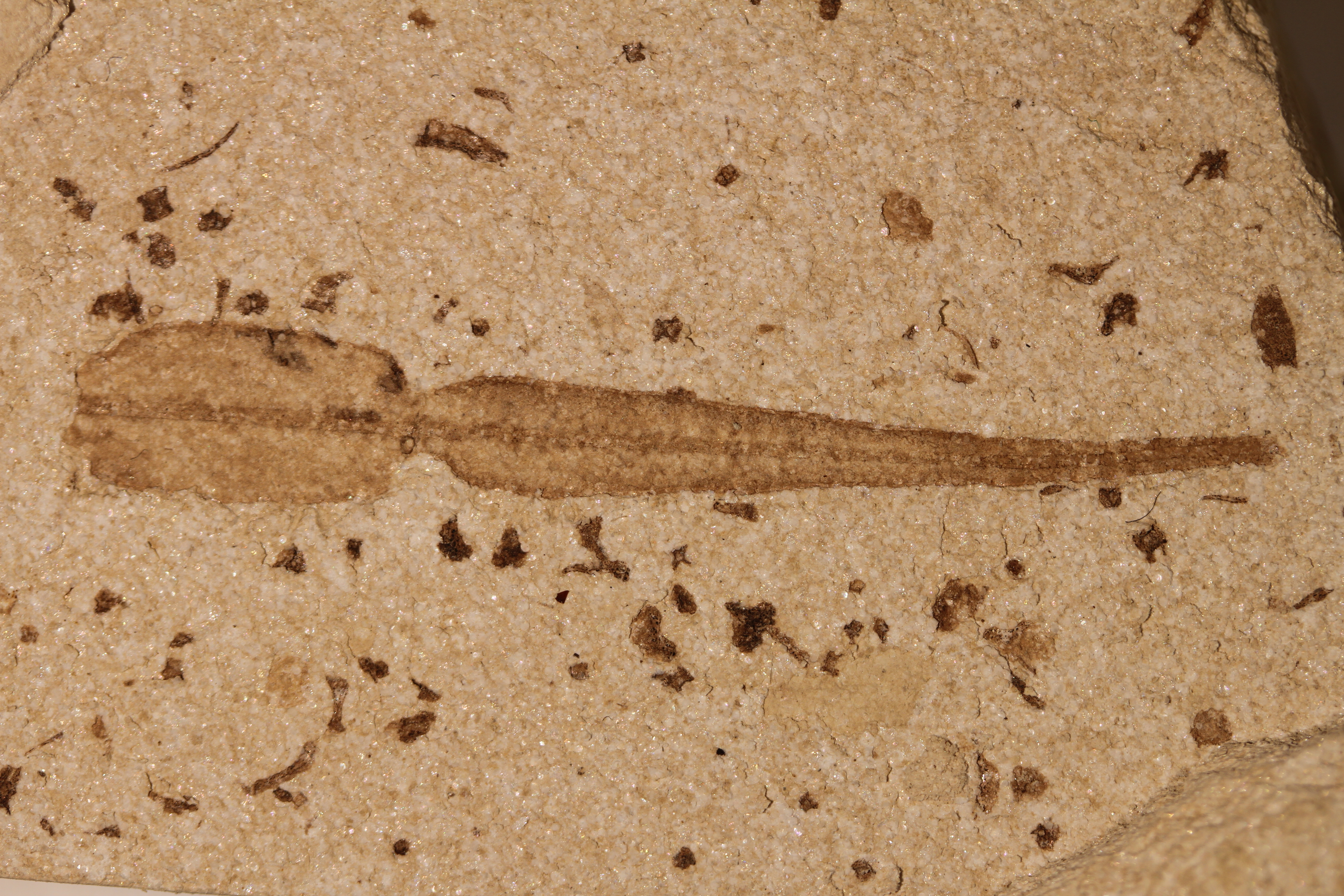
Unidentified leaf

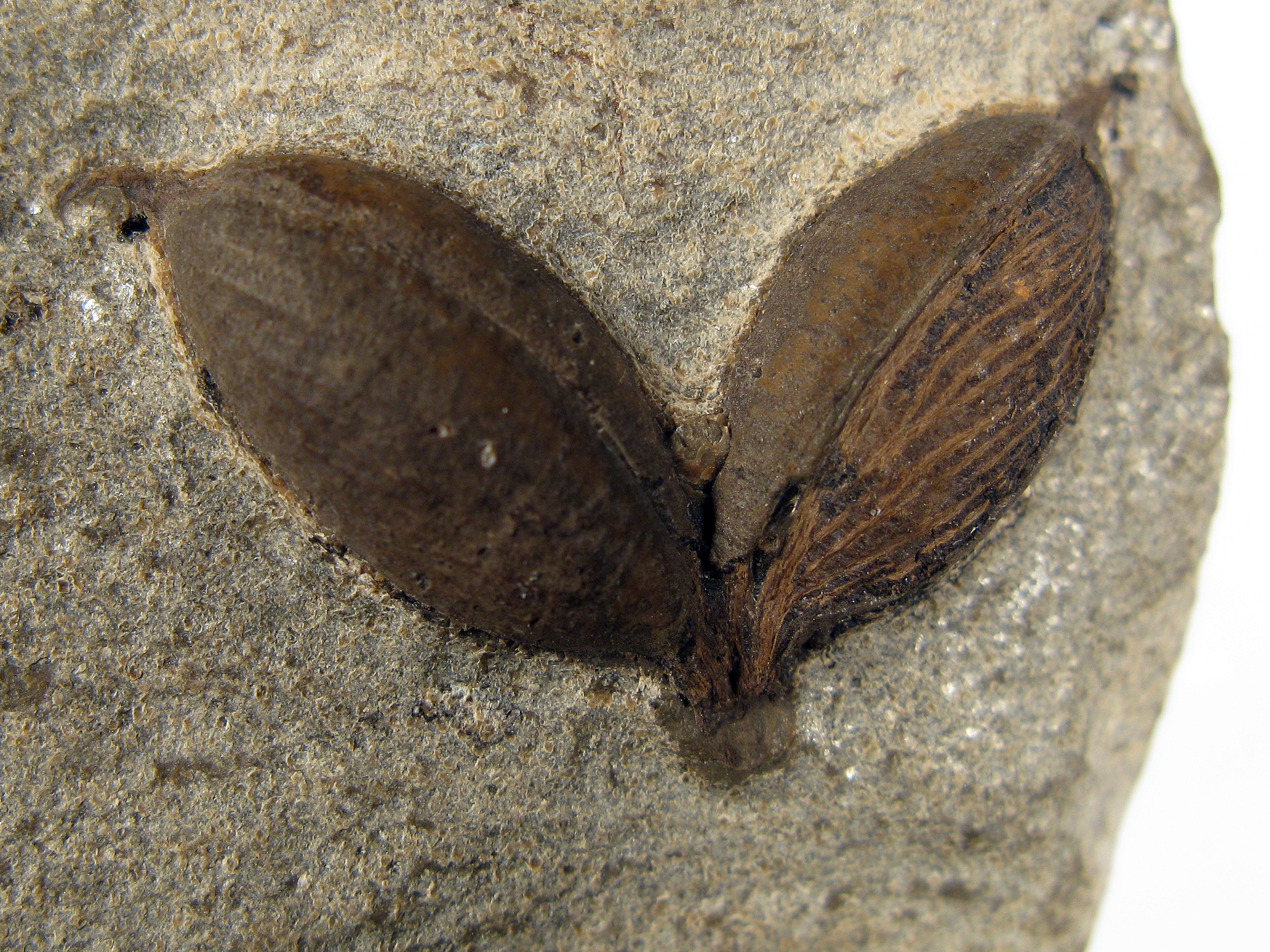
Jenkinsella sp. seeds

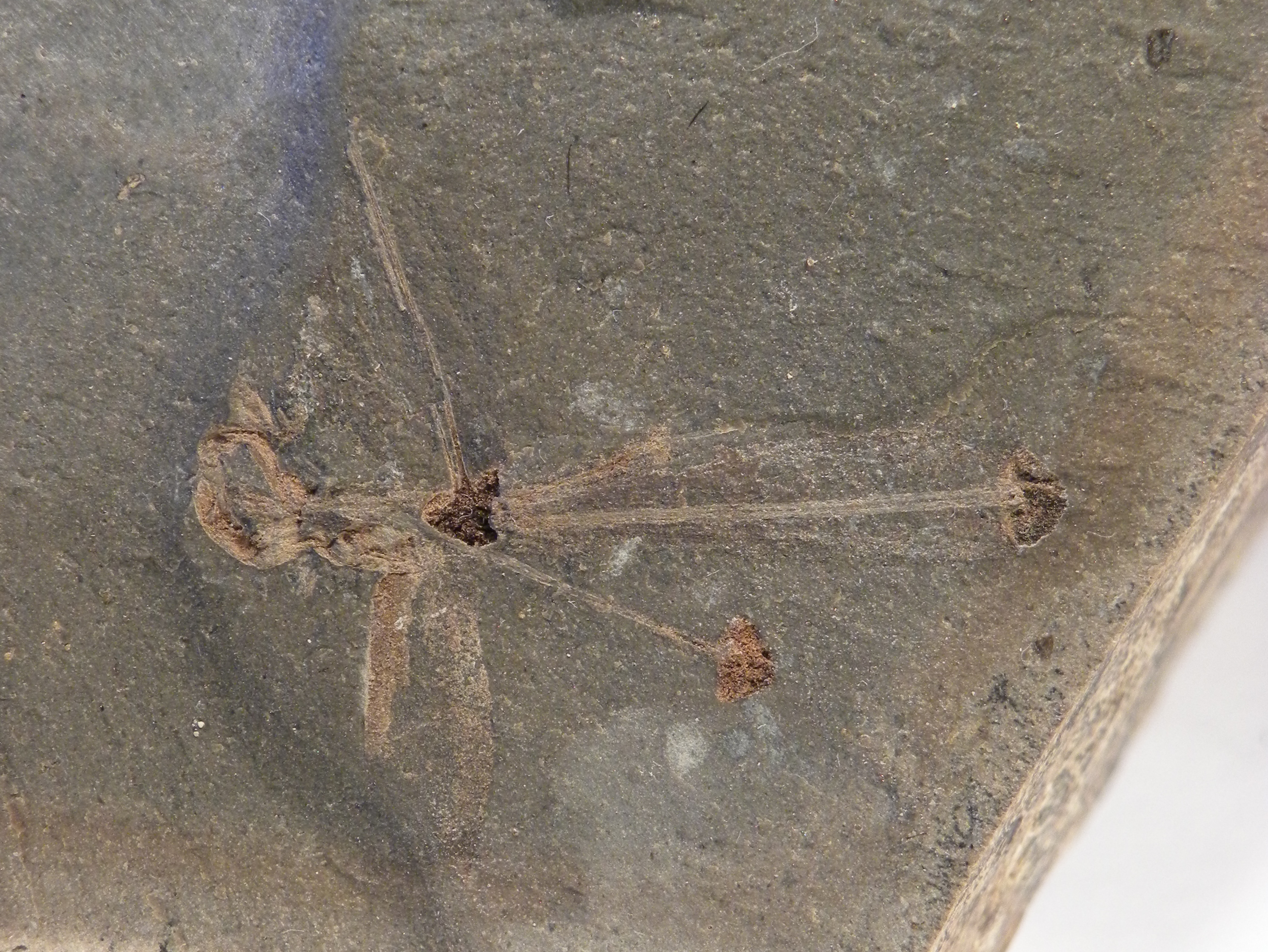
unidentified flower.

=== Diatoms ===
Great diversity of unicellular, marine algae with siliceous (opal) tests, 130 species.

== Ash layers ==
More than 200 layers of volcanic ash of predominantly basaltic composition have been found within the Mo-clay of the Fur Formation. 179 of the most prominent ash layers have been numbered. Comparison with volcanic ash layers in oil wells in the North Sea indicates that the Mo-clay is coeval with the Sele Formation and Balder Formation in the North Sea. The ash layers have also been found at other sites in Denmark, England, Austria and the Bay of Biscay.

The total eruption volume of this series have been calculated as 21,000 km^{3}, which occurred in 600,000 years. The most powerful single eruption of this series took place 54.0 million years ago (Ma) and ejected ca. 1,200 km^{3} of ash material, which makes it one of the largest basaltic pyroclastic eruptions in geological history.

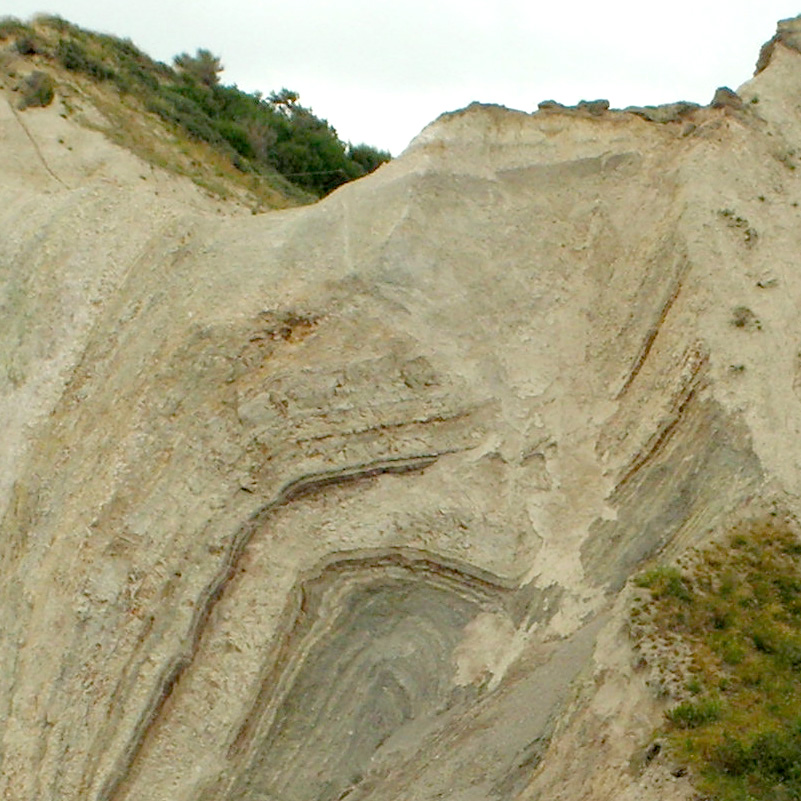
Image showing the distinct geological layers.

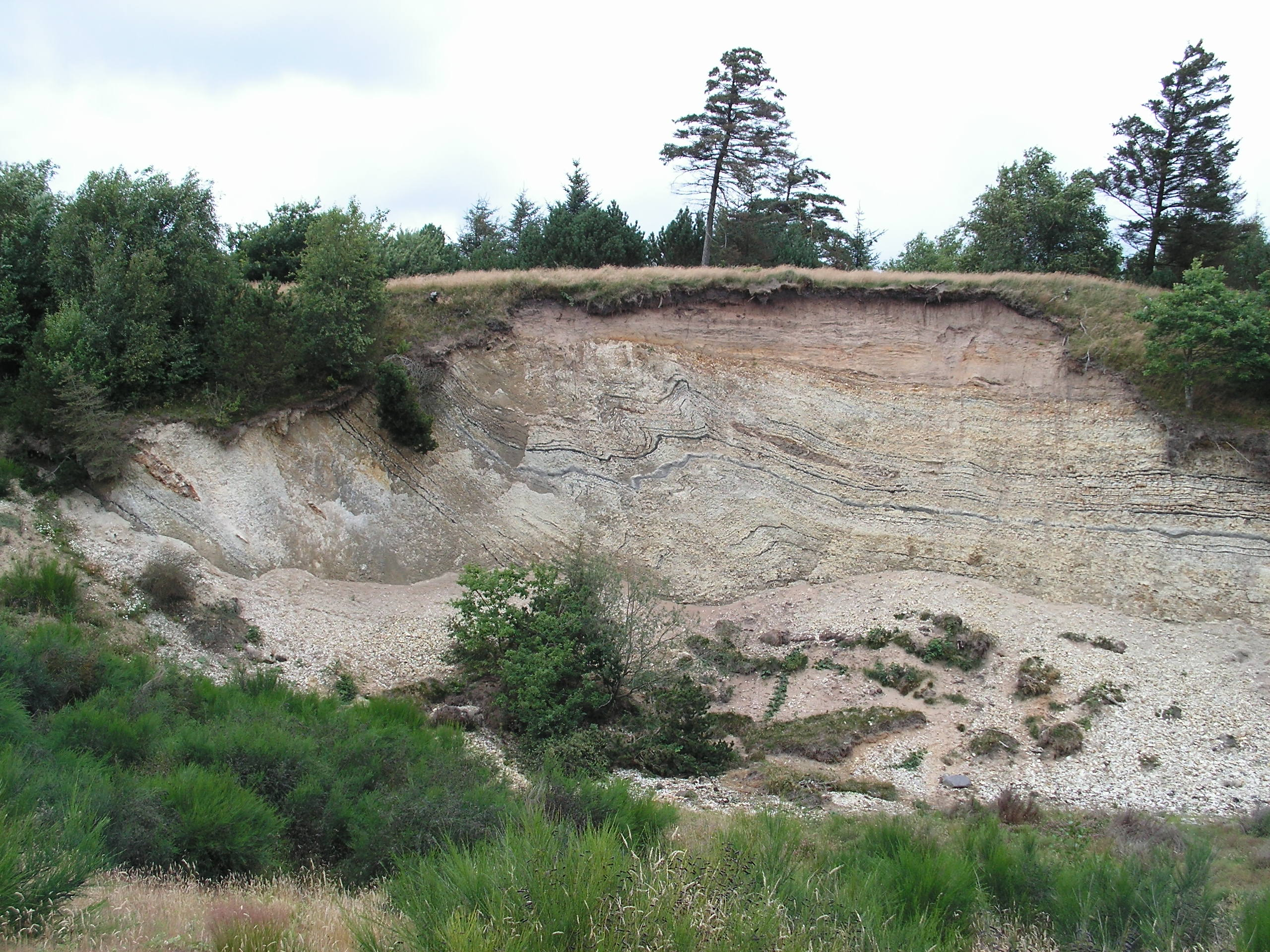
An inland location.

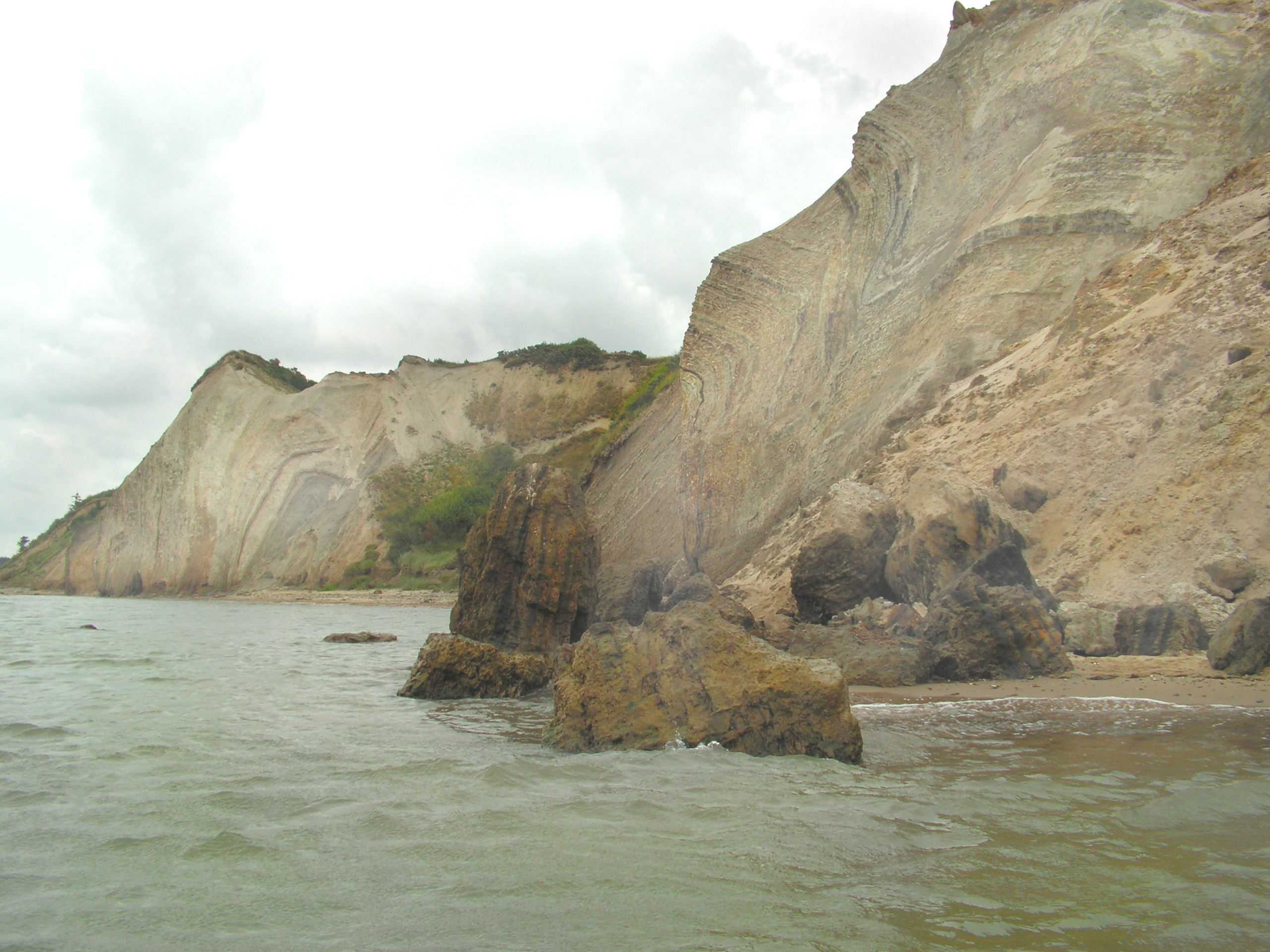
These cliffs of Fur have been a rich source of fossils.

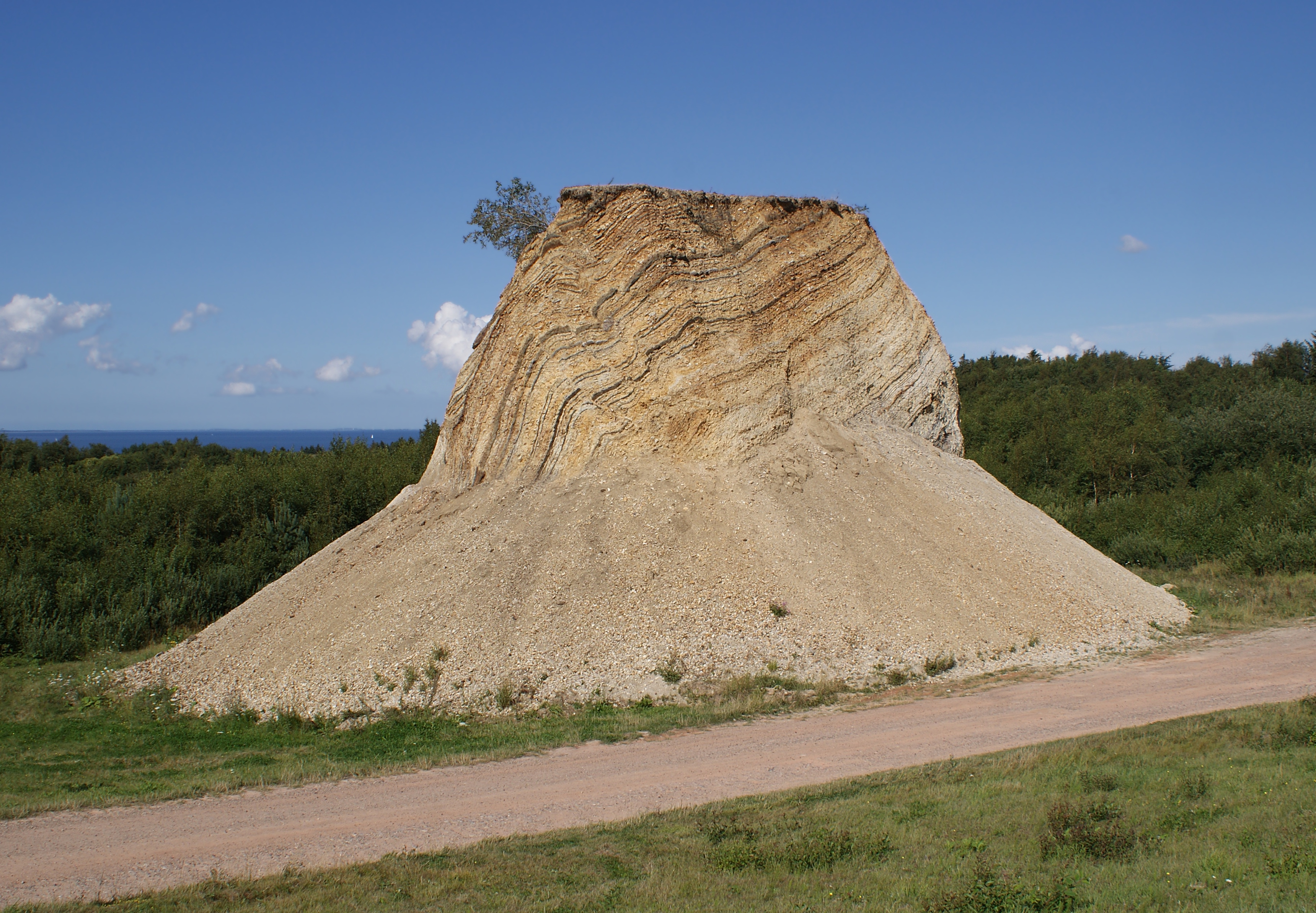
Mo-clay with layers of volcanic ash

== See also ==
- List of fossiliferous stratigraphic units in Denmark
