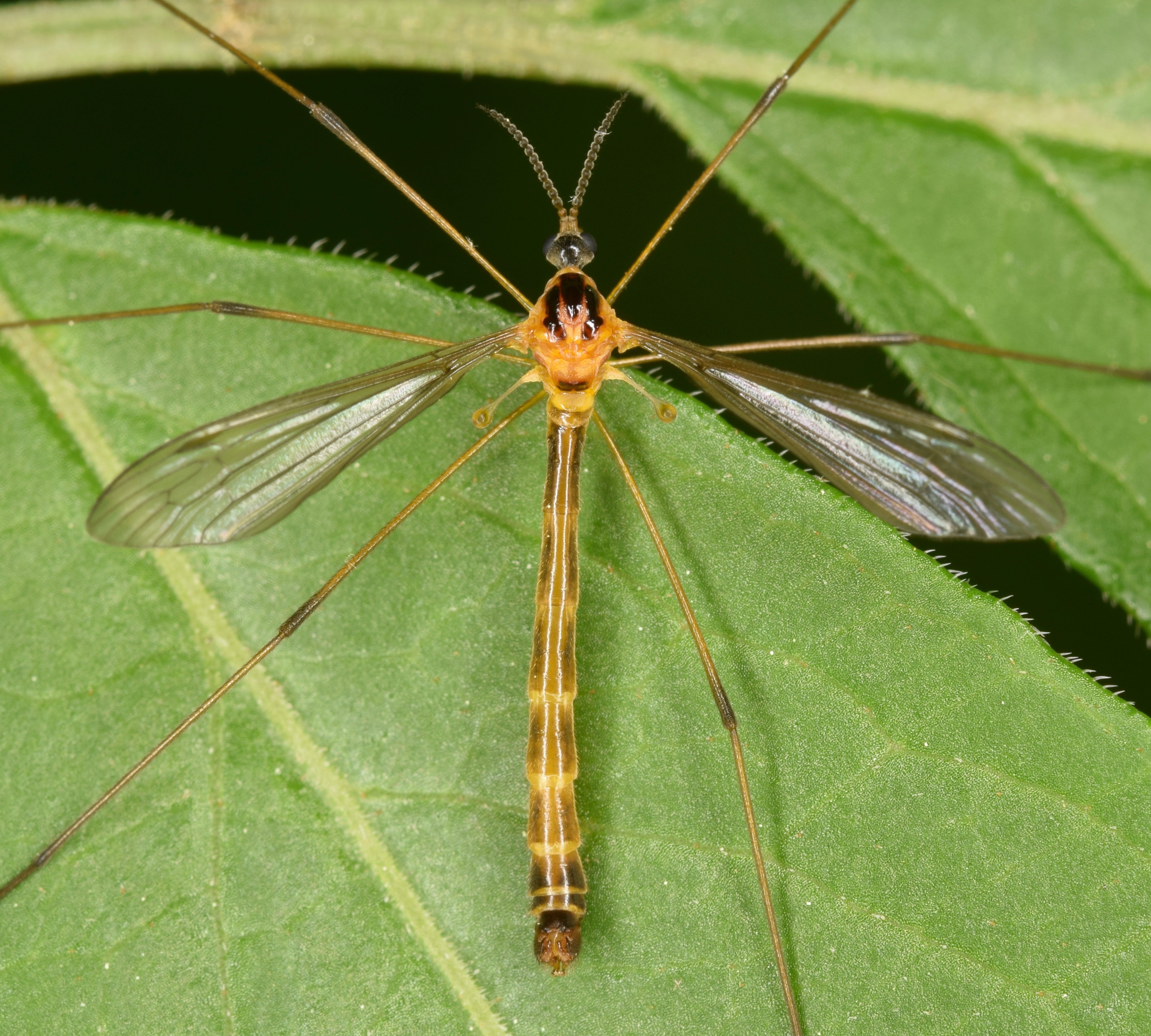

Scientific classification
- Domain: Eukaryota
- Kingdom: Animalia
- Phylum: Arthropoda
- Class: Insecta
- Order: Diptera
- Family: Cylindrotomidae
- Genus: Liogma
- Species: L. nodicornis

Binomial name
- Liogma nodicornis (Osten Sacken, 1865)

Synonyms
- Liogma flaveola Alexander, 1919; Triogma nodicornis Osten Sacken, 1865

= Liogma nodicornis =

Species of fly

Liogma nodicornis is a species of cylindrotomid crane flies, insects in the family Cylindrotomidae.
