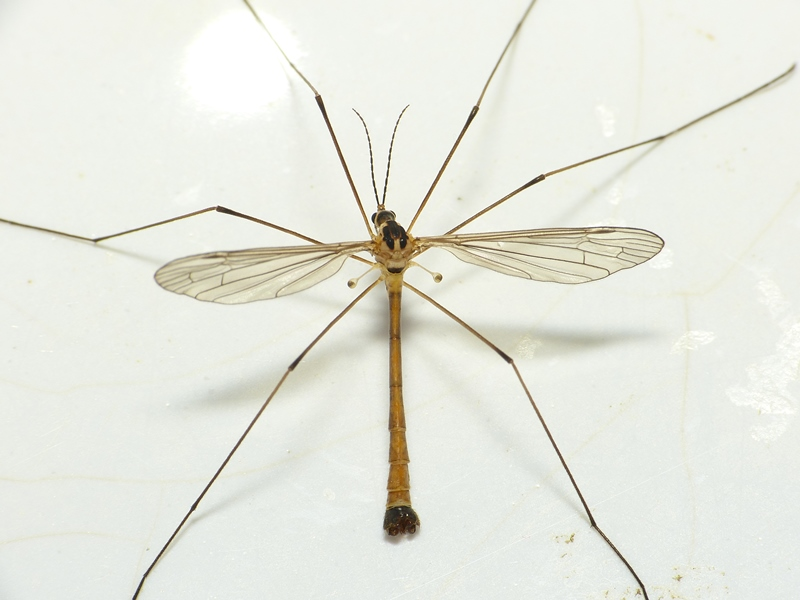
- Cylindrotoma distinctissima

Scientific classification
- Kingdom: Animalia
- Phylum: Arthropoda
- Class: Insecta
- Order: Diptera
- Infraorder: Tipulomorpha
- Superfamily: Tipuloidea
- Family: Cylindrotomidae
- Subfamily: Cylindrotominae van der Wulp, 1877

Genera
- See text

= Cylindrotominae =

Subfamily of flies

The Cylindrotominae are one of two subfamilies within the family Cylindrotomidae, comprising approximately 70 phytophagous species. The majority of these develop on or within aquatic plants, such as mosses. Members of this subfamily typically have elongated bodies relative to their wing size.

== Genera ==
- Cylindrotoma Macquart, 1834
- Diogma Edwards, 1938
- Liogma Osten Sacken, 1869
- Phalacrocera Schiner, 1863
- Triogma Schiner, 1863
