= Stibadocera =

Scientific classification
- Kingdom: Animalia
- Phylum: Arthropoda
- Clade: Pancrustacea
- Class: Insecta
- Order: Diptera
- Family: Cylindrotomidae
- Subfamily: Stibadocerinae
- Genus: Stibadocera; Enderlein, 1912

Type species
- S. bullans Enderlein, 1912

Species
- see text

Genus of flies

Stibadocera is a genus of crane fly in the family Cylindrotomidae. Stibadocera are unusual for crane flies in that the males have very long antenna, sometimes as long as the body. Most species are very small (6–10 mm).

== Biology ==
The larvae of the genus Stibadocera live on mosses. Adults are found in damp tropical habitats.

== Distribution ==
Sumatra, Papua New Guinea, Malaysia, Java, Irian Jaya, India & Philippines

== Species ==
- S. bullans Enderlein, 1912
- S. daymanensis Alexander, 1960
- S. fasciata Edwards, 1926
- S. luteipennis Alexander, 1962
- S. metallica Alexander, 1915
- S. nana Alexander, 1961
- S. nigronitida Alexander, 1972
- S. opalizans Alexander, 1931
- S. papuana Alexander, 1948
- S. perangusta Alexander, 1961
- S. pumila Alexander, 1930
- S. quadricellula (Brunetti, 1911)

== Bibliography ==
- "Catalogue of the Craneflies of the World (Diptera, Tipuloidea: Pediciidae, Limoniidae, Cylindrotomidae, Tipulidae)". Naturalis Biodiversity Center.
