= Scandiavis =

Scandiavis Temporal range: Early Eocene

Scientific classification
- Kingdom: Animalia
- Phylum: Chordata
- Class: Aves
- Clade: Neoaves
- Order: Charadriiformes
- Genus: †Scandiavis; Bertelli et al., 2013

Type species
- †Scandiavis mikkelseni (Bertelli et al., 2013)

Extinct genus of birds

Scandiavis is genus of prehistoric birds related to Charadriiformes. It is known from the Fur Formation (Early Eocene) of Denmark.
