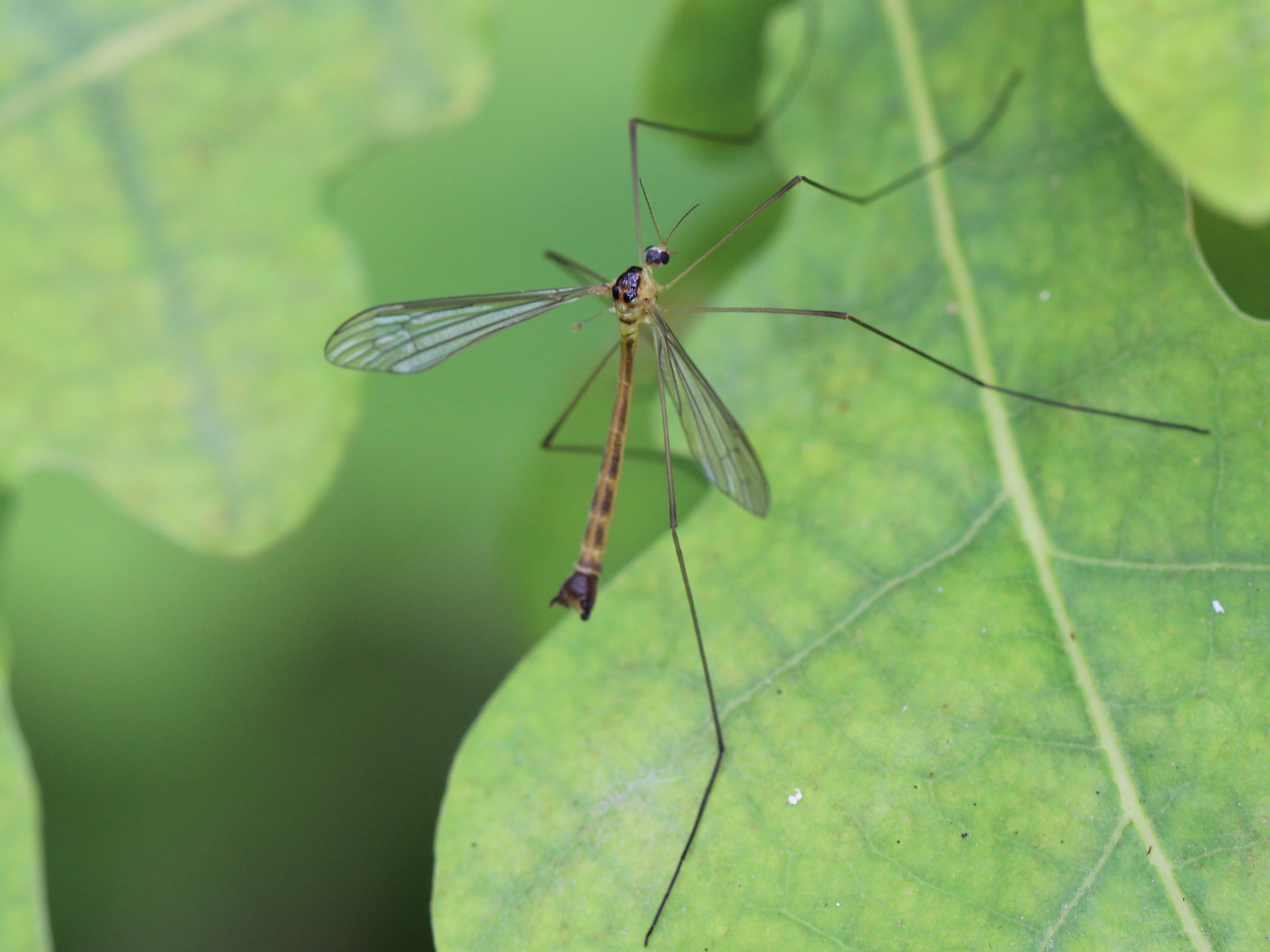
- Diogma glabrata

Scientific classification
- Kingdom: Animalia
- Phylum: Arthropoda
- Clade: Pancrustacea
- Class: Insecta
- Order: Diptera
- Suborder: Nematocera
- Infraorder: Tipulomorpha
- Superfamily: Tipuloidea
- Family: Cylindrotomidae; Schiner, 1863

Genera
- See text

= Cylindrotomidae =

Cylindrotomidae Temporal range: Paleogene–Recent

Family of flies

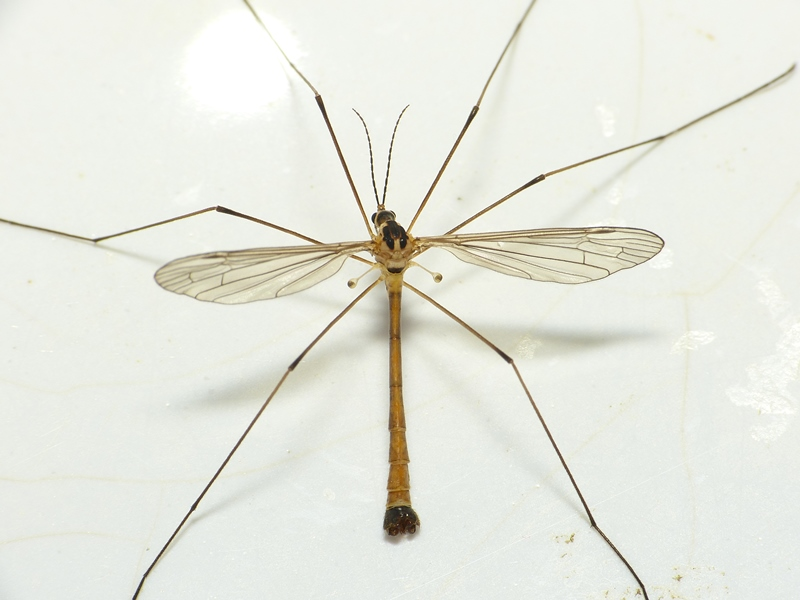
Cylindrotoma distinctissima

The Cylindrotomidae or long-bodied craneflies are a family of crane flies. More than 65 extant species in 9 genera occur worldwide. There are more than 20 extinct species.

Most recent classifications place the group to family level. This was not supported by phylogenetic analyses by Petersen et al. in 2010, but several studies and catalogs have since treated the group as a family, and they remain an established family.

== Description ==
They are mostly large flies of around 11–16 mm and yellowish to pale brownish in colour. They have long, slender antennae with 16 segments; the wings, legs and the abdomen are all very long. See for details of morphology.

== Biology ==
The larvae are all phytophagous (with the exception of the genus Cylindrotoma) and are found living on terrestrial, semiaquatic and aquatic mosses. The larvae of the genus Cylindrotoma live on various flowering plants. Adults are found in damp, wooded habitats.

== Evolutionary history ==
Although they likely split off from their closest relatives, Tipulidae, during the Jurassic, there are no fossils of the group known until the Paleogene, which belong to the living genera Cylindrotoma and Diogma and the extinct Cyttaromyia, the oldest dating to around 56 million years ago. It is likely that the family only substantially diversified during the Cenozoic, with fossil species diversity centered in Baltic Amber and western North American compression faunas such as the Green River Formation and Florissant Formation. Additional species are known from the older Fur Formation, Kishenehn Formation, and undescribed specimens are known from the Eocene Okanagan Highlands.

== Classification ==
- Subfamily Cylindrotominae

- Cylindrotoma Macquart, 1834
- Diogma Edwards, 1938
- Liogma Osten Sacken, 1869
- Phalacrocera Schiner, 1863
- Triogma Schiner, 1863
- †Cyttaromyia Scudder, 1877
- †Oryctogma Scudder, 1894

- Subfamily Stibadocerinae

- Stibadocera Enderlein, 1912
- Stibadocerella Brunetti, 1918
- Stibadocerina Alexander, 1929
- Stibadocerodes Alexander, 1928
