= Stibadocerella =

Scientific classification
- Kingdom: Animalia
- Phylum: Arthropoda
- Class: Insecta
- Order: Diptera
- Family: Cylindrotomidae
- Subfamily: Stibadocerinae
- Genus: Stibadocerella; Brunetti, 1918

Type species
- Stibadocerella pristina Brunetti, 1918

Species
- see text

Synonyms
- Agastomyia de Meijere, 1919

Genus of flies

Stibadocerella is a genus of crane fly in the family Cylindrotomidae.

== Biology ==
The larvae of the genus Stibadocerella live on mosses. Adults are to be found in damp wooded habitats.

== Distribution ==
Taiwan, China, Indonesia, Malaysia, India.

== Species ==
- S. albitarsis (de Meijere, 1919)
- S. formosensis Alexander, 1929
- S. omeiensis Alexander, 1936
- S. pristina Brunetti, 1918
