= Liogma =

- Wing veins

Scientific classification
- Kingdom: Animalia
- Phylum: Arthropoda
- Class: Insecta
- Order: Diptera
- Family: Cylindrotomidae
- Subfamily: Cylindrotominae
- Genus: Liogma; Osten Sacken, 1869

Type species
- Triogma nodicornis Osten Sacken, 1865

Species
- See text

Genus of flies

Liogma is a genus of crane fly in the family Cylindrotomidae.

== Biology ==
The larvae of the genus Liogma live on mosses. Adults are to be found in damp wooded habitats.

== Distribution ==
Canada, United States, China, Russian Far East, Japan, Taiwan.

== Species ==
- L. brevipecten Alexander, 1932
- L. brunneistigma Alexander, 1949
- L. mikado (Alexander, 1919)
- L. nodicornis (Osten Sacken, 1865)
- L. pectinicornis Alexander, 1928
- L. serraticornis Alexander, 1919
- L. simplicicornis Alexander, 1940
