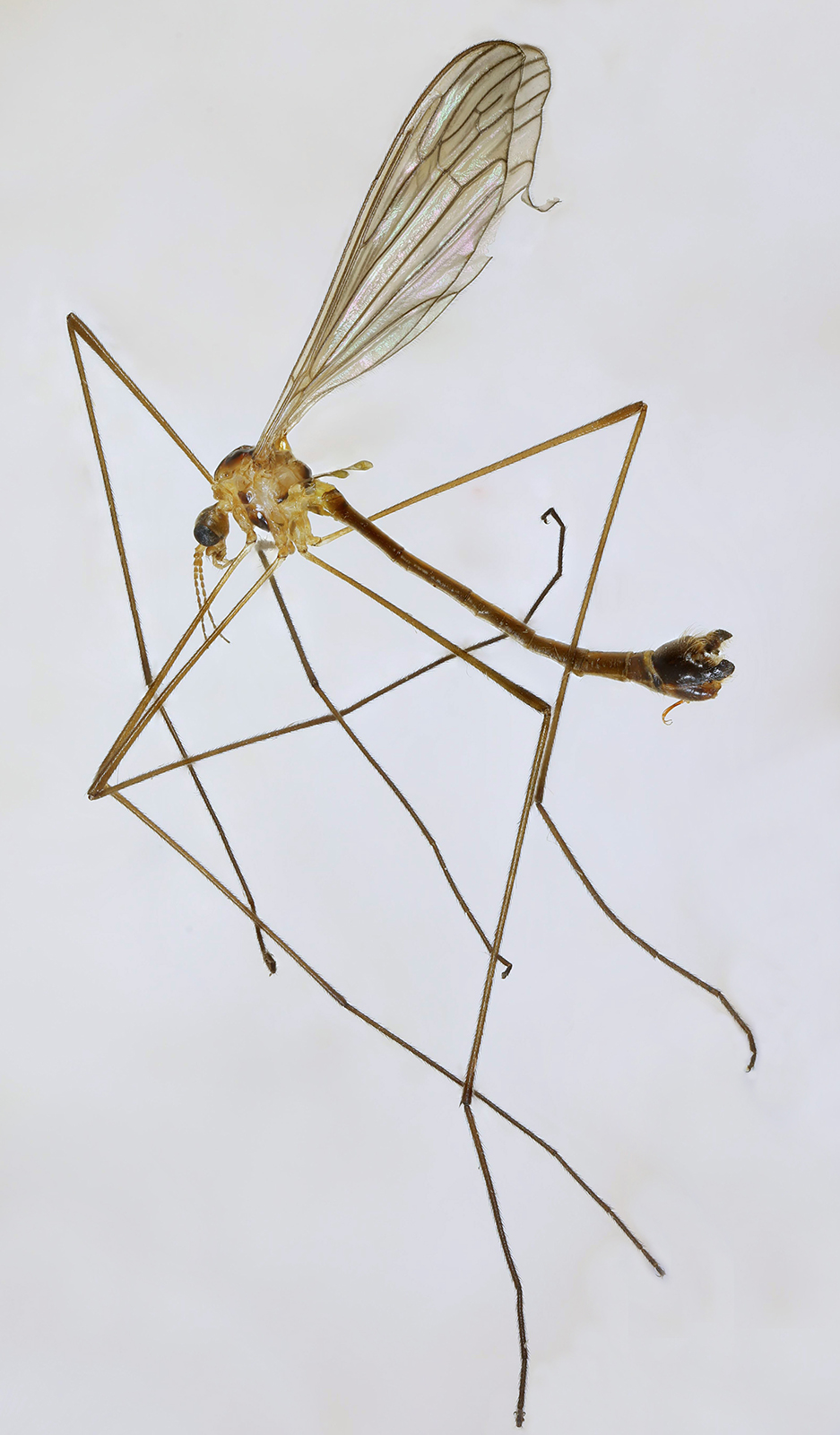
- Diogma glabrata North Wales

Scientific classification
- Kingdom: Animalia
- Phylum: Arthropoda
- Class: Insecta
- Order: Diptera
- Family: Cylindrotomidae
- Genus: Diogma
- Species: D. glabrata

Binomial name
- Diogma glabrata (Meigen, 1818)

= Diogma glabrata =

Species of fly

Diogma glabrata is a species of fly in the family Cylindrotomidae. It is found in the Palearctic.

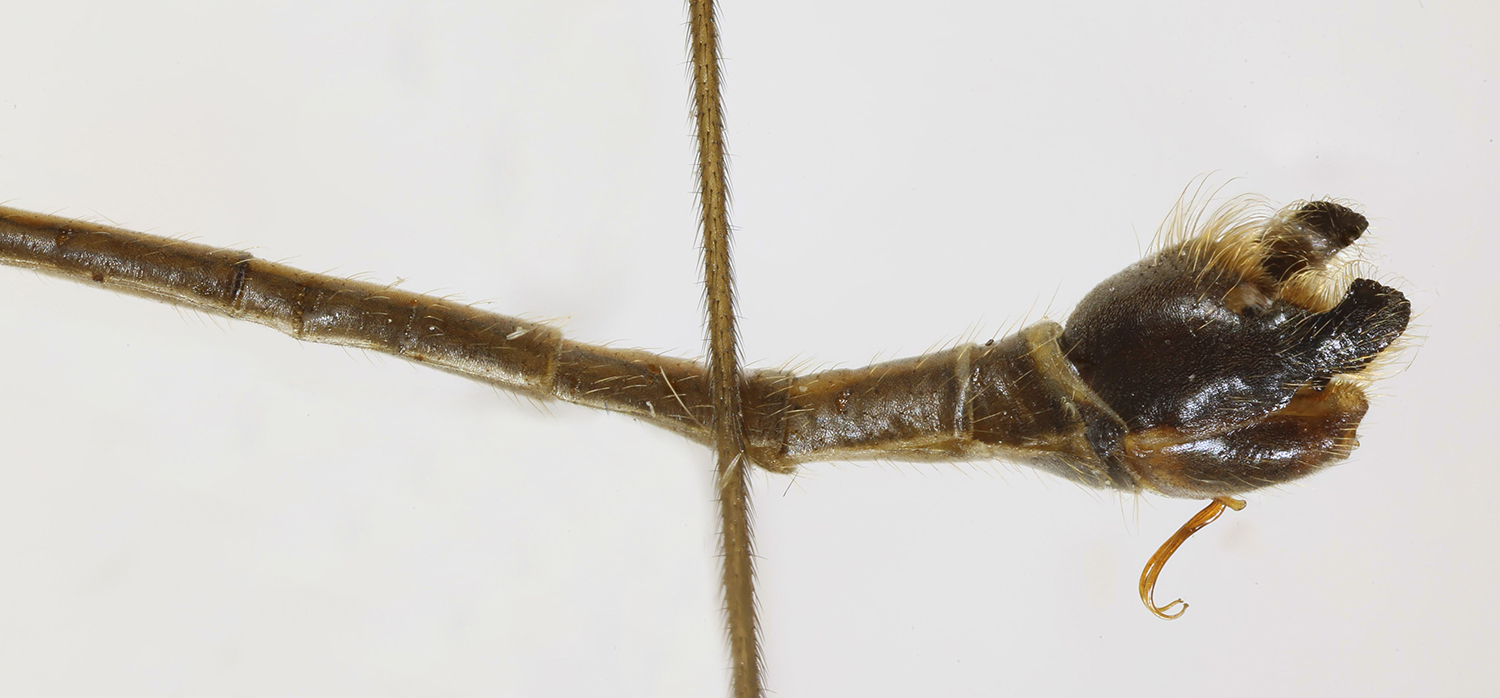
Male genitalia

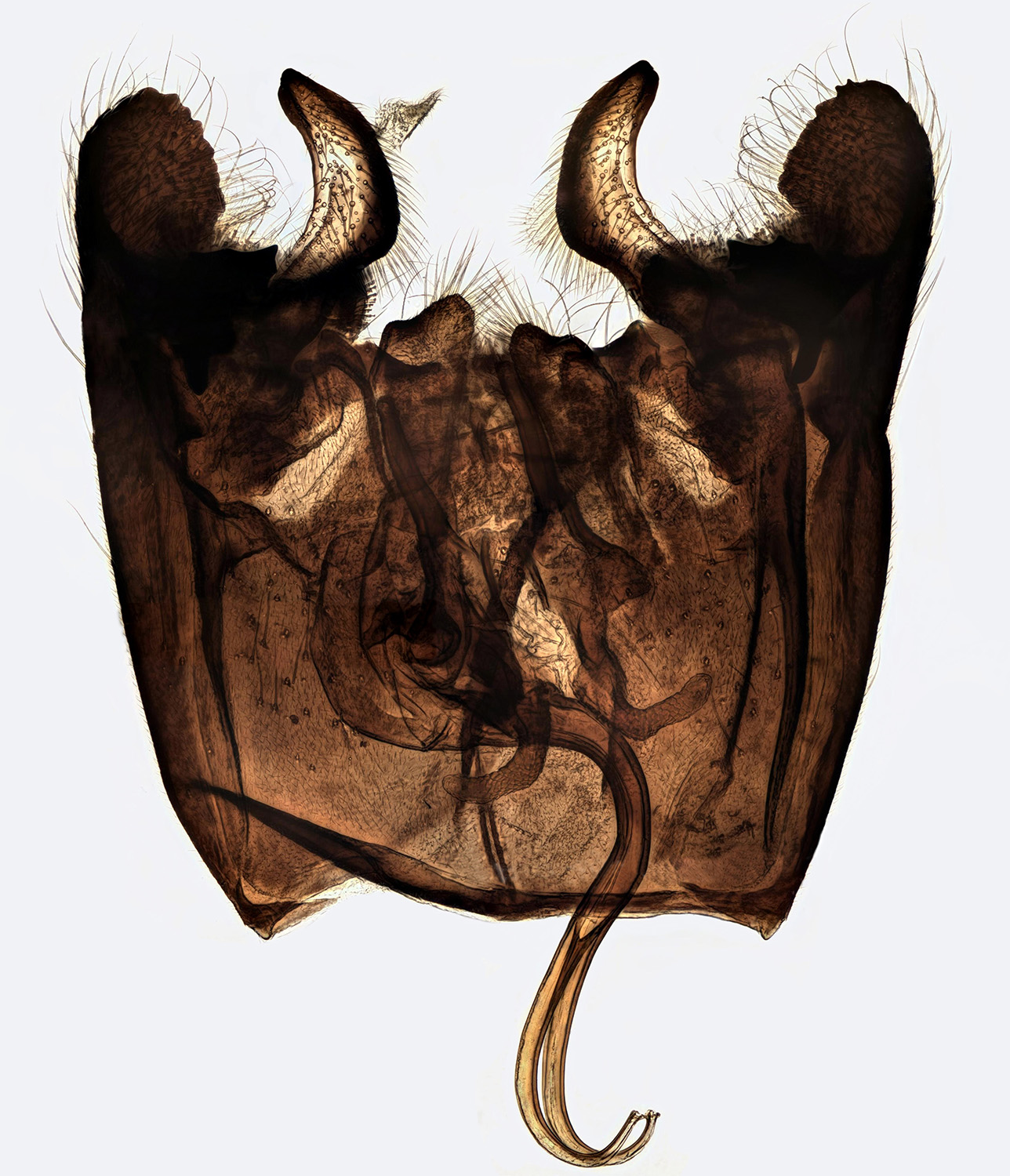
Male genitalia

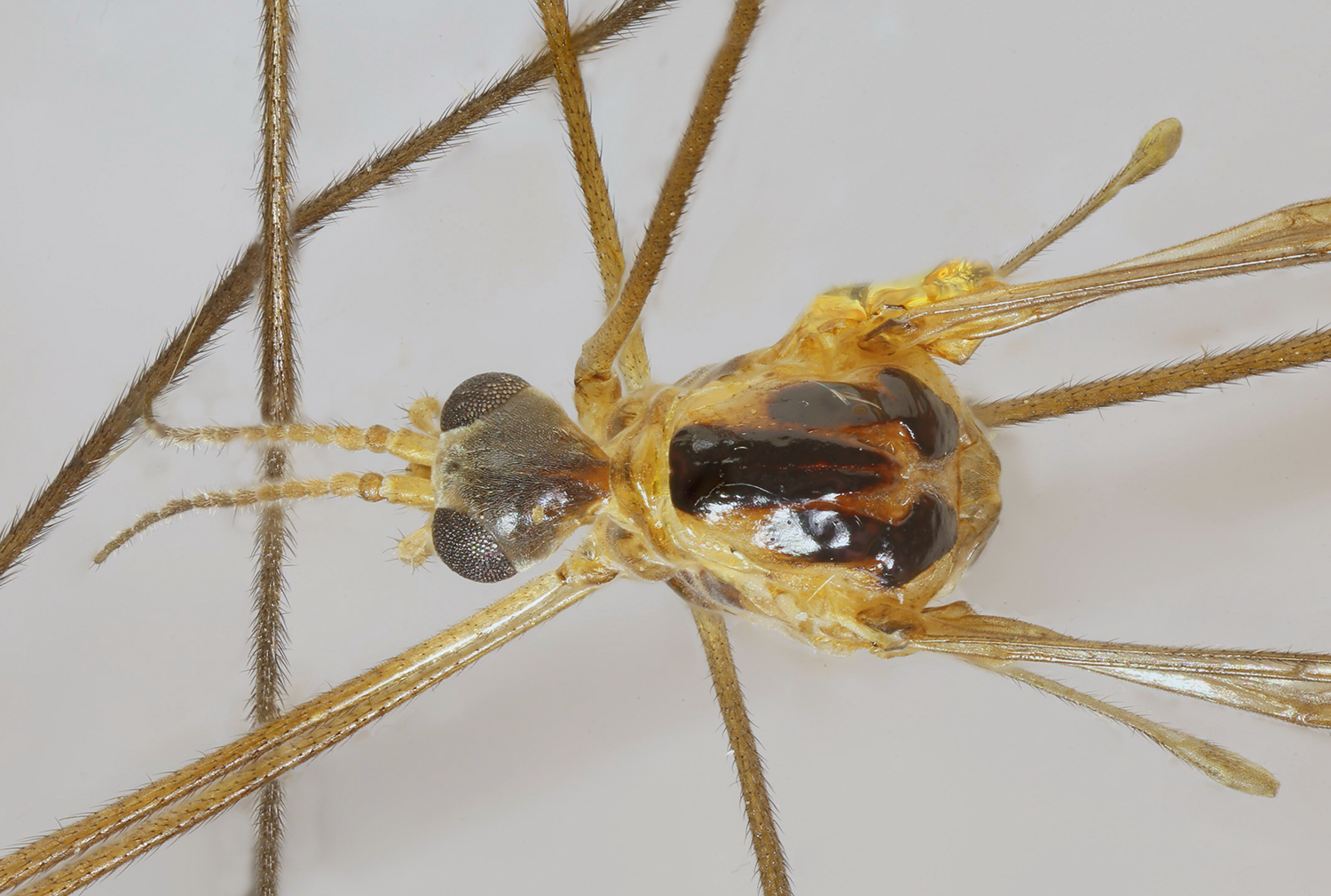
Head and dorsum
