= Stibadocerodes =

Scientific classification
- Kingdom: Animalia
- Phylum: Arthropoda
- Clade: Pancrustacea
- Class: Insecta
- Order: Diptera
- Family: Cylindrotomidae
- Subfamily: Stibadocerinae
- Genus: Stibadocerodes; Alexander, 1928

Type species
- Stibadocerella australiensis Alexander, 1922

Species
- see text

Genus of flies

Stibadocerodes is a genus of crane fly in the family Cylindrotomidae.

== Biology ==
The larvae of the genus Stibadocerodes live on mosses. Adults are to be found in damp wooded habitats.

== Distribution ==
Australia.

== Species ==
- S. australiensis (Alexander, 1922)
- S. tasmaniensis (Alexander, 1922)
- S. zherikhini Krzeminski, 2001
