= Protozeus =

Protozeus kuehnei Temporal range: Ypresian

Scientific classification
- Kingdom: Animalia
- Phylum: Chordata
- Class: Actinopterygii
- Order: Zeiformes
- Genus: †Protozeus; Bonde & Tyler in Tyler et al., 2001
- Species: †P. kuehnei

Binomial name
- †Protozeus kuehnei Bonde & Tyler in Tyler et al., 2001

Extinct genus of fishes

Protozeus kuehnei is an extinct species of fish from the Ypresian epoch Fur Formation of Denmark.

== See also ==
- Archaeozeus – a genus of extinct fish from the same formation
