= Stibadocerina =

Scientific classification
- Kingdom: Animalia
- Phylum: Arthropoda
- Class: Insecta
- Order: Diptera
- Family: Cylindrotomidae
- Subfamily: Stibadocerinae
- Genus: Stibadocerina; Alexander, 1929

Type species
- Stibadocerina chilensis Alexander, 1929

Species
- see text

Genus of flies

Stibadocerina is a genus of crane fly in the family Cylindrotomidae.

== Biology ==
The larvae of the genus Stibadocerina live on mosses. Adults are to be found in damp wooded habitats.

== Distribution ==
Chile.

== Species ==
- S. chilensis Alexander, 1929
