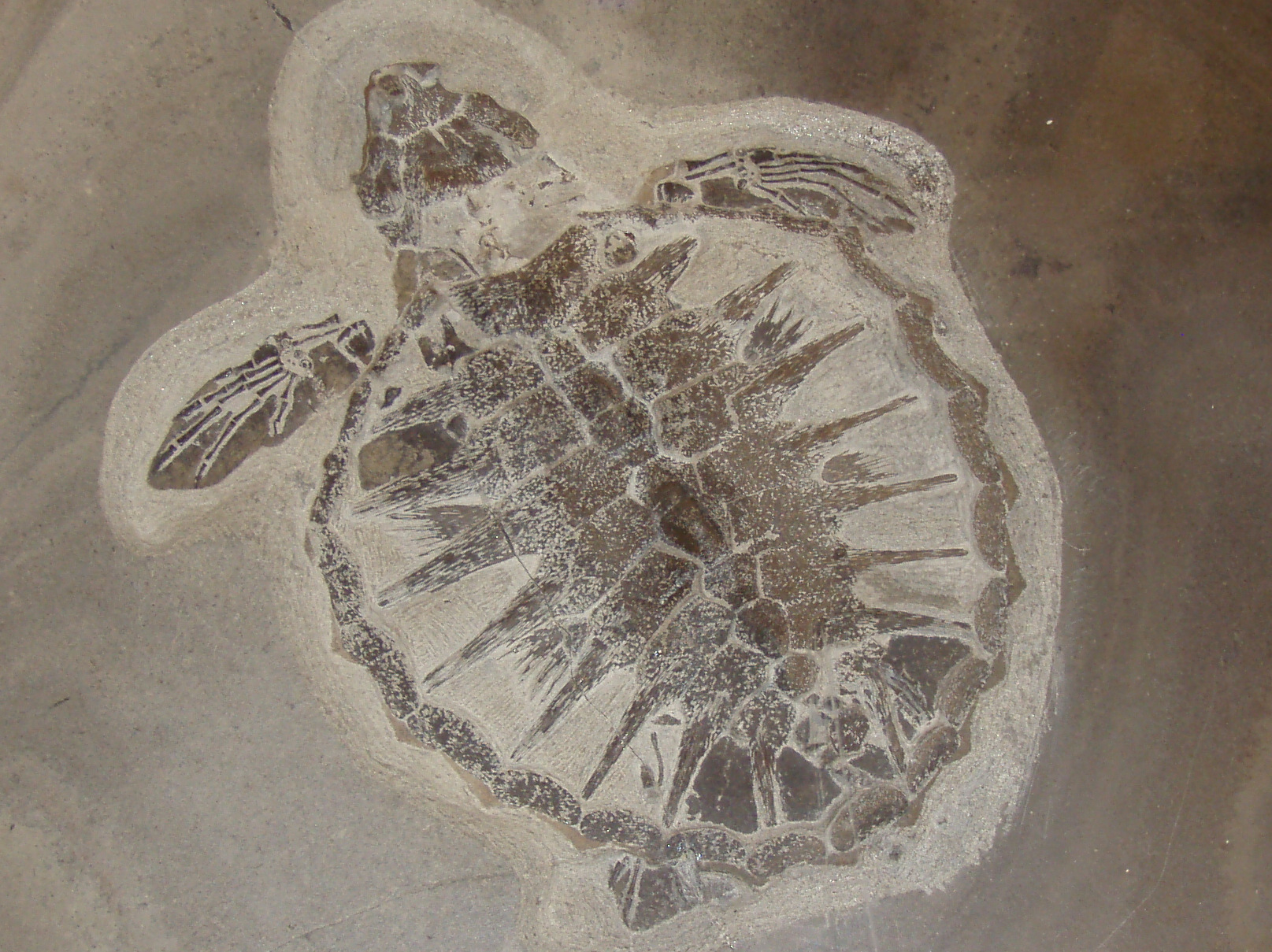
- T. danica fossil from the Fur Formation

Scientific classification
- Kingdom: Animalia
- Phylum: Chordata
- Class: Reptilia
- Order: Testudines
- Suborder: Cryptodira
- Family: Cheloniidae
- Tribe: Cheloniini
- Genus: Tasbacka; Nessov, 1987

Type species
- Tasbacka aldabergeni Nessov, 1987

Other species
- Tasbacka danica Karl & Madsen, 2012; Tasbacka germanica Karl, Gröning & Brauckmann, 2019; Tasbacka ouledabdounensis Tong & Hirayama, 2002; Tasbacka ruhoffi Weems, 1988; Tasbacka salisburgensis Karl, 1996

= Tasbacka =

Tasbacka Temporal range: Campanian-Eocene, Campanian–48.6

Extinct genus of turtles

Tasbacka is an extinct genus of sea turtle containing several species.

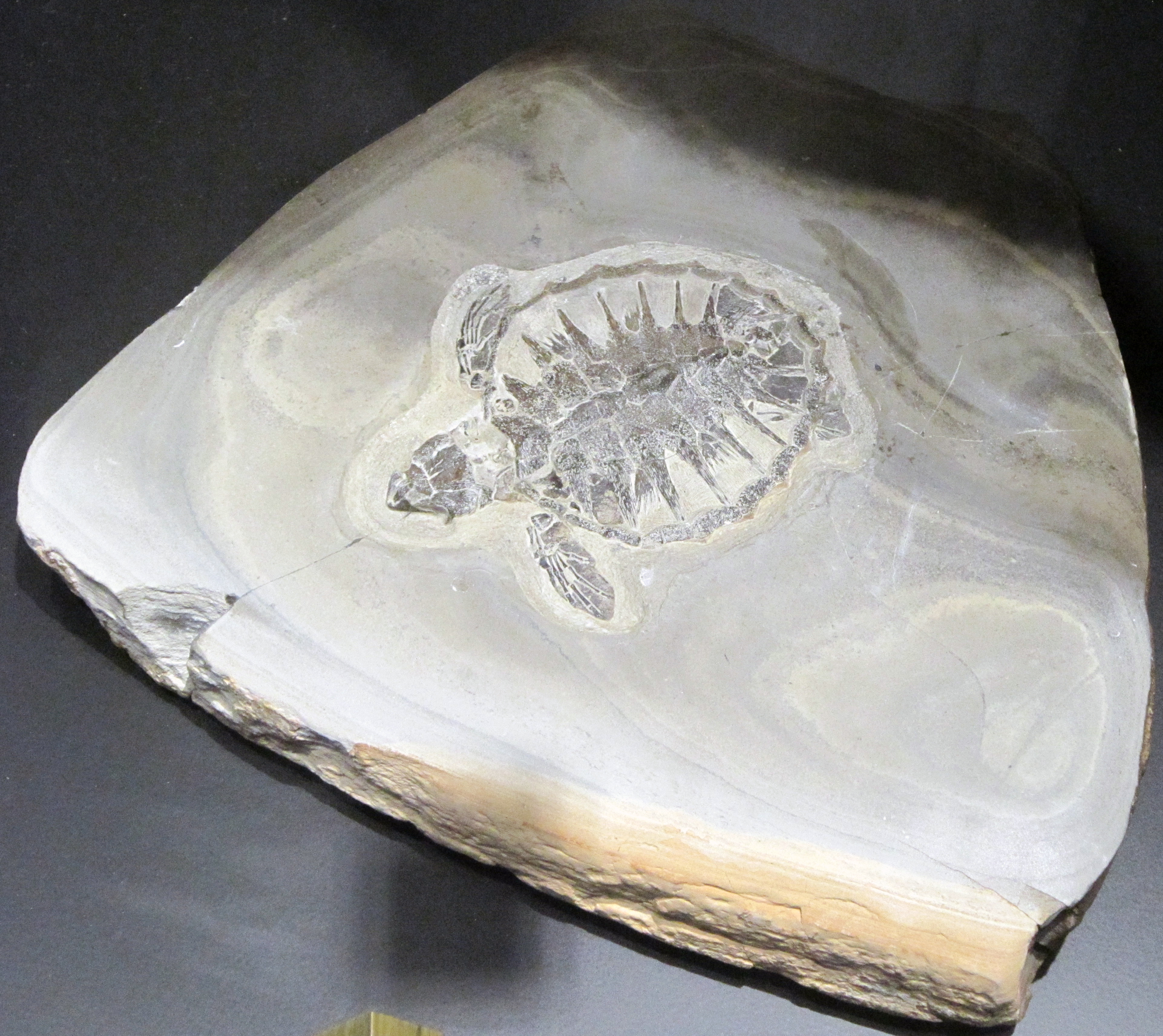
Full slab of T. danica

Though the type species, T. aldabergeni, has only been found in Kazakhstan and in Rostov Oblast, Russia, Tasbacka had a wide distribution. T. ruhoffi was found in the eastern USA, T. danica in modern Denmark, T. ouledabdounensis in modern Morocco, T. salisburgensis in modern Austria, and T. germanica in modern Germany.

In 2008, researchers found a well-preserved, juvenile specimen of T. danica in Denmark's Fur Formation. Some of the fossil's soft tissues remained. The specimen, dating back to 54 Ma, contained eumelanin. This pigment would've given the hatchling a dark shell while it was alive. Modern sea turtle hatchlings also have dark shells; while a hatchling floats on the ocean's surface, its dark coloring enables it to absorb heat from the sun and avoid predatory birds. The existence of similar pigment on an ancient specimen suggests sea turtles evolved this survival trait millions of years ago.
