= Triogma =

Scientific classification
- Kingdom: Animalia
- Phylum: Arthropoda
- Class: Insecta
- Order: Diptera
- Family: Cylindrotomidae
- Subfamily: Stibadocerinae
- Genus: Triogma; Schiner, 1863

Type species
- Limnobia nudicornis Schummel, 1829

Species
- see text

Genus of flies

Triogma is a genus of crane fly in the family Cylindrotomidae.

== Biology ==
The larvae of the genus Triogma live on mosses. Adults are to be found in damp wooded habitats.

== Distribution ==
Canada, Northern United States, Japan, China & Northern Europe

== Species ==
- T. exsculpta Osten Sacken, 1865
- T. kuwanai (Alexander, 1913)
- T. nimbipennis Alexander, 1941
- T. trisulcata (Schummel, 1829)
