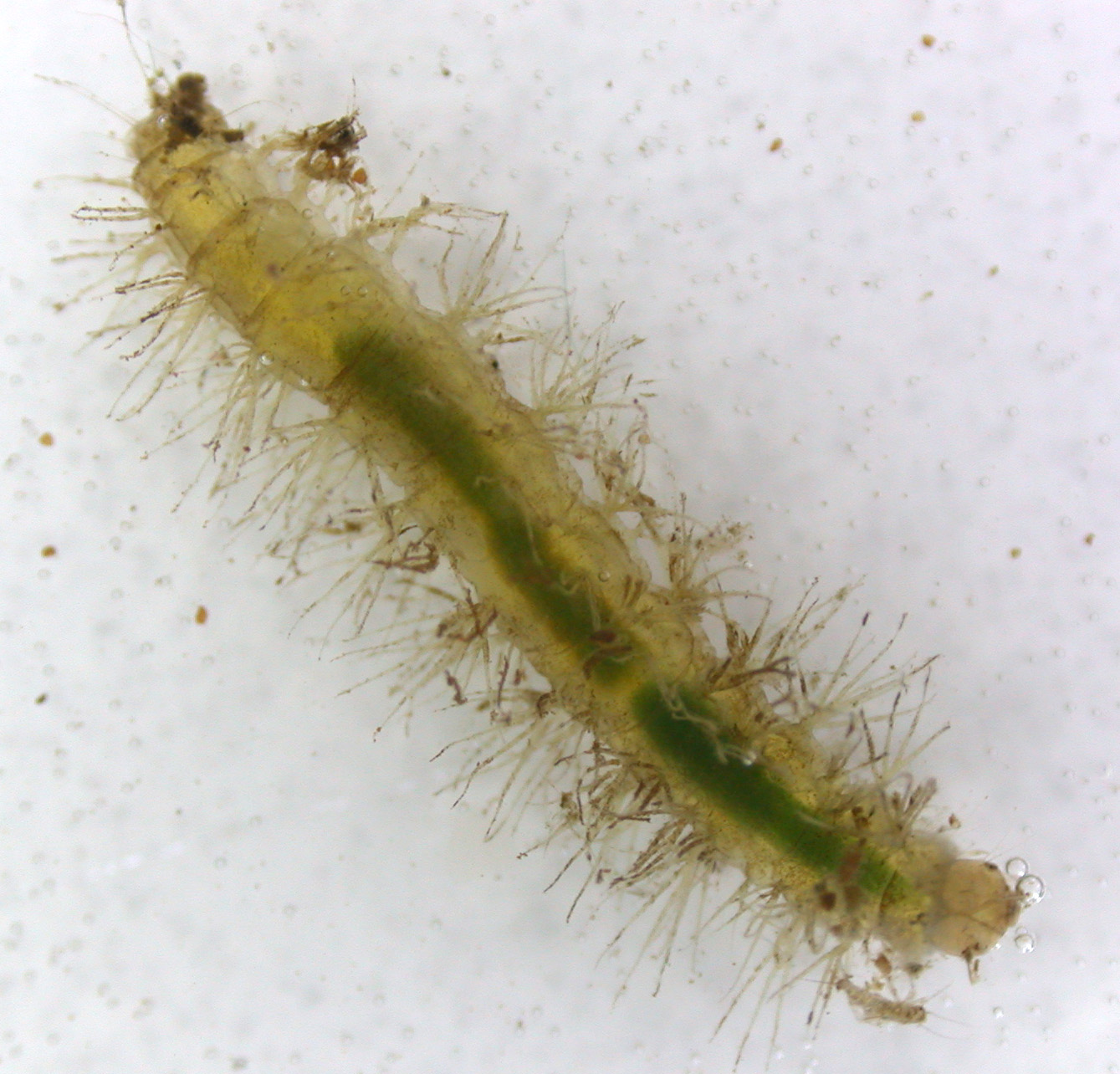
- Phalacrocera replicata

Scientific classification
- Kingdom: Animalia
- Phylum: Arthropoda
- Class: Insecta
- Order: Diptera
- Family: Cylindrotomidae
- Subfamily: Cylindrotominae
- Genus: Phalacrocera; Schiner, 1863

Type species
- Limnobia nudicornis Schiner, 1863 [= replicata (Linnaeus, 1758)]

Species
- See text

= Phalacrocera =

Genus of flies

Phalacrocera is a genus of crane fly in the family Cylindrotominae.

== Biology ==
The larvae of the genus Phalacrocera live on mosses. Adults are to be found in damp wooded habitats.

== Distribution ==
Canada, United States, Myanmar, Taiwan, India, China, Japan, Europe, Most species have a fairly limited known ranges, with the exception of P. replicata which is fairly cosmopolitan in North America, Northern Europe and Northern Asia.

== Species ==
- P. angustaxillaris Alexander, 1972
- P. formosae Alexander, 1923
- P. manipurensis Alexander, 1964
- P. messura Alexander, 1972
- P. nigrolutea Alexander, 1972
- P. occidentalis Alexander, 1928
- P. replicata (Linnaeus, 1758)
- P. sikkimensis Alexander, 1972
- P. tarsalba Alexander, 1936
- P. tipulina Osten Sacken, 1865
- P. vancouverensis Alexander, 1927
