= Archaeozeus =

Archaeozeus Temporal range: Ypresian, 55.8–53.5 Ma

Scientific classification
- Kingdom: Animalia
- Phylum: Chordata
- Class: Actinopterygii
- Order: Zeiformes
- Family: †Archaeozeidae; Tyler & Santini, 2005
- Genus: †Archaeozeus; Bonde & Tyler in Tyler et al., 2001
- Species: †A. skamolensis

Binomial name
- †Archaeozeus skamolensis Bonde & Tyler in Tyler et al., 2001

Extinct genus of fishes

Archaeozeus is an extinct genus of marine ray-finned fish from the Ypresian epoch Fur Formation of Denmark. It contains a single species, A. skamolensis, and is the only member of the family Archaeozeidae. It is considered the most basal member of the order Zeiformes.

== See also ==
- Protozeus – a genus of extinct fish from the same formation
