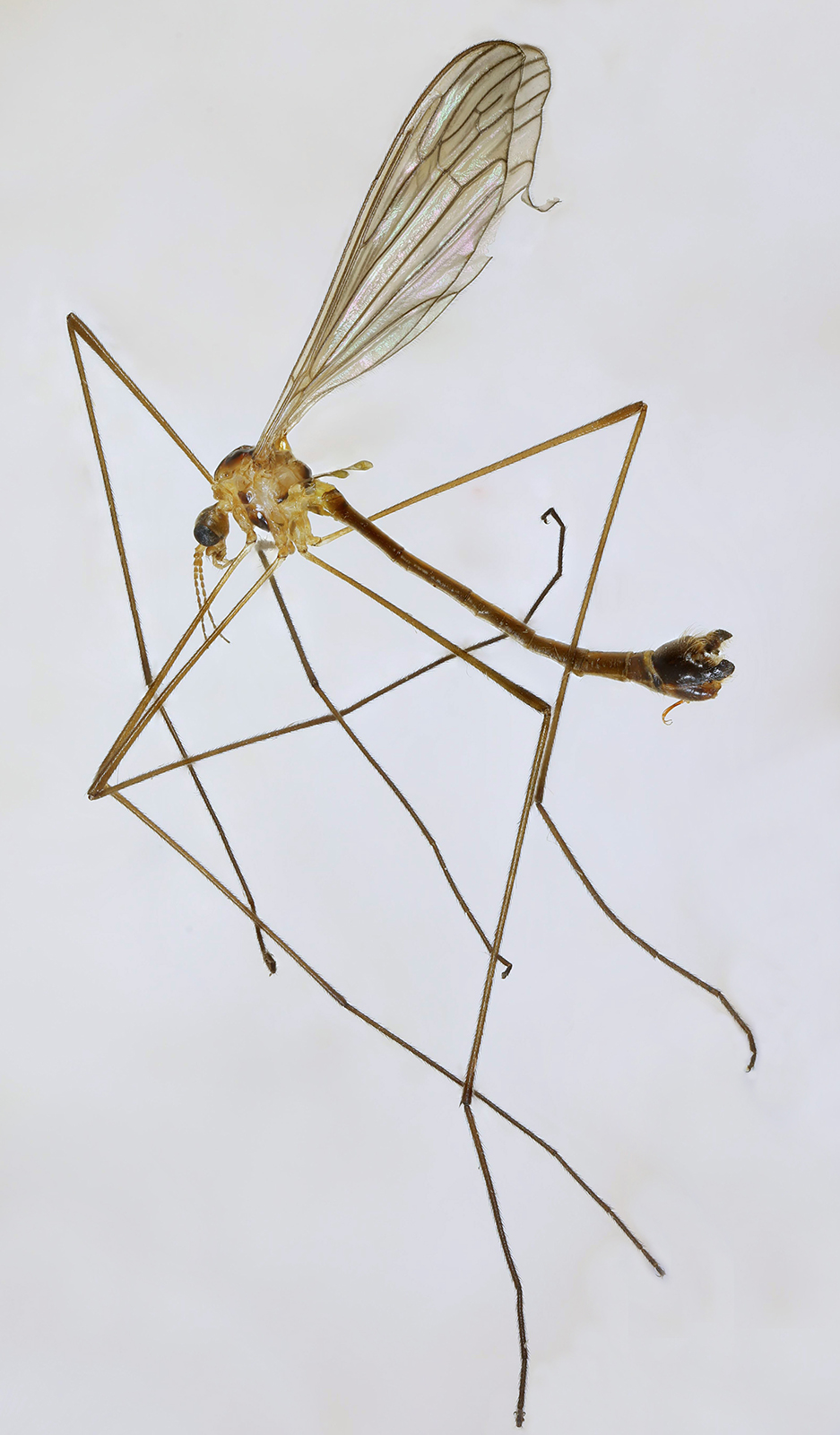
- Diogma glabrata

Scientific classification
- Domain: Eukaryota
- Kingdom: Animalia
- Phylum: Arthropoda
- Class: Insecta
- Order: Diptera
- Family: Cylindrotomidae
- Subfamily: Cylindrotominae
- Genus: Diogma; Edwards, 1938

Type species
- Limnobia glabrata Meigen, 1818

Species
- See text

= Diogma =

Genus of flies

Diogma is a genus of crane flies in the family Cylindrotomidae.

== Biology ==
The larvae of the genus Diogma live on mosses. Adults are to be found in damp wooded habitats.

== Distribution ==
Palaearctic.

== Species ==
- Diogma brevifurca Alexander, 1949
- Diogma caudata Takahashi, 1960
- Diogma dmitrii Paramonov, 2005
- Diogma glabrata (Meigen, 1818)
- Diogma minuticornis (Alexander, 1935)
- Diogma sinensis Yang & Yang, 1995
