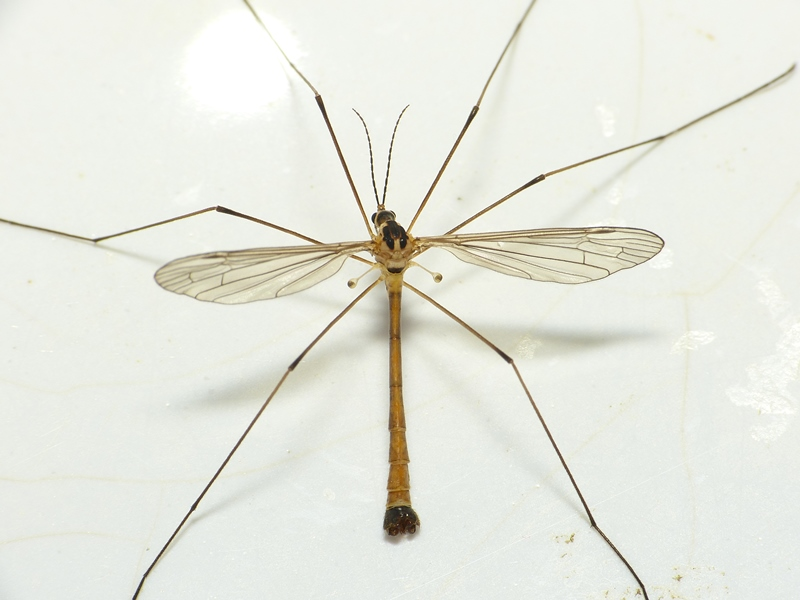
- Cylindrotoma distinctissima

Scientific classification
- Kingdom: Animalia
- Phylum: Arthropoda
- Class: Insecta
- Order: Diptera
- Family: Cylindrotomidae
- Subfamily: Cylindrotominae
- Genus: Cylindrotoma; Macquart, 1834

Type species
- Limnobia distinctissima Meigen, 1818

Species
- see text

= Cylindrotoma =

Genus of flies

Cylindrotoma distinctissima in copula

Cylindrotoma is a genus of crane fly in the family Cylindrotomidae.

== Biology ==
The larvae of the genus Cylindrotoma live on various flowering plants. Adults are to be found in damp wooded habitats.

== Distribution ==
Species can be found throughout Asia, North America, and Europe. China in the most species-rich country.

== Species ==
- C. angustipennis Alexander, 1941
- C. aurantia Alexander, 1935
- C. borealis Peus, 1952
- C. deserrata Alexander, 1972
- C. distinctissima (Meigen, 1818)
- C. fokiensis Alexander, 1949
- C. hypopygialis Alexander, 1938
- C. japonica Alexander, 1919
- C. megacera Alexander, 1938
- C. nigripes Alexander, 1931
- C. nigritarsis Alexander, 1957
- C. nigriventris Loew, 1849
- C. pallidipes Alexander, 1954
- C. rufescens Edwards, 1928
- C. seticornis Alexander, 1964
- C. simplex Alexander, 1972
- C. subapterogyne Alexander, 1964
- C. taiwania (Alexander, 1929)
- C. tarsalis Johnson, 1912
- C. trichophora Alexander, 1972
