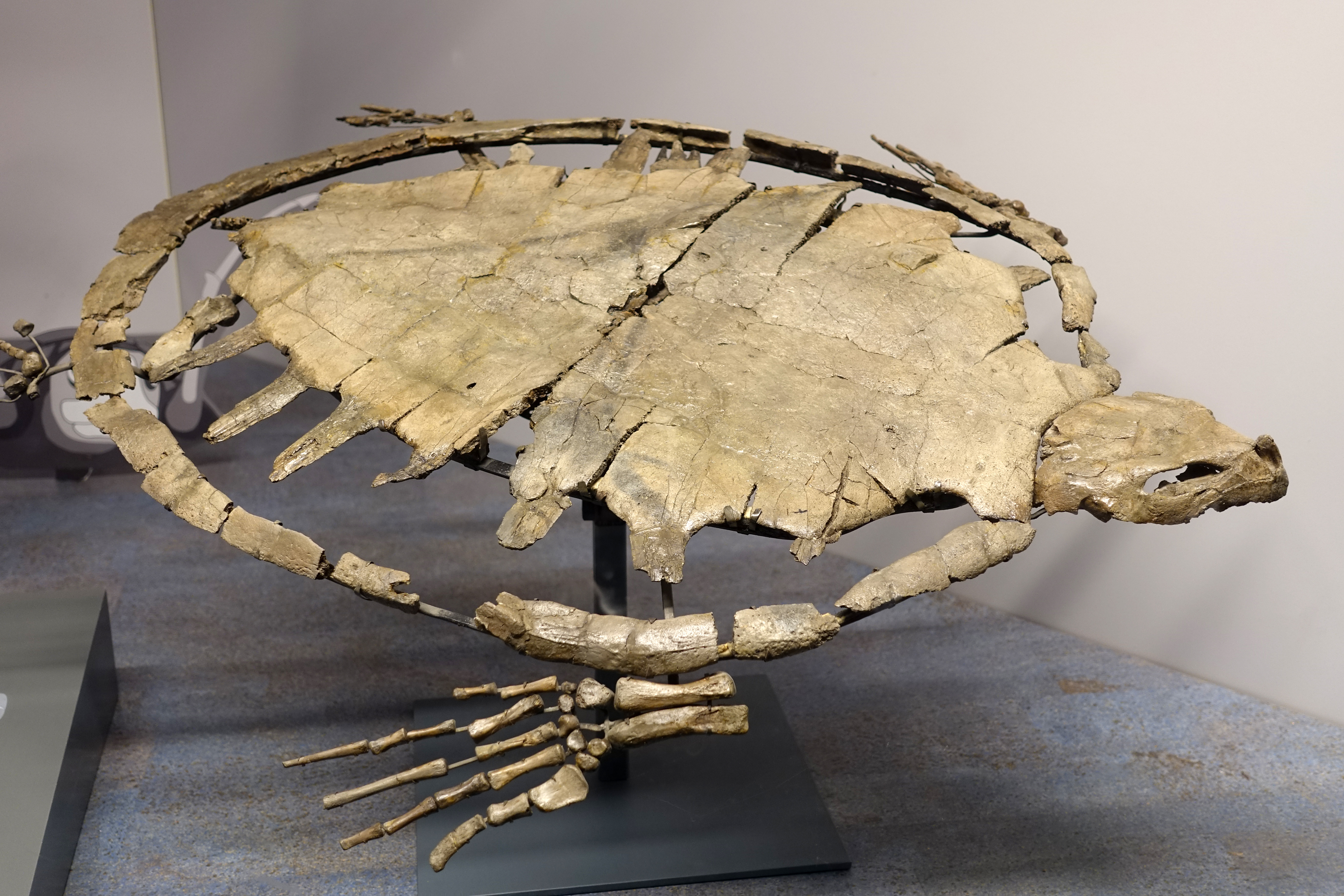
- G. gwinneri skeleton in Senckenberg Museum

Scientific classification
- Domain: Eukaryota
- Kingdom: Animalia
- Phylum: Chordata
- Class: Reptilia
- Order: Testudines
- Suborder: Cryptodira
- Clade: Pancheloniidae
- Genus: †Glarichelys; Zangerl, 1958

= Glarichelys =

Extinct genus of turtles

Glarichelys is an extinct genus of sea turtle which was originally considered to be from the middle Oligocene epoch but has more recently come to be considered from the Eocene epoch. It was first named by Zangerl in 1958.

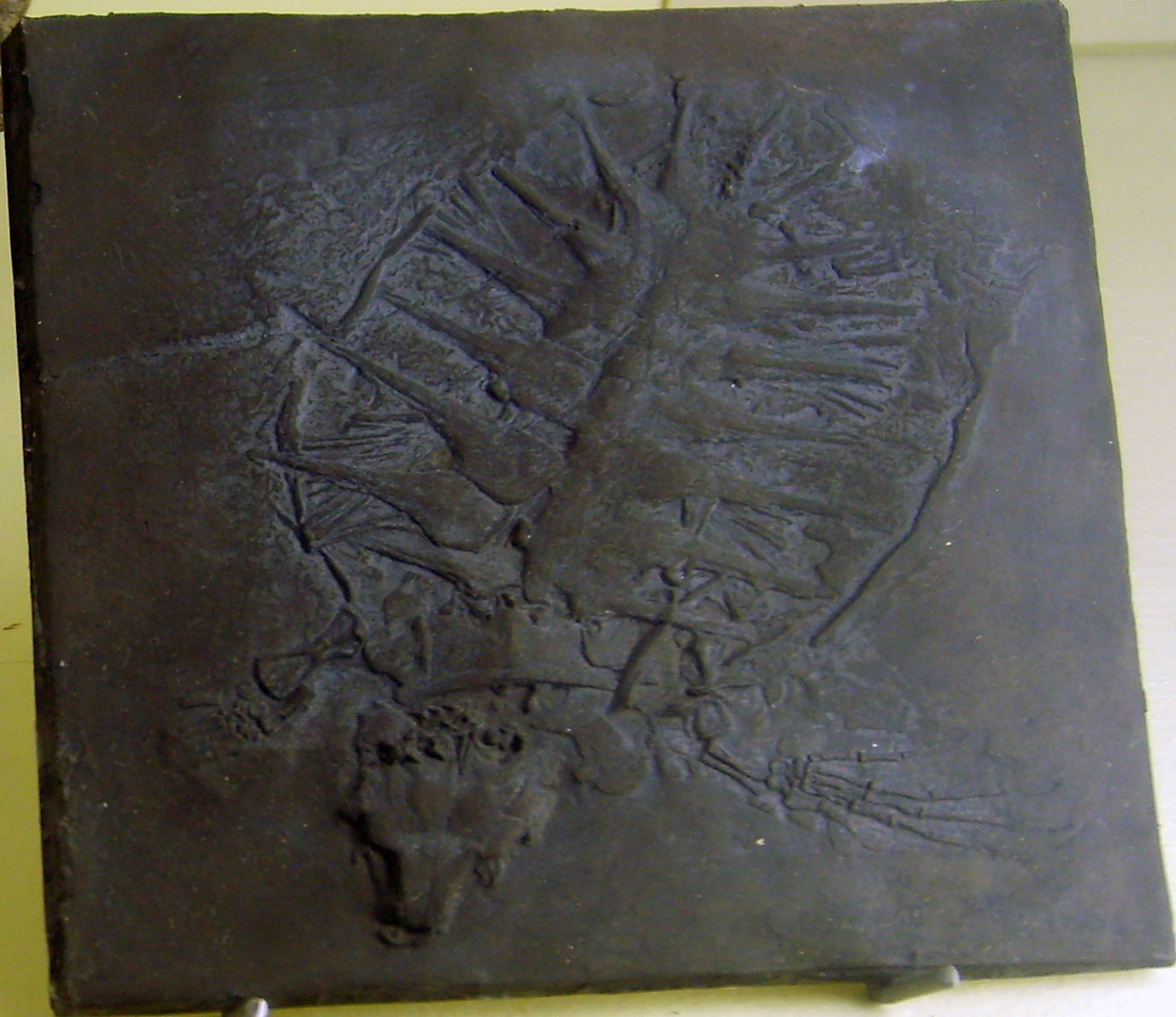
G. knorri fossil cast at the Museum für Naturkunde, Berlin
