= Stibadocerinae =

Scientific classification
- Domain: Eukaryota
- Kingdom: Animalia
- Phylum: Arthropoda
- Class: Insecta
- Order: Diptera
- Infraorder: Tipulomorpha
- Superfamily: Tipuloidea
- Family: Cylindrotomidae
- Subfamily: Stibadocerinae

Genera
- See text

Subfamily of flies

The Stibadocerinae are one of two subfamilies in the crane fly family Cylindrotomidae. Stibadocerinae has a total of 20 recorded species, found only in the southern hemisphere.

== Genera ==
- Stibadocera Enderlein, 1912
- Stibadocerella Brunetti, 1918
- Stibadocerina Alexander, 1929
- Stibadocerodes Alexander, 1928
