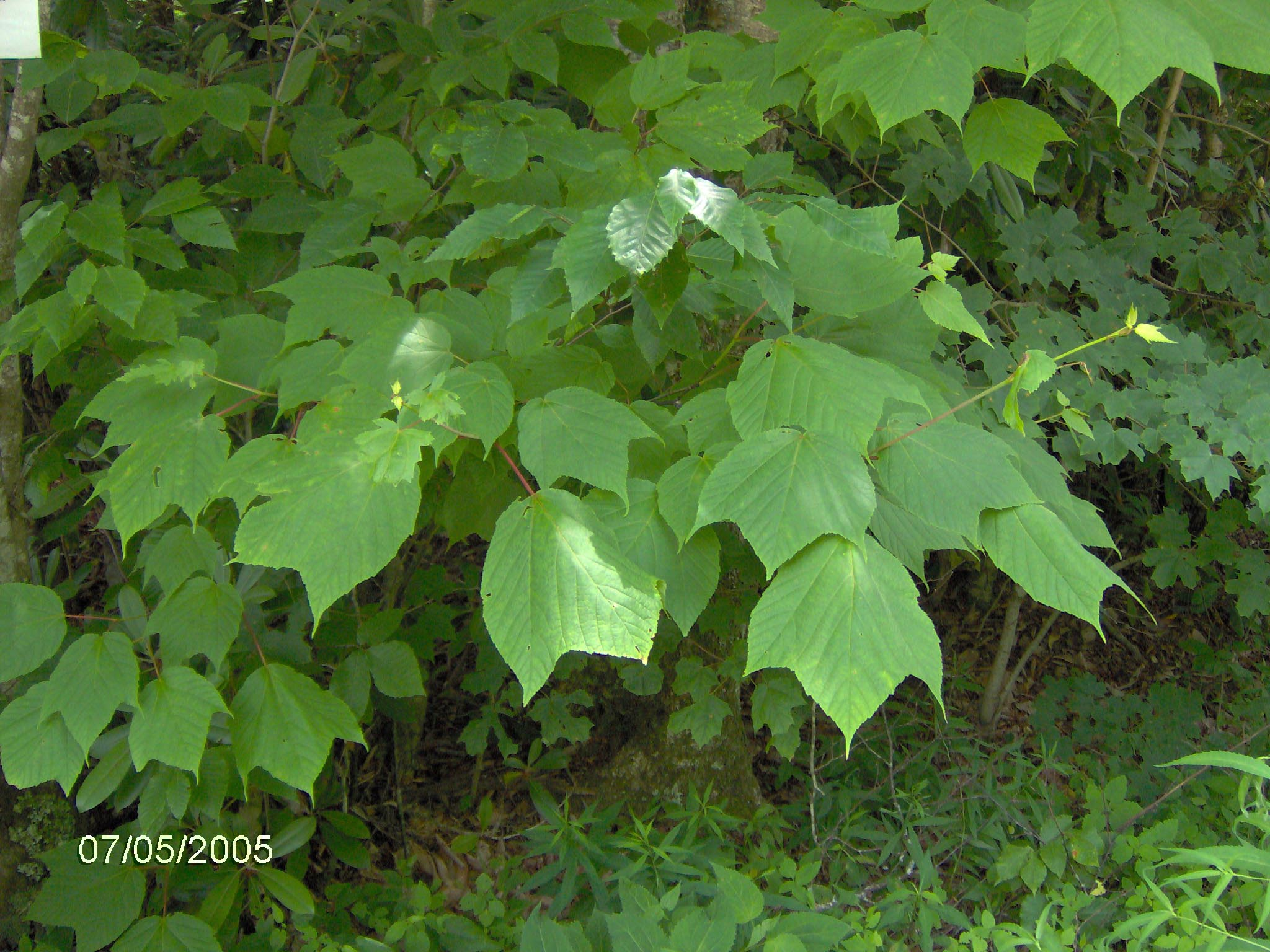
- Striped maple leaves, Cranberry Wilderness, West Virginia

Conservation status
- Least Concern (IUCN 3.1)

- Secure (NatureServe)

Scientific classification
- Kingdom: Plantae
- Clade: Tracheophytes
- Clade: Angiosperms
- Clade: Eudicots
- Clade: Rosids
- Order: Sapindales
- Family: Sapindaceae
- Genus: Acer
- Section: Acer sect. Macrantha
- Species: A. pensylvanicum

Binomial name
- Acer pensylvanicum L.
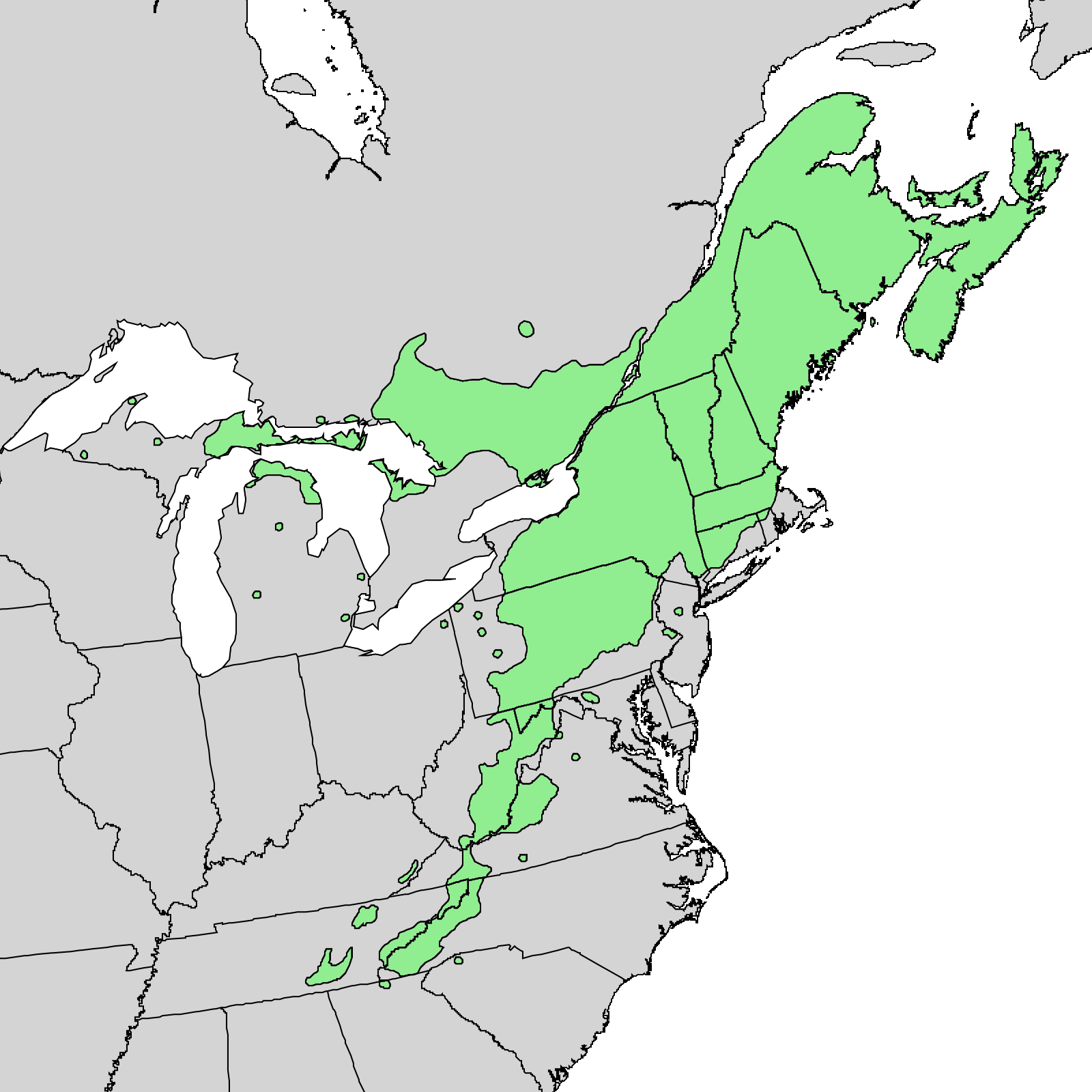
- Natural range

Synonyms
- Acer canadense Duhamel; Acer tricuspifolium Stokes

= Acer pensylvanicum =

Species of maple

Acer pensylvanicum, known as the striped maple, moosewood, whistlewood, moose maple or goosefoot maple, is a North American species of maple. It is a small, slow-growing understory tree that can change its sex throughout its lifetime.

== Description ==
Striped maple is a large shrub or small deciduous tree growing to 5–10 meters (16–33 ft) tall, with a trunk up to 20 centimeters (8 in) in diameter. The shape of the perennial tree is broadly columnar, with a short, forked trunk that divides into arching branches which create an uneven, flat-topped crown.

The young bark is a smooth gray-green with prominent white vertical striping. With age, it becomes a brownish or grayish green and the stripes darken and fade into a reddish-brown color. Striping may disappear entirely with age.

The leaves are broad and soft, 8–15 cm (3–6 in) long and 6–12 cm (2 1/2–4 1/2 in) broad, with finely serrated edges and three shallow forward-pointing lobes. The leaves emerge in spring with pink tinges, mature into dark green in the summer, and then turn bright yellow in the fall.

In May and June, yellow bell-shaped flowers, individually about 6 millimeters (1/4 in) across, bloom in racemes of 10–15 cm (4–6 in) in length. The flowers are typically pseudohermaphroditic, appearing the opposite of their true sex. The species is most often dioecious, but monoecy occurs, and both sexes may appear on the same raceme. Striped maple trees are able to change sex, and appear to do so in response to environmental conditions. One study found that most changes were from male to female, with female trees being overall less vigorous and a significant proportion of female trees dying at the end of the growing season.

The fruit is a samara. The seeds are about 27 mm (1 in) long and 11 mm (3/8 in) broad, with a wing angle of 145° and a conspicuously veined pedicel. Samaras ripen and disperse in late summer or early fall, changing in color from a faint red to tan or light brown.

Immature bark

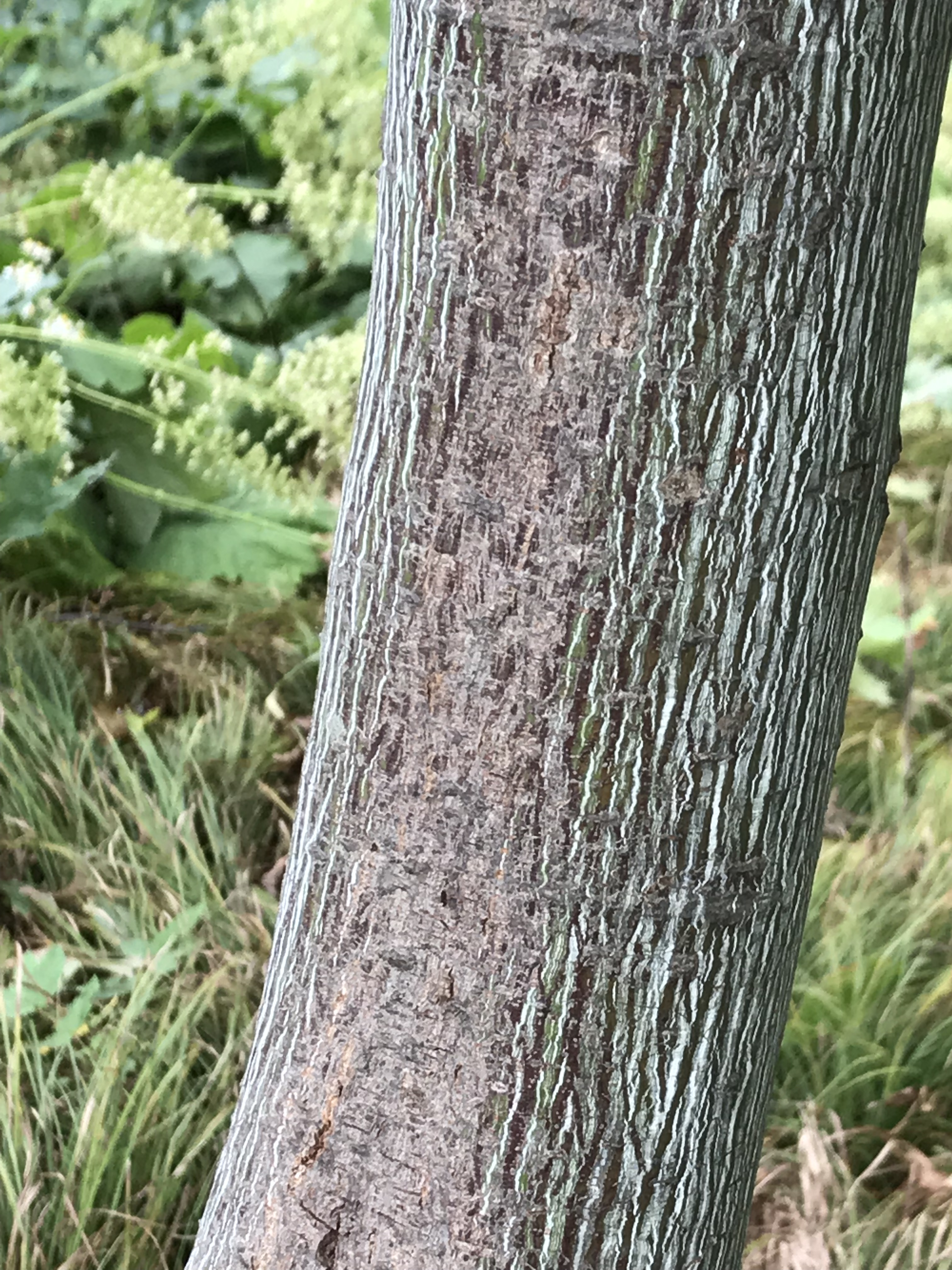
Mature bark

Leaves and flowers

Flower close-up

== Taxonomy ==
Striped maple was first described in 1753 by Swedish biologist Carl Linnaeus, based on a specimen collected in Pennsylvania. The scientific name, pensylvanicum, means "of Pennsylvania". Although pensylvanicum is a misspelling, it is accepted as it was the originally used name when the plant was first described.

== Distribution and habitat ==
The natural range of the striped maple extends from Nova Scotia and the Gaspé Peninsula of Quebec, west to southern Ontario, Michigan, and Saskatchewan; south to northeastern Ohio, Pennsylvania, and New Jersey, and along the Appalachian Mountains as far south as northern Georgia. It is the only species of snakebark maple native to North America. It was introduced to England in 1760 as an ornamental plant, and into continental Europe shortly afterwards.

Striped maple can grow well in a variety of soils and will tolerate nutrient-poor, leached soils, but it is most commonly found on well-drained, moist, sandy loams and grows best as an understory tree on the shaded, cool northerly slopes of deep valleys.

== Ecology ==
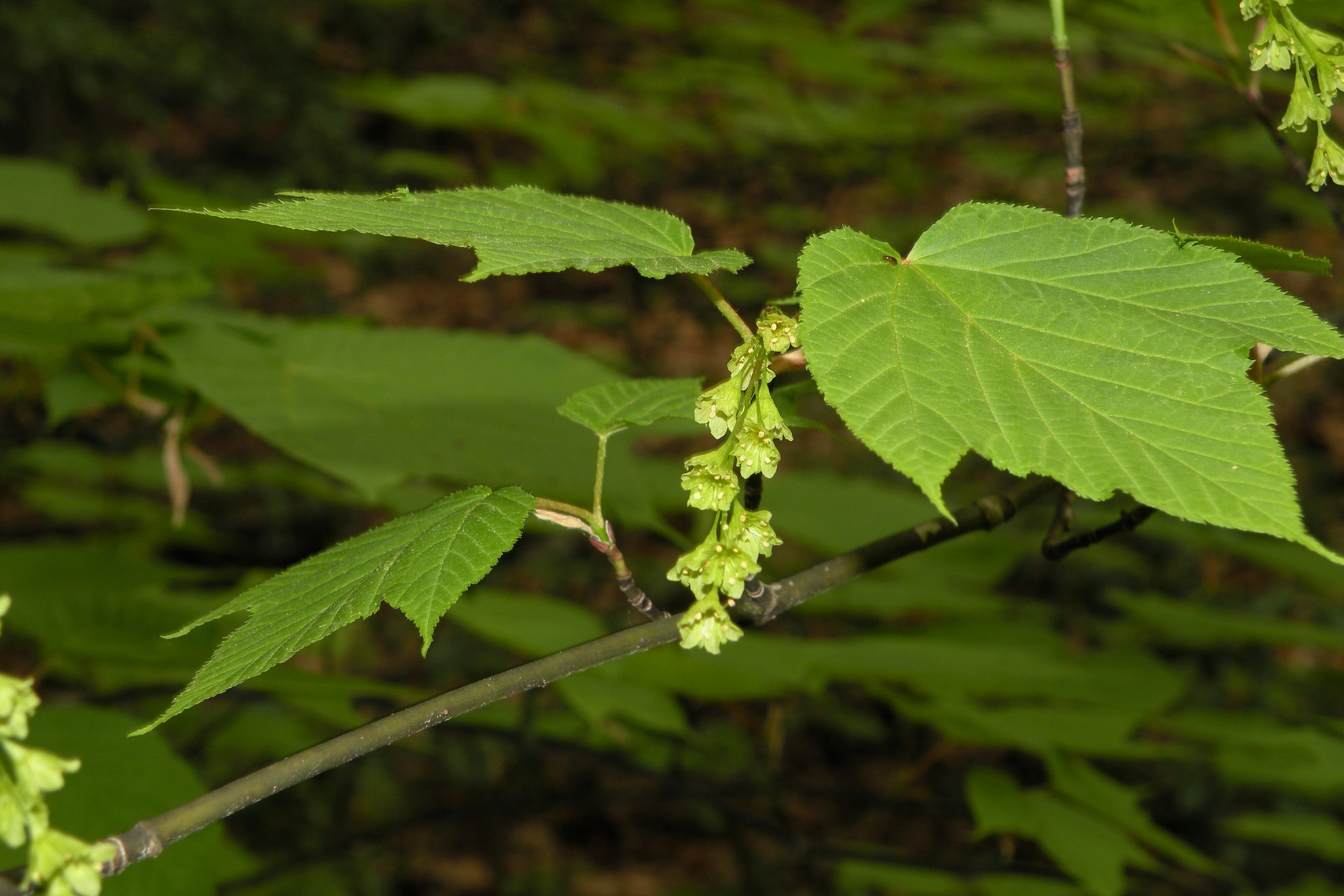
Inflorescence in Ashford, Connecticut

Striped maple is well-adapted to heavy shade and among the most shade-tolerant of deciduous trees. It is capable of germinating and persisting for years as a small understory shrub, then growing rapidly to its full height when a gap opens up. However, it does not grow tall enough to become a canopy tree, and once the gap above it closes through succession, it responds by flowering and fruiting profusely, and to some degree spreading by vegetative reproduction.

Mammals such as moose, deer, beavers, porcupines, and rabbits eat the twigs, buds, seeds, and bark, particularly during the winter. Ruffed grouse eat the samaras and buds. Woodland caribou browse it during summer months, and beavers will feed on striped maple when preferred species are not abundant. As an understory shrub or tree, striped maple provides habitat by creating vertical diversity in the forest canopy.

It is susceptible to Verticillium wilt, caused by Verticillium albo-atrum, and gray mold spot, caused by Cristulariella depraedens. A type of Pezicula trunk and branch canker, Pezicula subcarnea, appears to only attack striped maple. It can be subject to infestation by Agrilus politus, a flatheaded borer beetle which forms stem galls.

Unique among trees and according to the United States Department of Agriculture, the striped maple is the only tree that is both fire resistant and also possesses a medium tolerance to fire

== Conservation ==
Striped maple is classified by the International Union for Conservation of Nature as Least Concern, and by NatureServe as Globally Secure. It is classified in Wisconsin, which is on the extreme western edges of its range, as being Critically Imperiled, being known from only a single location in Door County. Overall, the population is believed to be large and well-distributed across its range. It may be threatened by the Asian long-horned beetle (Anoplophora glabripennis), as their preferred hosts are maples, and infestation of striped maples by Asian longhorned beetle has been shown to cause increased mortality. Climate change may also pose a threat by reducing or otherwise altering the range and availability of suitable habitat; the species prefers cool summers, and does not tolerate heat or drought well. In the southernmost portions of its range, habitat fragmentation, forest management practices, and land-use conversion pose low-level threats to the species.

== Cultivation ==
Striped maple is cultivated uncommonly as an ornamental plant for its unique striped bark and fall color. The most notable cultivar is 'Erythrocladium', which has bright coral or salmon-red colored twigs and a bright pink or reddish coloration to the bark in the wintertime. This cultivar was discovered in Germany around 1904, but is uncommon commercially due to difficulty propagating it.

== Uses ==
Striped maple has been used for medicinal and material purposes by several Northeastern Woodlands tribes. The Penobscot of Maine call it atohkímosi, and use a poultice made from the steeped bark to relieve swelling of the limbs, as well as in compound infusions to treat coughing up of blood, kidney troubles, and venereal disease. The Haudenosaunee use decoctions including striped maple bark as an emetic and laxative. The Mi'kmaq call it wapoq and use decoctions of the bark for various respiratory issues and as a beverage. The Ojibwe use the bark as an emetic, and a northern Minnesota band of Ojibwe, the Bois Forte Band of Chippewa, have also been recorded as using striped maple wood to make arrows and dice bowls.

One of the common names, whistlewood, reflects the usage of bark and branches to carve whistles. Colonial-era Canadian & American farmers reportedly fed cattle dried leaves in the winter and turned horses and cows into woodlands to browse on shoots and buds in the spring.
