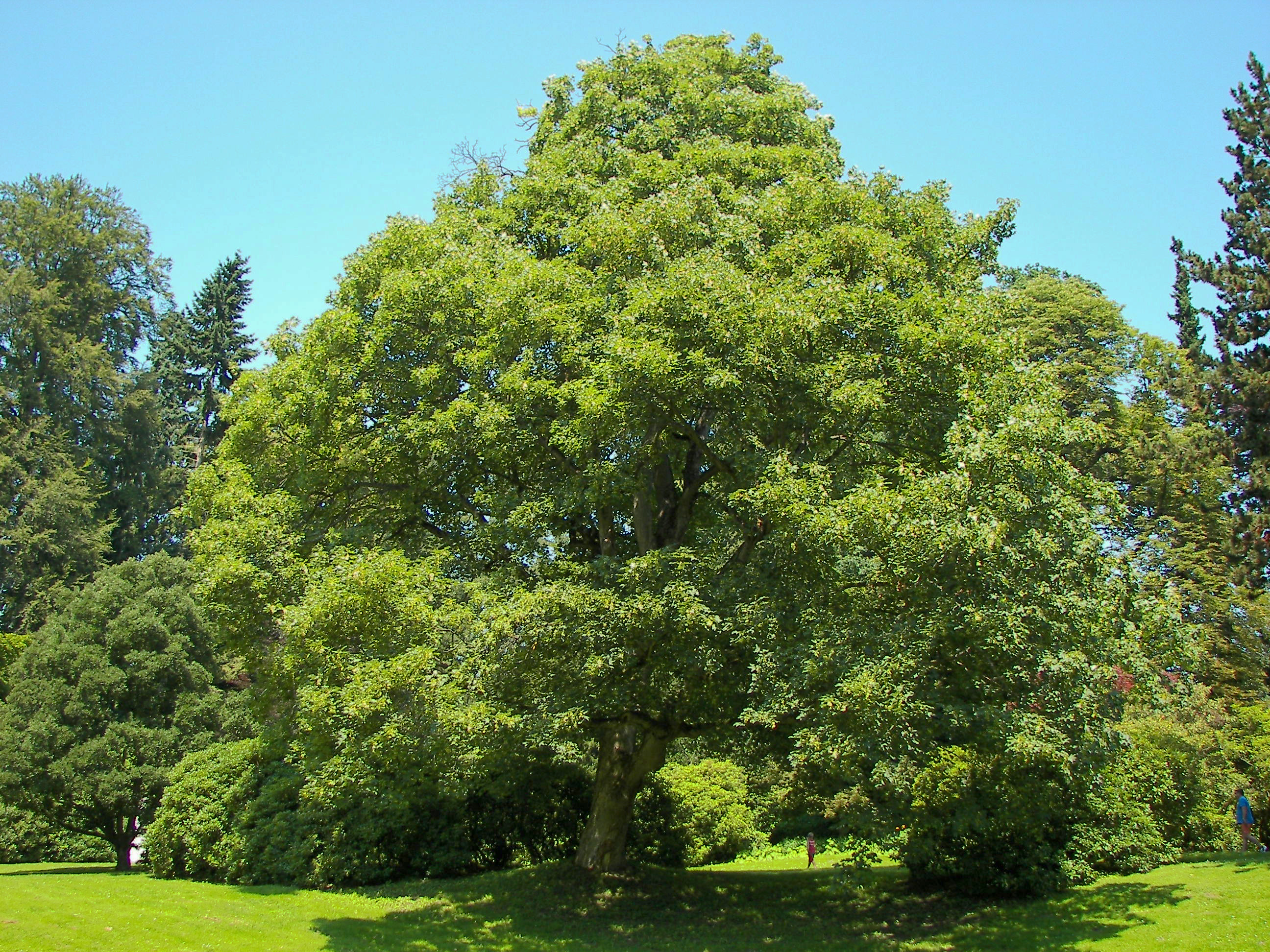
- Acer pseudoplatanus in the Bergpark Wilhelmshöhe, Kassel, Germany

Conservation status
- Least Concern (IUCN 3.1)

Scientific classification
- Kingdom: Plantae
- Clade: Tracheophytes
- Clade: Angiosperms
- Clade: Eudicots
- Clade: Rosids
- Order: Sapindales
- Family: Sapindaceae
- Genus: Acer
- Section: Acer sect. Acer
- Series: Acer ser. Acer
- Species: A. pseudoplatanus

Binomial name
- Acer pseudoplatanus L.
- Distribution map

Synonyms
- Acer abchasicum Rupr. (1869); Acer atropurpureum Dippel (1892); Acer bohemicum C.Presl ex Opiz. (1852) (invalid name); Acer dittrichii Ortm. (1831); Acer erythrocarpum Dippel (1892); Acer euchlorum Dippel (1892); Acer fieberi Opiz (1852) (invalid name); Acer hybridum Bosc (1821); Acer majus Gray (1821); Acer melliodorum Opiz (1852); Acer montanum Garsault (1764) (invalid name); Acer opizii Ortmann ex Opiz. (1852); Acer opulifolium Thuill. (1790) (illegitimate name); Acer procerum Salisb. (1796); Acer purpureum Dippel (1892); Acer quinquelobum Gilib. (1782) (invalid name); Acer rafinesquianum Dippel (1892); Acer villosum C. Presl (1822); Acer wondracekii Opiz (1852); Acer worleei Dippel (1892)

= Acer pseudoplatanus =

Species of maple tree

Acer pseudoplatanus, known as the sycamore in the British Isles and as the sycamore maple in the United States, is a species of maple native to Central Europe and Western Asia. It is a large deciduous, broad-leaved tree, tolerant of wind and coastal exposure.

The sycamore can grow to a height of about 35 metres (115 feet) and the branches form a broad, rounded crown. The bark is grey, smooth when young and later flaking in irregular patches. The leaves grow on long leafstalks and are large and palmate, with five large radiating lobes. The flowers are greenish-yellow and hang in dangling flowerheads called panicles. They produce copious amounts of pollen and nectar that are attractive to insects. The winged seeds or samaras are borne in pairs and twirl to the ground when ripe. They germinate freely in the following spring.

Although native to an area ranging from France eastward to Ukraine, northern Turkey and the Caucasus, and southward to the mountains of Italy and northern Iberia, the sycamore establishes itself easily from seed and was introduced to the British Isles by 1500. It is now naturalised there and in other parts of Europe, North America, Australia and New Zealand, where it may become an invasive species.

In its native range, the sycamore is associated with a biodiverse range of invertebrates and fungi, but these are not always present in areas to which it has been introduced. It is sometimes planted in urban areas for its value as an ornamental. It produces a hard-wearing, creamy-white close-grained timber that is used for making musical instruments, furniture, joinery, wood flooring and kitchen utensils. It also makes good firewood. The rising sap in spring has been used to extract sugar and make alcoholic and non-alcoholic drinks, and can be processed into a syrup similar to that of the sugar maple. Bees often collect the nectar to make honey.

== Description ==
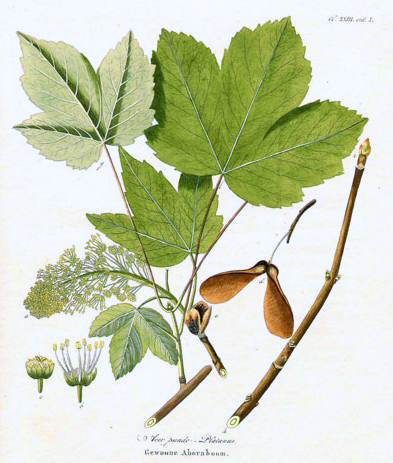
Illustration of twigs, buds, leaves, flowers and fruits

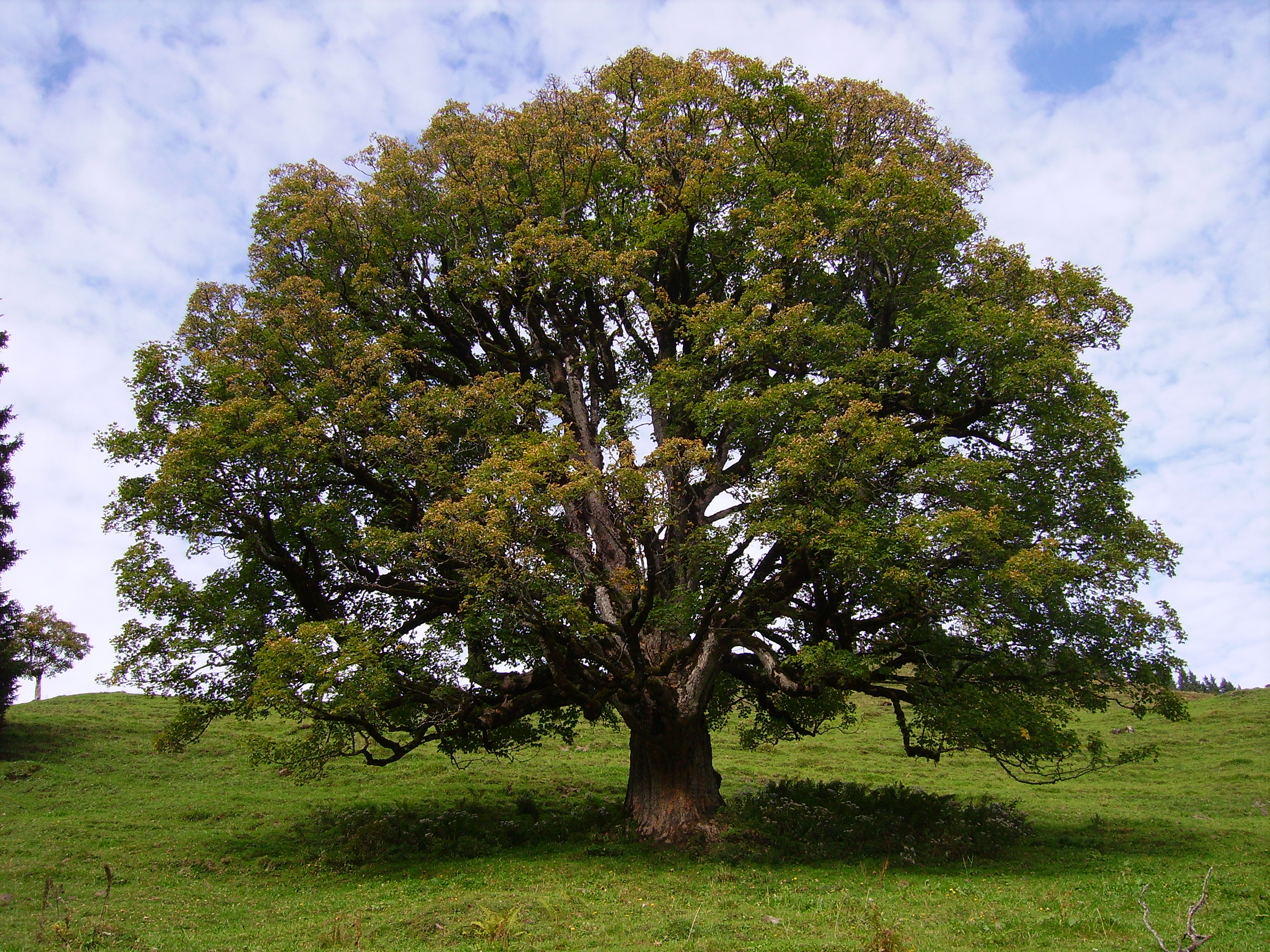
Acer pseudoplatanus can form a broad, domed crown.

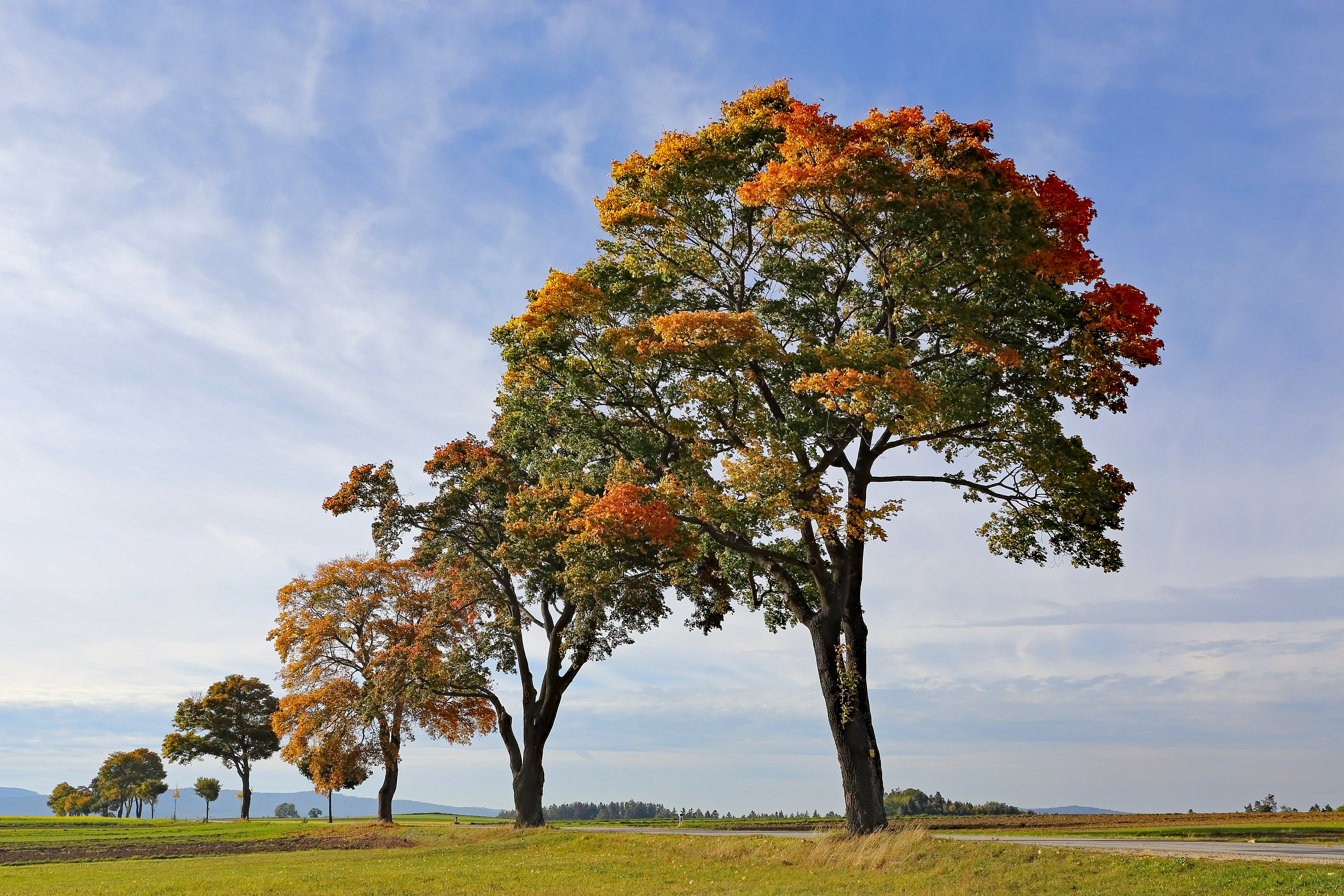
Acer pseudoplatanus in early October in Lower Austria

The sycamore is a large, broad-leaved deciduous tree that reaches 20–35 metres (66–115 feet) tall at maturity, the branches forming a broad, domed crown. The bark of young trees is smooth and grey but becomes rougher with age and breaks up into scales, exposing the pale-brown-to-pinkish inner bark.

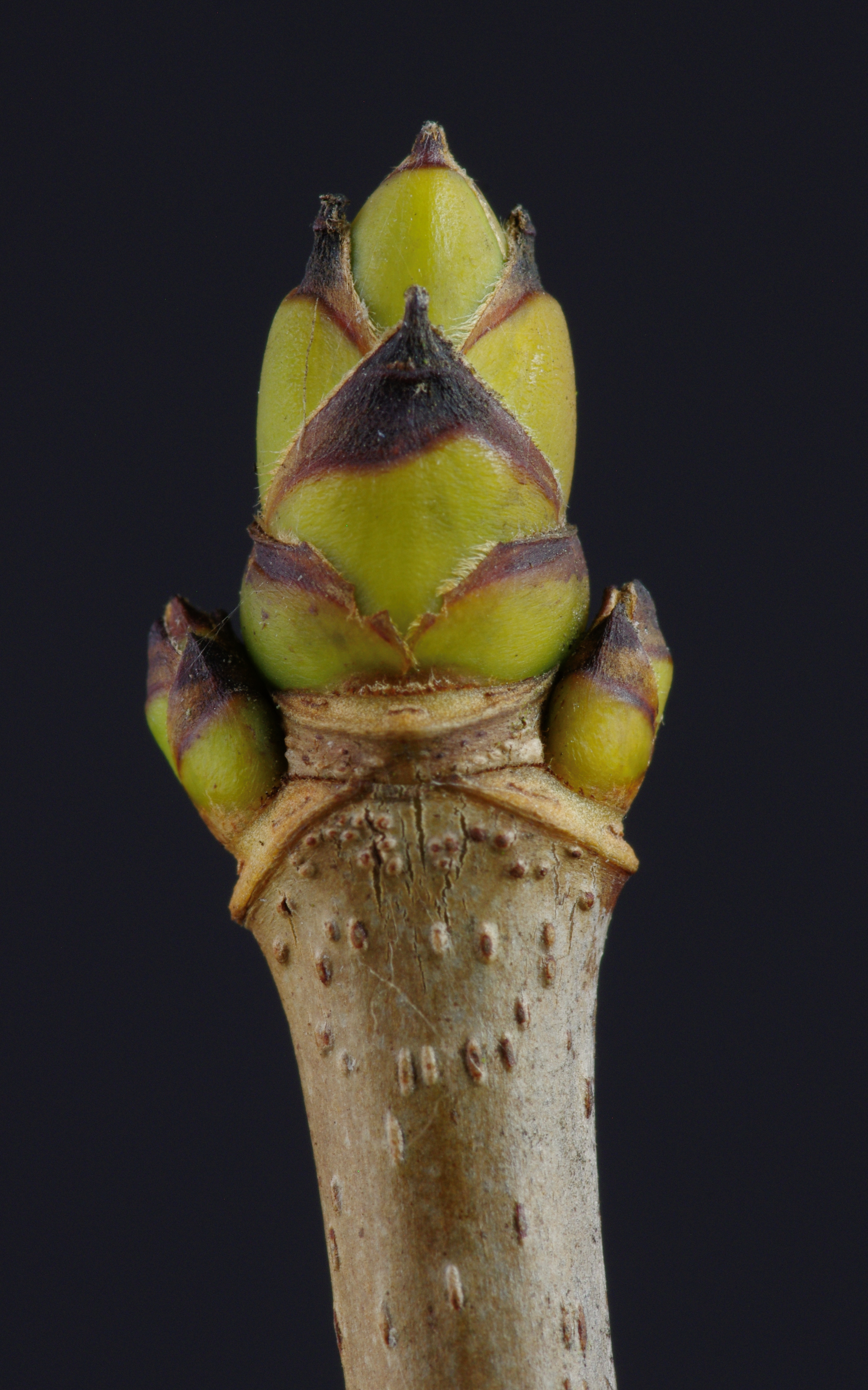
Sycamore shoot tip in winter with a green terminal bud and paired green lateral buds

The buds are produced in opposite pairs, ovoid (approximately oval in shape) and pointed, with the bud scales (the modified leaves that enclose and protect the bud) green, edged in dark brown and with dark brown tips, 0.5–1 centimetre (1/4–3/8 in). When the leaves are shed they leave horseshoe-shaped marks called leaf scars on the stem. The leaves are opposite, large, 10 to 25 cm (4 to 10 in) long and broad, palmate with 5 pointed lobes that are coarsely toothed or serrated. They have a leathery texture with thick veins protruding on the underside. They are dark green in colour with a paler underside. Some cultivars have purple-tinged or yellowish leaves. The leaf stalk or petiole is 5 to 15 cm (2 to 6 in) long, is often tinged red with no stipules or leaf-like structures at the base.

The functionally monoecious or dioecious yellow-green flowers are produced after the leaves in early summer, in May or June in the British Isles, on pendulous panicles 10 to 20 cm (4 to 8 in) long with about 60–100 flowers on each stalk. The fruits are paired winged seeds or samaras, the seeds 5 to 10 mm (1/4 to 3/8 in) in diameter, each with a wing 20 to 40 mm (3/4 to 1 5/8 in) long developed as an extension of the ovary wall. The wings are held at about right angles to each other, distinguishing them from those of A. platanoides and A. campestre, in which the wings are almost opposite, and from those of A. saccharum, in which they are almost parallel. When shed, the wing of the samara catches the wind and rotates the fruit as it falls, slowing its descent and enabling the wind to disperse it further from the parent tree. The seeds are mature in autumn about four months after pollination.

The sycamore is tetraploid (each cell having four sets of chromosomes, 2n=52), whereas A. campestre and A. platanoides are diploid (with 2 sets of chromosomes, 2n=26).

=== Botany ===
Sycamore trees produce their flowers in hanging branched clusters known as panicles that contain a variety of different flower types. Most are morphologically bisexual, with both male and female organs, but function as if they were unisexual. Some are both morphologically and functionally male, others morphologically bisexual but function as males, and still others are morphologically bisexual but function as females. All of the flower types can produce pollen, but the pollen from functionally female flowers does not germinate. All flowers produce nectar, the functionally female flowers producing it in greater volume and with a higher sugar content.

Sycamore trees are very variable across their wide range and have strategies to prevent self-pollination, which is undesirable because it limits the genetic variation of the progeny and may depress their vigour. Most inflorescences are formed of a mixture of functionally male and functionally female flowers. On any one tree, one or other of these flower types opens first and the other type opens later. Some trees may be male-starters in one year and female-starters in another. The change from one sex to the other may take place on different dates in different parts of the crown, and different trees in any one population may come into bloom over the course of several weeks, so that cross-pollination is encouraged, although self-pollination may not be completely prevented.

The sycamore may hybridise with other species in Acer section Acer, including with A. heldreichii where their natural ranges overlap and with A. velutinum. Intersectional hybrids with A. griseum (Acer section Trifoliata) are also known, in which the basal lobes of the leaf are reduced in size, making the leaves appear almost three-lobed (trifoliate).

== Taxonomy ==
Acer pseudoplatanus was first described by the Swedish naturalist Carl Linnaeus in his Species Plantarum in 1753. It is the type species in the maple genus Acer, which is in the soapberry family Sapindaceae. Many forms and varieties have been proposed, including natural varieties such as var. macrocarpum Spach, var. microcarpum Spach, and var. tomentosum Tausch, and forms such as f. erythrocarpum (Carrière) Pax, f. purpureum (Loudon) Rehder, and f. variegatum (Weston) Rehder. These are all now considered to be synonyms of Acer pseudoplatanus L.

=== Etymology ===
The specific name pseudoplatanus refers to the superficial similarity of the leaves and bark of the sycamore to those of plane trees in the genus Platanus, the prefix pseudo- (from Ancient Greek) meaning "false". However, the two genera are in different families that are only distantly related. Acer and Platanus differ in the position in which leaves are attached to the stem (alternate in Platanus, paired or opposite in Acer) and in their fruit, which are spherical clusters in Platanus and paired samaras (winged fruit) in Acer.

The common name "sycamore" was originally applied to the fig species Ficus sycomorus, the sycamore or sycomore referred to in the Bible, that is native to Africa and Southwest Asia. Other common names for the tree include false plane-tree, great maple, Scottish maple, mount maple, mock-plane, or Celtic maple.

== Distribution ==
The sycamore is native to central and eastern Europe and western Asia. Its natural range includes Albania, Austria, Belgium, Bulgaria, Czech Republic, France, Georgia, Germany, Greece, Hungary, Italy, Lithuania, Netherlands, Poland, Portugal, Romania, southern Russia, Spain, Switzerland, East Thrace and the former Yugoslavia. Reports of it occurring in eastern Turkey have been found to refer to A. heldreichii subsp. trautvetteri. It was probably introduced into Britain in the Tudor period by 1500 and was first recorded in the wild in 1632 in Kent. The date of its first introduction into Ireland is unclear, but the oldest specimen in Ireland is in County Cavan and dates from the 17th century. It was introduced into Sweden around 1770 with seeds obtained from Holland.

The lack of old native names for it has been used to demonstrate its absence in Britain before introduction in around 1487, but this is challenged by the presence of an old Scottish Gaelic name for the tree, fior chrann which suggests a longer presence in Scotland at least as far back as the Gaelic settlement at Dál Riata in the late 6th and early 7th centuries. This would make it either an archaeophyte (a naturalised tree introduced by humans before 1500) or perhaps native if it can be seen to have reached Scotland without human intervention. At the moment it is usually classified as a neophyte, a plant that is naturalised but arrived with humans on or after the year 1500. Today, the sycamore is present in 3,461 (89.7%) of hectads in Britain, more than any native tree species.

The sycamore has been introduced to suitable locations outside Europe as an attractive tree for park, street or garden. These include the United States, Canada, Australia (Victoria and Tasmania), Chile and New Zealand, Patagonia and the laurel forests of Madeira and the Azores. At the time of its introduction it was probably not appreciated that its prolific production of seeds might one day cause a problem to the landscape as it spread and out-competed native species. The tree is now considered to be an environmental weed in some parts of Australia (Yarra Ranges, Victoria) and also Mount Macedon, near Daylesford, parts of the Dandenong Ranges, where it is naturalised in the eucalypt forests. The sycamore is also scattered in north-eastern Tasmania and also at Taroona, near the Derwent River, in southern Hobart. It is considered to be an invasive species in New Zealand, Norway, and environmentally sensitive locations in the United Kingdom.

In about 1870, the sycamore was introduced into the US, and was planted in New York state and New Jersey. It was later cultivated as a park or street tree in New England and the Mid-Atlantic states. By the early part of the 21st century, it was naturalised in fourteen states (Connecticut, Delaware, Illinois, Kentucky, Maine, Michigan, North Carolina, New Jersey, New York, Pennsylvania, Rhode Island and Washington, D.C.), and in the Canadian provinces of British Columbia, New Brunswick, Nova Scotia and Ontario. The US Department of Agriculture considers it an invasive species.

== Ecology ==
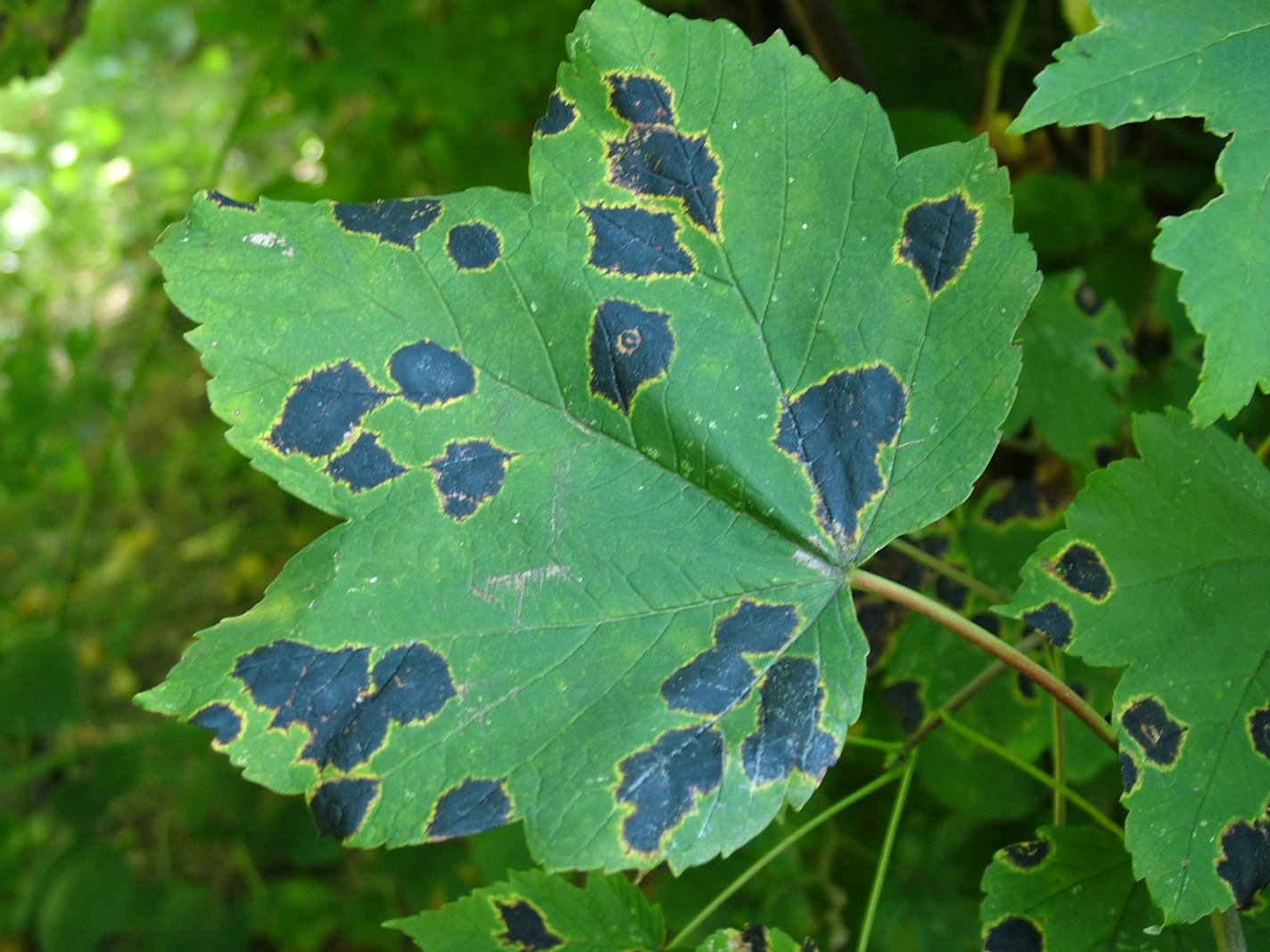
Leaf showing tar spot

In its native range, the sycamore is a natural component of birch (Betula sp.), beech (Fagus sp.) and fir (Abies sp.) forests. It readily invades disturbed habitats such as forest plantations, abandoned farmland and brownfield land, railway lines and roadsides verges, hedgerows, native and semi-natural woodland. In New Zealand, it invades the high country tussock grassland. As an introduced, invasive species, it may degrade the laurel forest in Madeira and Portugal and is a potential threat to the rare endemic Madeiran orchid, Dactylorhiza foliosa.

It is tolerant of a wide range of soil types and pH, except heavy clay, and is at its best on nutrient-rich, slightly calcareous soils. The roots of the sycamore form highly specific beneficial mycorrhizal associations with the fungus Glomus hoi, which promotes phosphorus uptake from the soil. Sycamore mycorrhizas are of the internal arbuscular mycorrhizal type, in which the fungus grows within the tissues of the root and forms branched, tree-like structures within the cells of the root cortex.

The larvae of a number of species of moth use the leaves as a food source. These include the sycamore moth (Acronicta aceris), the maple prominent (Ptilodon cucullina) and the plumed prominent (Ptilophora plumigera). The horse-chestnut leaf miner (Cameraria ohridella) occasionally lays its eggs on the sycamore, although 70% of the larvae do not survive beyond the second instar. The leaves attract aphids, and also the ladybirds and hoverflies that feed on them. The flowers produce copious amounts of nectar and pollen and are attractive to bees and other insects, and the seeds are eaten by small mammals such as voles and birds. As an introduced plant, in Britain the sycamore has a relatively small associated insect fauna of about 15 species, but it does have a larger range of leafhoppers than does the native field maple.

The tree may also be attacked by the horse chestnut scale insect (Pulvinaria regalis), which sucks sap from the trunk and branches, but does not cause serious damage to the tree. Sometimes squirrels will strip the bark off branches, girdling the stem; as a result whole branches may die, leaving brown, wilted leaves.

The sycamore gall mite Eriophyes macrorhynchus produces small red galls, similar to those of the nail gall mite Eriophyes tiliae, on leaves of sycamore and field maple, Acer campestris from April onwards. Another mite, Aceria pseudoplatani causes a 'sycamore felt gall' on the underside of leaves of both sycamore and Norway maple (Acer platanoides). The sycamore aphid Drepanosiphum platanoidis sucks sap from buds and foliage, producing large quantities of sticky honeydew that contaminate foliage, cars and garden furniture beneath.

The sycamore is susceptible to sooty bark disease, caused by the fungus Cryptostroma corticale. This causes wilting of the crown and the death of branches. Rectangular patches of bark become detached exposing thick layers of black fungal spores. The fungus may be present in the heartwood without symptoms for many years, working its way towards the bark following long, hot summers. The spores are hyper-allergenic and cause a condition called maple bark stripper's disease, a hypersensitivity pneumonitis. Less serious is the fungus Rhytisma acerinum which often forms the disease known as tar spot, in which black spots with yellow margins form on the foliage. The leaves may fall prematurely but the vigour of the tree is little affected. Sycamore leaf spot, caused by the fungus Cristulariella depraedans, results in pale blotches on leaves which later dry up and fall. This disease can cause moderate leaf loss but trees are little affected in the long run.

Fungal species Coniothyrium ferrarisianum has also been isolated from leaves of Acer pseudoplatanus in Italy in 1958.

== Cultivation ==
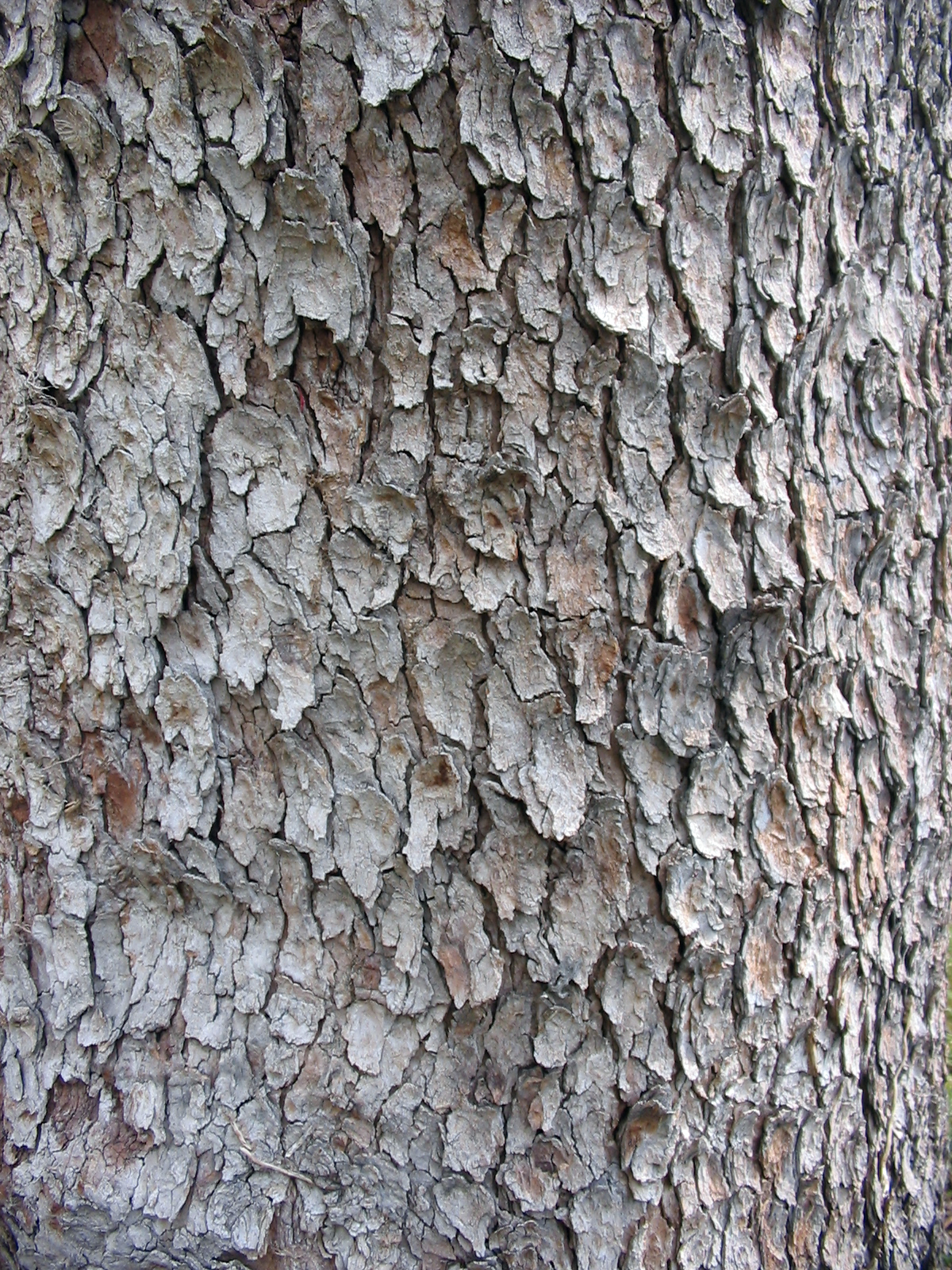
Bark on a mature tree

Sycamore self-seeds very vigorously, the seeds germinating en masse in the spring so that there is little, or no, seed bank in the soil. It is readily propagated from seed in cultivation, but varieties cannot be relied on to breed true. Special cultivars such as A. pseudoplatanus 'Brilliantissimum' may be propagated by grafting. This variety is notable for the bright salmon-pink colour of the young foliage and is the only sycamore cultivar to have gained the Royal Horticultural Society's Award of Garden Merit. A rare weeping form with dangling branches, A. pseudoplatanus var. pendulum, was first sold by Knight & Perry's exotic nursery in Chelsea, England, before 1850 when the name was published by W. H. Baxter in the Supplement to Loudon's Hortus Brittanicus, but no specimens of this cultivar are known to survive.

The sycamore is noted for its tolerance of wind, urban pollution, salt spray, and low summer temperatures, which makes it a popular tree for planting in cities, along roads treated with salt in winter, and in coastal localities. It is cultivated and widely naturalised north of its native range in Northern Europe, notably in the British Isles and Scandinavia north to Tromsø, Norway (seeds can ripen as far north as Vesterålen); Reykjavík, Iceland; and Tórshavn on the Faroe Islands. It now occurs throughout the British Isles, having been probably introduced in the 16th century.

Sycamores make new growth from the stump or roots if cut down and can therefore be coppiced to produce poles and other types of small timber. Its coppice stools grow comparatively rapidly, reaching as much as 1.3 m (4 1/2 ft) in length in the first year after initial harvesting.

It is grown as a species for medium-to-large bonsai in many areas of Europe, where some fine specimens can be found.

== Toxicity ==
Horses eating seeds or emergent seedlings of A. pseudoplatanus can suffer from an often fatal condition of atypical myopathy.

== Uses ==
Sycamore is planted in parks for ornamental purposes, and sometimes as a street tree, for its tolerance of air pollution makes it suitable for use in urban plantings. Owing to its tolerance to wind, it has often been planted in coastal and exposed areas as a windbreak.

It produces a hard-wearing, white or cream close-grained timber that turns golden with age. The wood can be worked and sawn in any direction and is used for making musical instruments, furniture, joinery, wood flooring and parquetry. Because it is non-staining, is used for kitchen utensils, wooden spoons, bowls, rolling pins and chopping boards. In Scotland it has traditionally been used for making fine boxes, sometimes in association with contrasting, dark-coloured laburnum wood.

Occasionally, trees produce wood with a wavy grain, greatly increasing the value for decorative veneers. The wood is a medium weight for a hardwood, weighing 630 kg per cubic metre. It is a traditional wood for use in making the backs, necks and scrolls of violins, and also for flamenco guitars. The wood is often marketed as rippled sycamore. Whistles can be made from straight twigs when the rising sap allows the bark to be separated, and these, and sycamore branches, are used in customs associated with early May in Cornwall. The wood is used for fuel, being easy to saw and to split with an axe, producing a hot flame and good embers when burnt.

In Scotland, sycamores were once a favoured tree for hangings, because their lower branches rarely broke under the strain. Both male and female flowers produce abundant nectar, which makes a fragrant, delicately flavoured and pale-coloured honey. The nectar and copious dull yellow ochre pollen are collected by honeybees as food sources. The sap rises vigorously in the spring and like that of sugar maple can be tapped to provide a refreshing drink, as a source of sugar and to make syrup or beer.

== Notable specimens ==
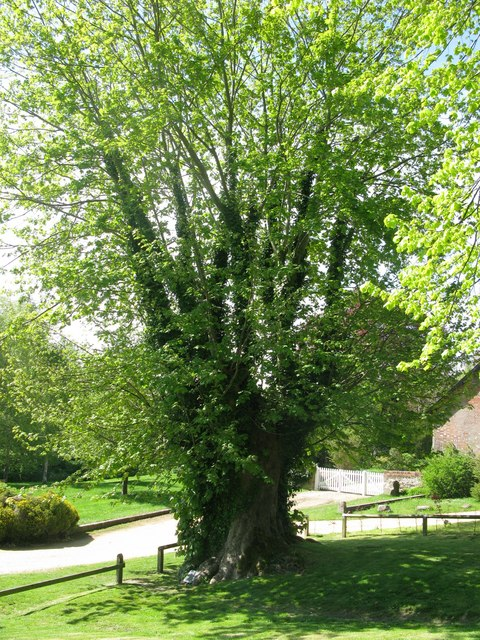
The Martyrs' Tree, a sycamore at Tolpuddle in Dorset, England, is regarded by some as the birthplace of the British trades union movement.

=== Tolpuddle Martyrs' Tree ===
Under this sycamore tree at Tolpuddle in Dorset, England, six agricultural labourers, known as the Tolpuddle Martyrs, formed an early trades union in 1834. They were found to have breached the Unlawful Oaths Act 1797 and were transported to Australia. The subsequent public outcry led to their release and return. The tree now has a girth of 5.9 metres (19 feet, 4 inches) and a 2005 study dated the tree to 1680. The tree is cared for by the National Trust, which has pollarded the tree in 2002 and 2014.

=== Corstorphine Sycamore Tree ===
An ancient sycamore (sometimes described as a "plane") with distinctive yellow foliage formerly stood in the village of Corstorphine, now a suburb of Edinburgh, Scotland. The tree was reputedly planted in the 15th century and is named as the form Acer pseudoplatanus f. corstorphinense Schwer. Not only was it claimed to be the "largest sycamore in Scotland" but also the scene of James Lord Forrester's murder in 1679. The tree was blown down in a storm on Boxing Day 1998, but a replacement, grown from a cutting, now stands in the churchyard of Corstorphine Kirk. The tree is commemorated in the badge of the Corstorphine Bowling Club of Edinburgh, designed in 1950 to feature the Corstorphine sycamore tree and a single horn, and redesigned in 1991 for the club's centenary.

=== Newbattle Abbey sycamore ===
The Newbattle Abbey sycamore near Dalkeith, planted in 1550, was the specimen with the earliest known planting date in Scotland. It had achieved a girth of 5 m (16 ft) and a height of 26 m (85 ft) by the time it was toppled by a gale in May 2006 at the age of 456 years.

=== Clonenagh Money Tree ===
Saint Fintan founded a monastery at Clonenagh in County Laois, Ireland, in the sixth century and it had a spring beside it. This was considered holy and was visited by pilgrims. In the nineteenth century, a Protestant land owner, annoyed at people visiting the site, filled the well in, whereupon the water started to flow into the hollow interior of a sycamore tree on the other side of the road. Filled with amazement, people hung rags on the tree and pressed coins into its trunk as votive offerings and it became known as the "Money Tree". Some years later, it fell down, but new shoots appeared from its base, and the water still welled up. It remains a place of veneration on St Fintan's day, February 17.

=== Sycamore Gap Tree ===
The Sycamore Gap Tree or Robin Hood Tree was a sycamore tree standing next to Hadrian's Wall near Crag Lough in Northumberland, England. It was located in a dramatic dip in the landscape and was a popular photographic subject, described as one of the most photographed trees in the country. It derived its alternative name from featuring in a prominent scene in the 1991 film Robin Hood: Prince of Thieves. According to the National Trust, the tree was planted in the late 19th century and once stood with others, but they had been removed over time, possibly to improve sightlines or for gamekeeping purposes. It was felled overnight on 28 September 2023; a police investigation was launched the following day. The perpetrators Daniel Graham and Adam Carruthers, who carried out the act for 'kicks', were convicted and jailed for four years on 15 July 2025.
