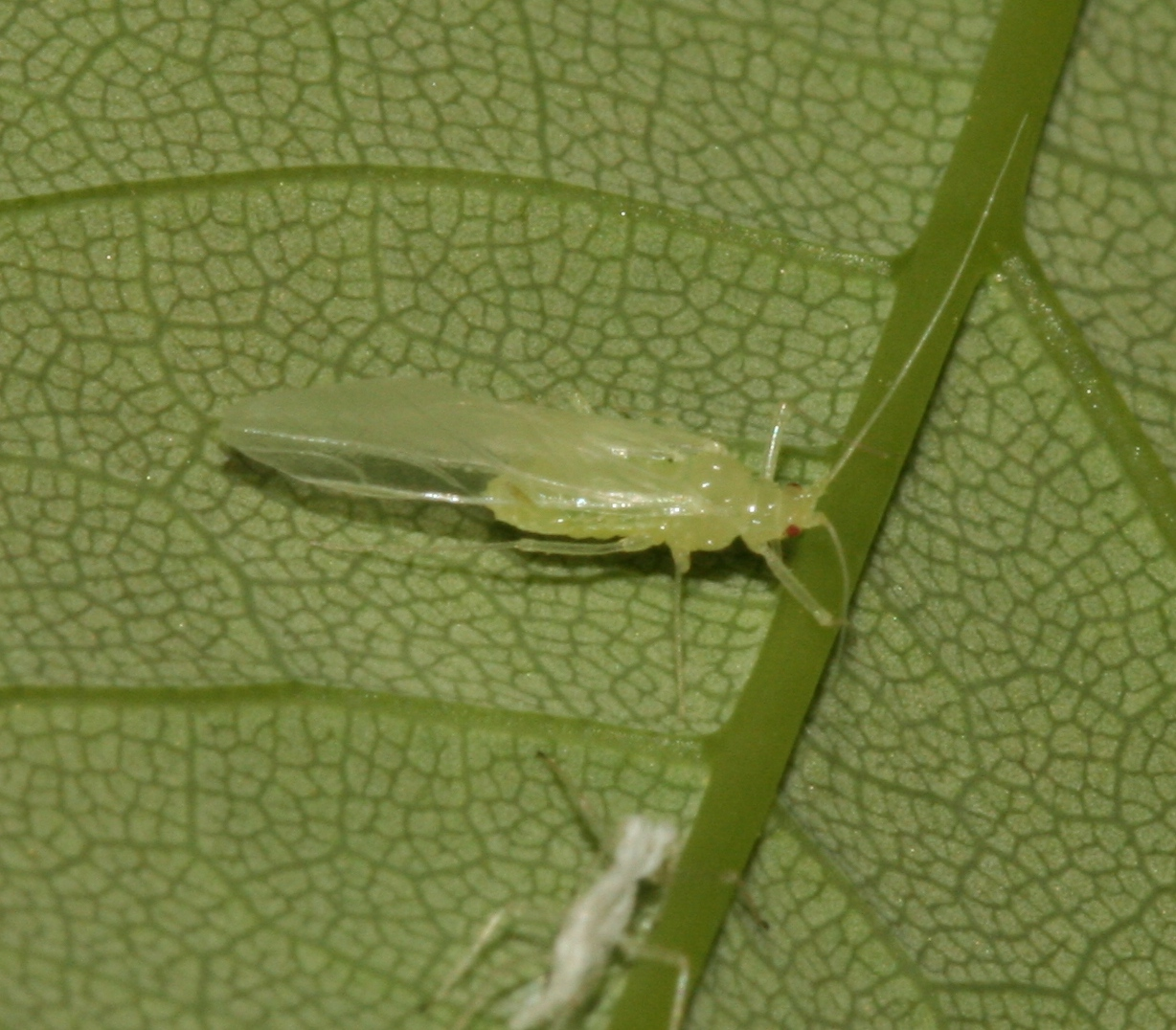
- Aphid, probably Drepanosiphum platanoidis

Scientific classification
- Domain: Eukaryota
- Kingdom: Animalia
- Phylum: Arthropoda
- Class: Insecta
- Order: Hemiptera
- Suborder: Sternorrhyncha
- Family: Aphididae
- Subfamily: Drepanosiphinae; Herrich-Schaeffer, 1857

= Drepanosiphinae =

Subfamily of true bugs

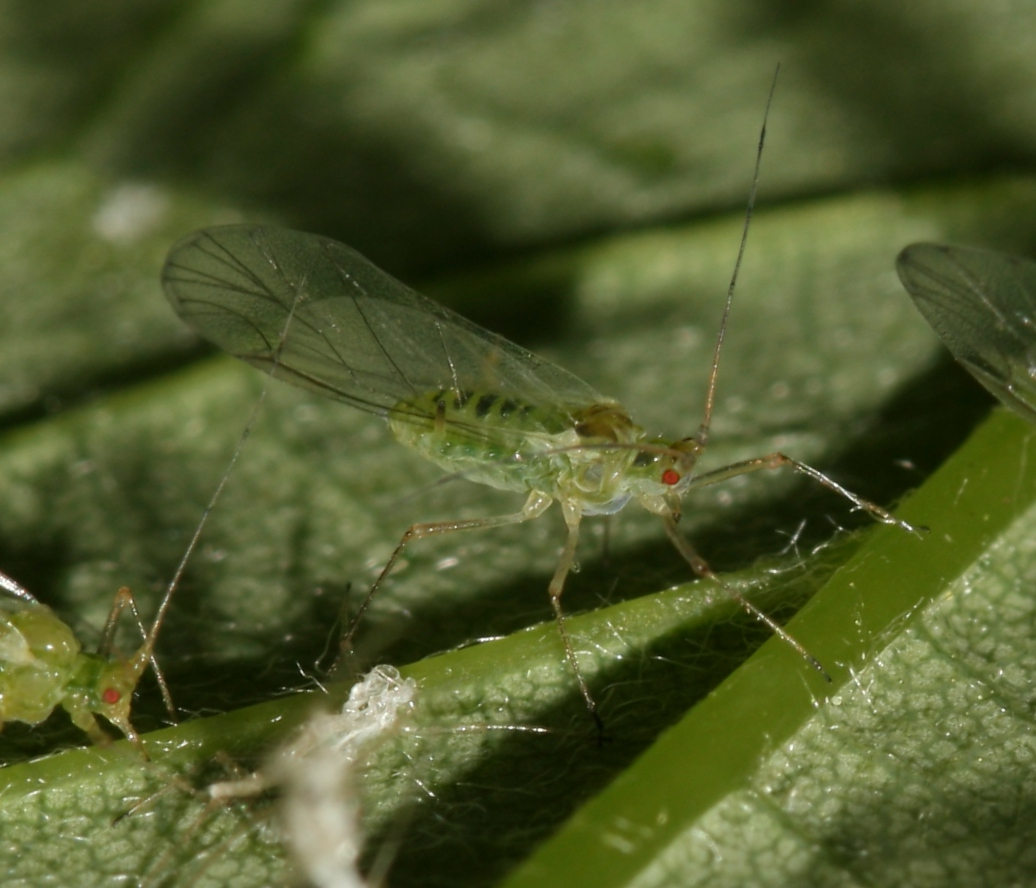
Drepanosiphum platanoidis, Common sycamore aphid

Drepanosiphinae is a subfamily of aphids in the family Aphididae. There are about 13 genera, 8 of which are extinct, and more than 60 described species in Drepanosiphinae.

While a few authors have suggested treating the group as a family, this has not been adopted in the most recent classifications.

== Genera ==
These 13 genera belong to the subfamily Drepanosiphinae:

- Drepanaphis Del Guercio, 1909
- Drepanosiphoniella Davatchi, Hille Ris Lambers & Remaudière, 1957
- Drepanosiphum Koch, 1855
- Shenahweum Hottes & Frison, 1931
- Yamatocallis Matsumura, 1917
- † Aphidopsis Scudder, 1890
- † Electrocallis Heie, 1967
- † Fossilicallis Heie, 2002
- † Hongocallis Wegierek, 2010
- † Megantennaphis Heie, 1967
- † Similidrepan Heie, 2006
- † Siphonophoroides Buckton, 1883
- † Zymus Heie, 1972
