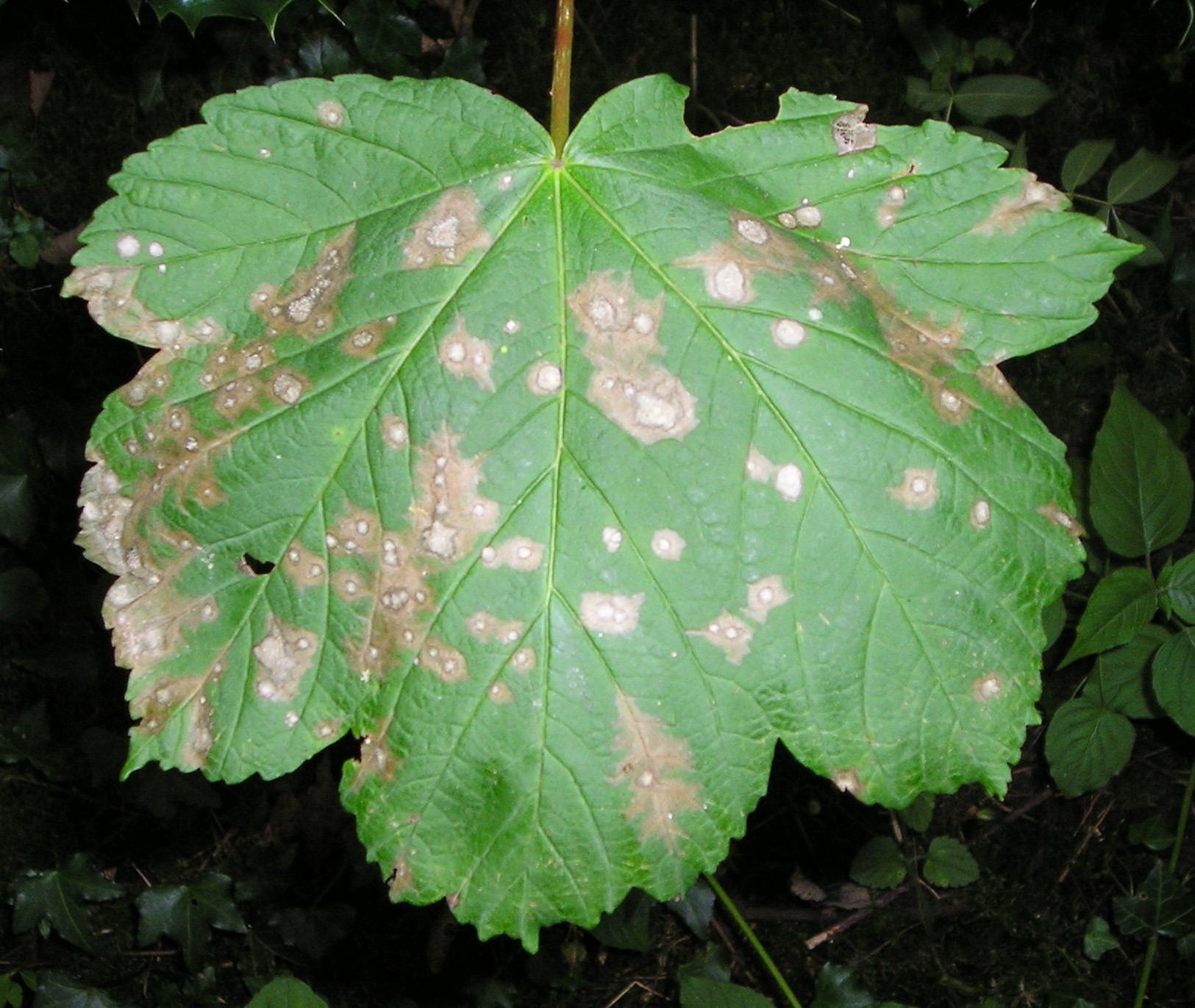
- Sycamore leaf with lesions
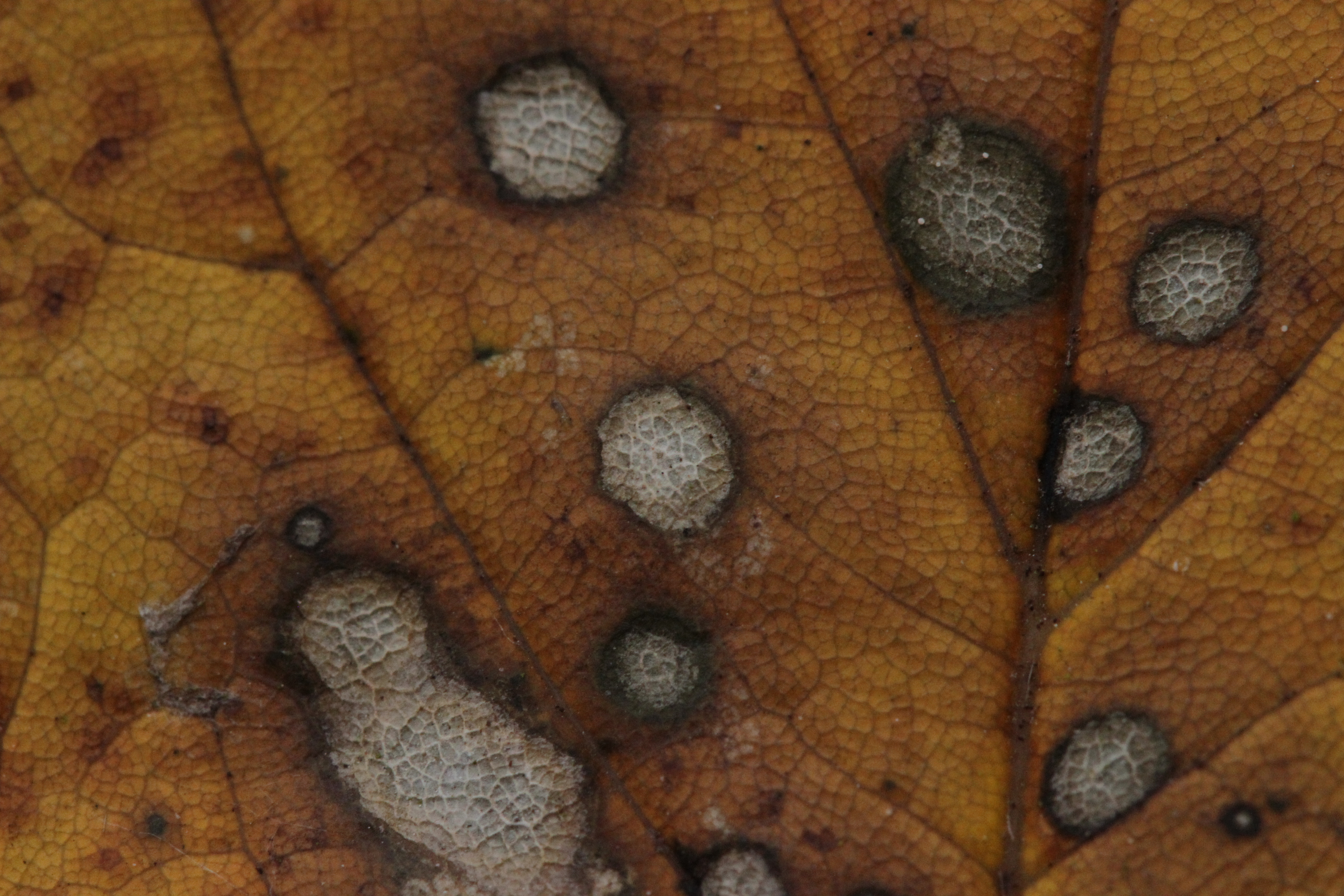

Scientific classification
- Kingdom: Fungi
- Division: Ascomycota
- Class: Leotiomycetes
- Order: Helotiales
- Family: Sclerotiniaceae
- Genus: Cristulariella
- Species: C. depraedans

Binomial name
- Cristulariella depraedans (Cooke) Höhn.

Synonyms
- Polyactis depraedans Cooke, (1885); Botrytis depraedans (Cooke) (1886); Myrioconium depraedans (Cooke)

= Cristulariella depraedans =

Species of fungus

Cristulariella depraedans, commonly known as gray mold spot, sycamore leaf spot or bull's eye spot, is a fungal pathogen that affects maple trees (genus Acer) and certain other woody and herbaceous species. In maples, the foliage becomes affected by small grey lesions which expand and coalesce, the leaves later wilting and falling from the tree early. The disease seems to be associated with cool wet summers, and epidemic years sometimes occur.

== Hosts ==
The fungal pathogen Cristulariella depraedans is found in Europe and North America and mostly affects trees in the genus Acer. Trees affected in Germany and Britain are primarily the sycamore (A. pseudoplatanus) and the Norway maple (A. platanoides), while in North America the most affected are A. platanoides, the red maple (A. rubrum), the sugar maple (A. saccharum), the silver maple (A. saccharinum), the mountain maple (A. spicatum) and the vine maple (A. circinatum). In British Columbia it has also been reported on goatsbeard (Aruncus), and in South and Central America on the bullet tree (Bucida buceras). Studies in Germany between 1996 and 1999 extended the host range and a study published in 2000 recorded the pathogen's occurrence on 21 species of woody and herbaceous plants outside the maple group. It was shown to be present in Poland in a study lasting from 1996 to 2006, and beside Acers, the host range there included hornbeam (Carpinus betulus), dogwood (Cornus sanguinea), hazel (Corylus avellana), beech (Fagus sylvatica), honeysuckle (Lonicera xylosteum), bird cherry (Prunus padus), pedunculate oak (Quercus robur) and lime (Tilia cordata). It is unclear whether this increased host range is because of more intensive study or whether environmental factors have encouraged the fungus to attack new hosts.

== Symptoms ==
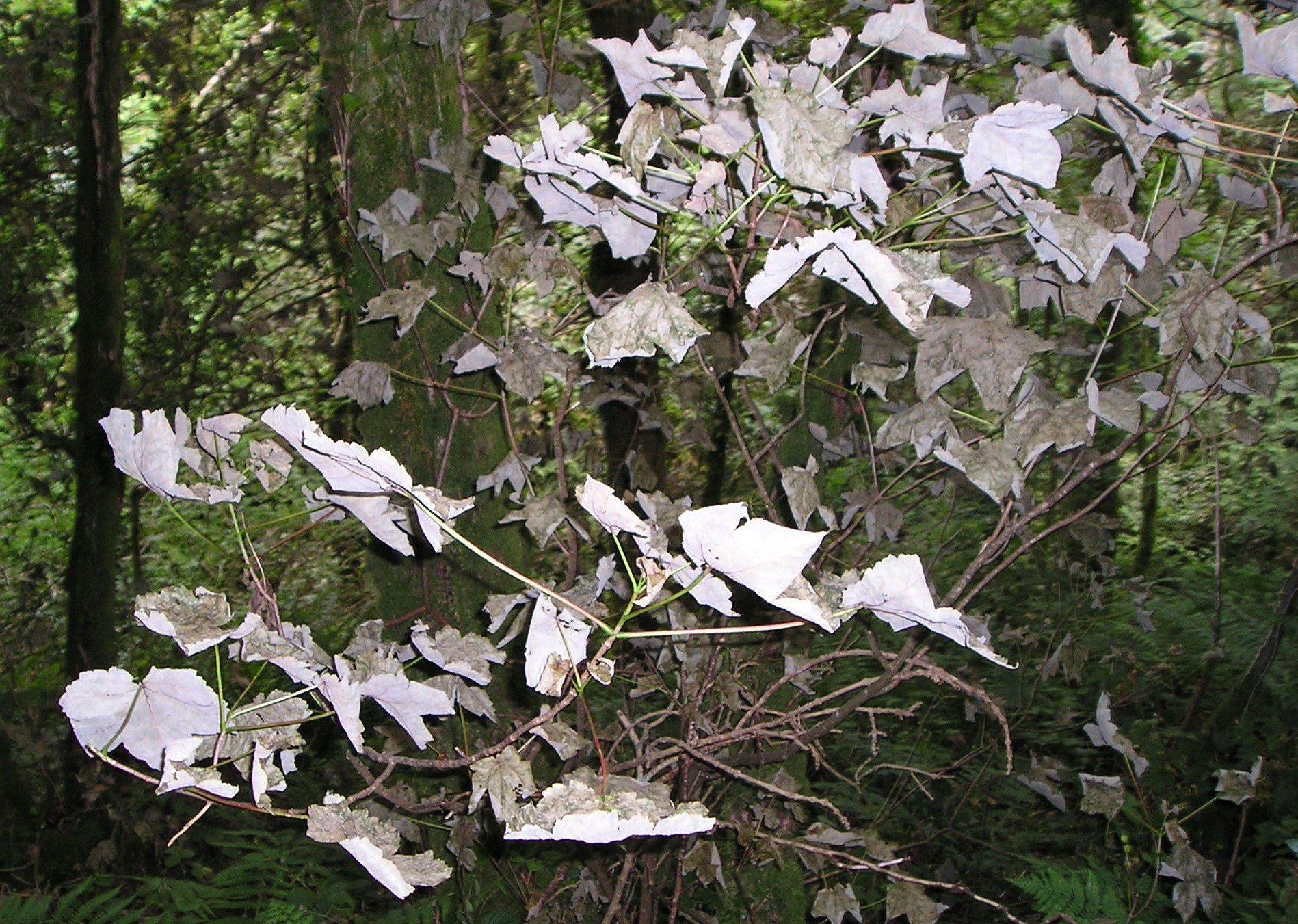
Branch of sycamore tree affected by C. depraedans

The fungus develops on the surface of the leaf blades. At first there are scattered water-soaked grey spots about 1 mm (0.04 in) in diameter, but as the disease progresses, these lesions expand and coalesce and much of the leaf surface may be affected. Fruiting bodies resembling tiny white pinheads develop on either the upper or lower side (or both) of the leaf, particularly near the veins. Small black sclerotia may also form. At some stage the leaves wilt and eventually fall prematurely. In the Polish study, many of the affected host trees had characteristic pigmentation of the necrotic areas, with the centre and periphery of the lesions differing.

== Disease cycle ==
This disease can cause slight to moderate defoliation but the tree usually fully recovers the following year. The disease is infrequent but under suitable conditions of coolness and moisture can be of epidemic proportions. It seems to be associated with cool, wet summers and mostly affects the lower branches of trees.
