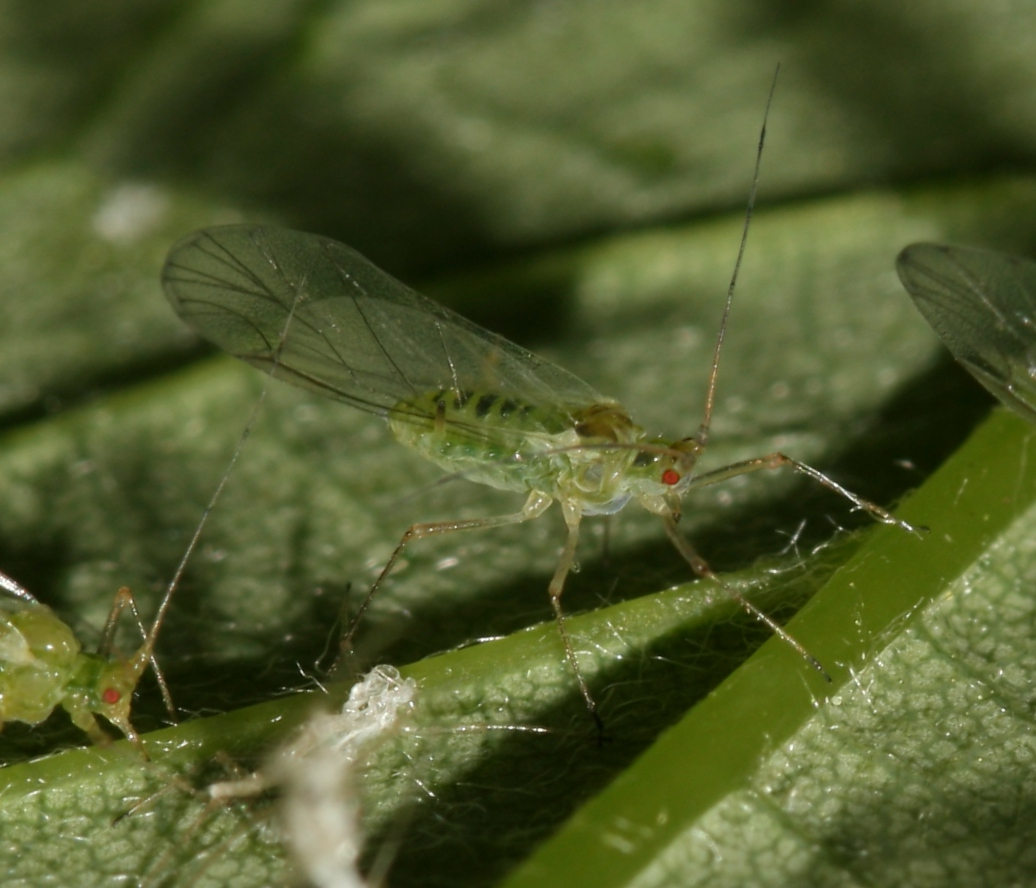

Scientific classification
- Domain: Eukaryota
- Kingdom: Animalia
- Phylum: Arthropoda
- Class: Insecta
- Order: Hemiptera
- Suborder: Sternorrhyncha
- Family: Aphididae
- Genus: Drepanosiphum
- Species: D. platanoidis

Binomial name
- Drepanosiphum platanoidis Schrank, 1801

Synonyms
- Aphis platanoidis

= Drepanosiphum platanoidis =

Species of insect

Drepanosiphum platanoidis is a species of insect, commonly known as the sycamore aphid. It undergoes both parthenogenic and sexual reproduction.
