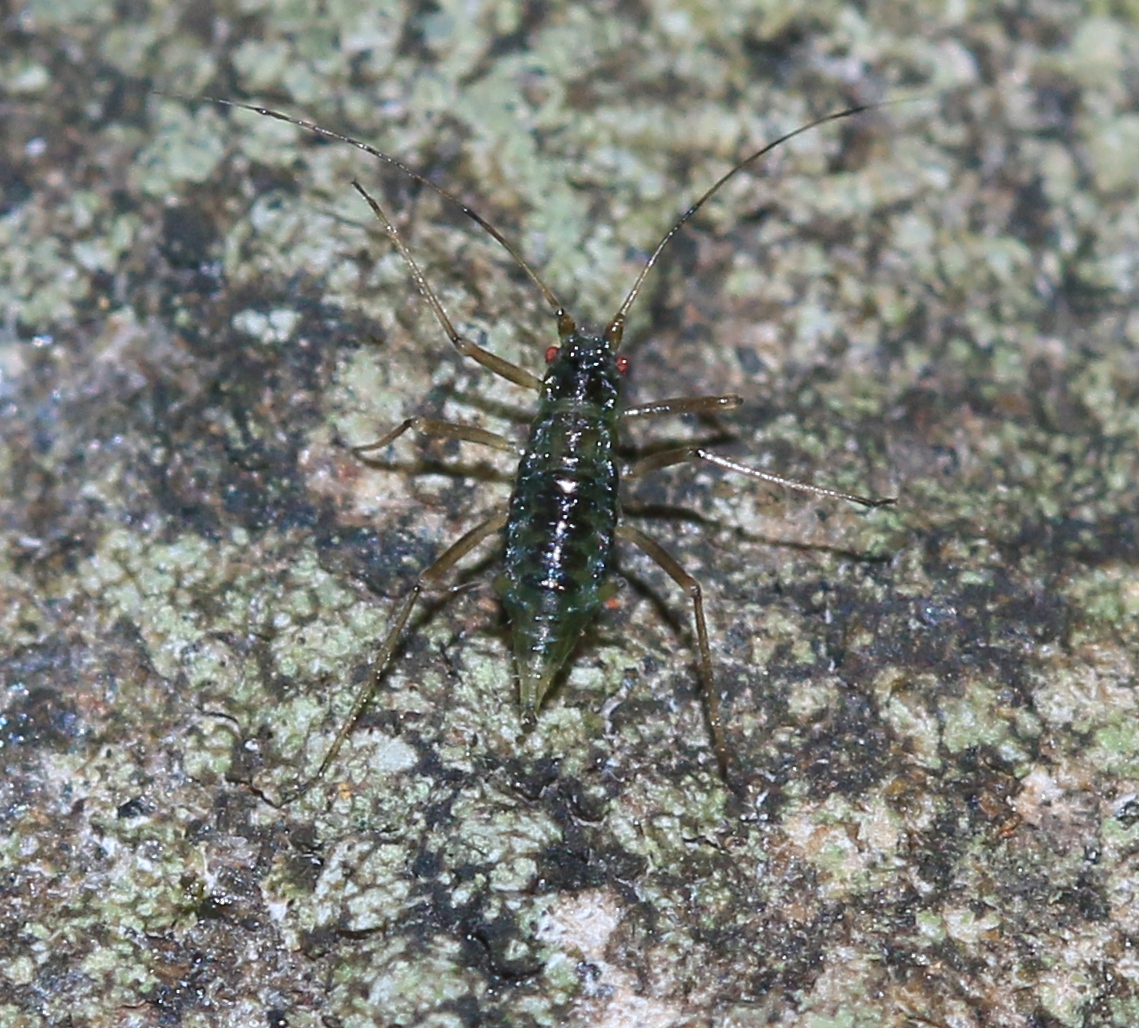
- Drepanosiphum

Scientific classification
- Domain: Eukaryota
- Kingdom: Animalia
- Phylum: Arthropoda
- Class: Insecta
- Order: Hemiptera
- Suborder: Sternorrhyncha
- Family: Aphididae
- Genus: Drepanosiphum; Koch, 1855

= Drepanosiphum =

Genus of true bugs

Drepanosiphum is a genus of true bugs belonging to the family Aphididae.

The species of this genus are found in Europe and Northern America.

Species:

- Drepanosiphum acerinum (Walker, 1848)
- Drepanosiphum aceris Koch, 1855
- Drepanosiphum braggii Gillette, 1907
- Drepanosiphum platanoidis (Schrank, 1801)
- Drepanosiphum oregonensis Granovsky, 1939
