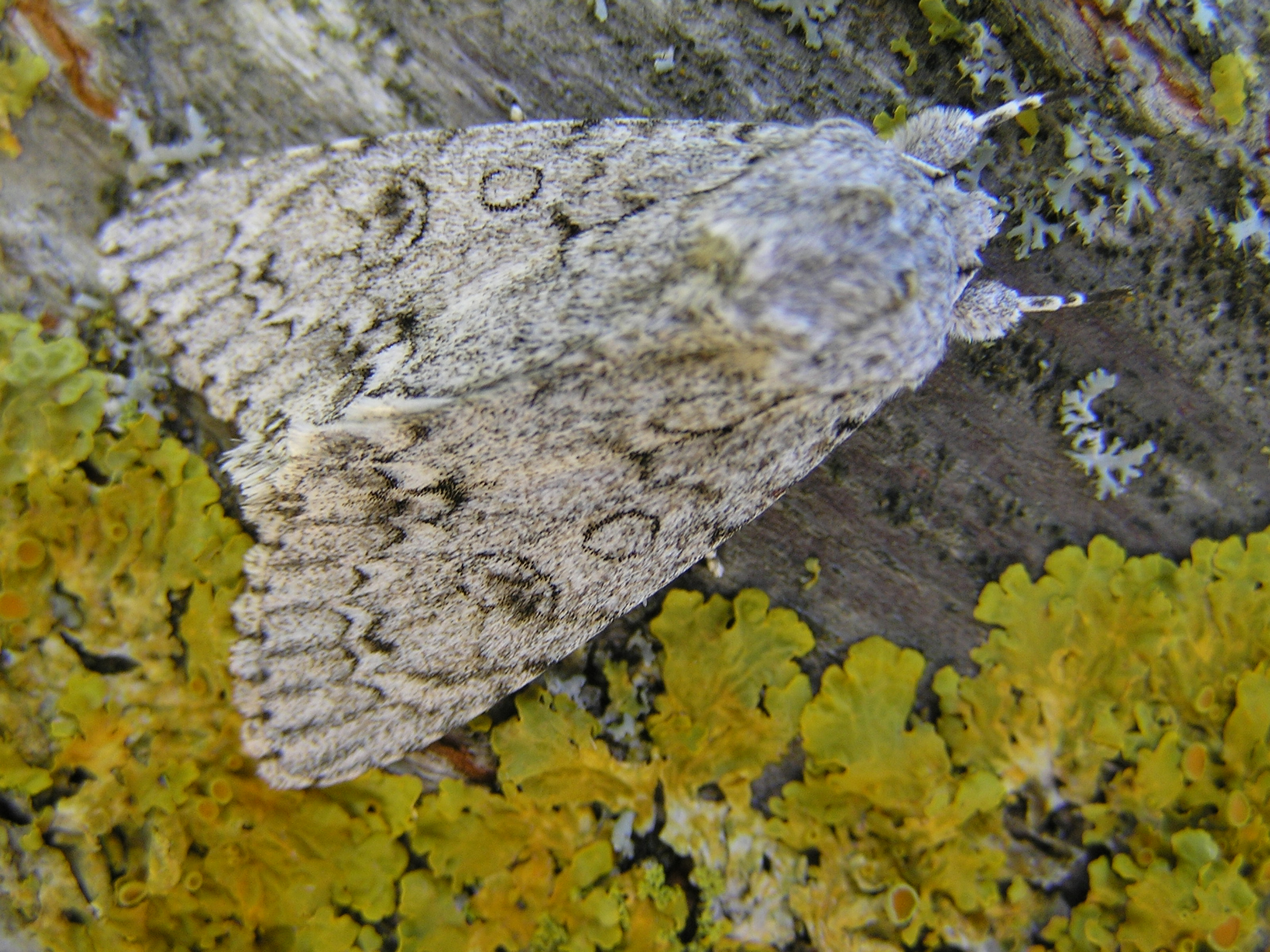

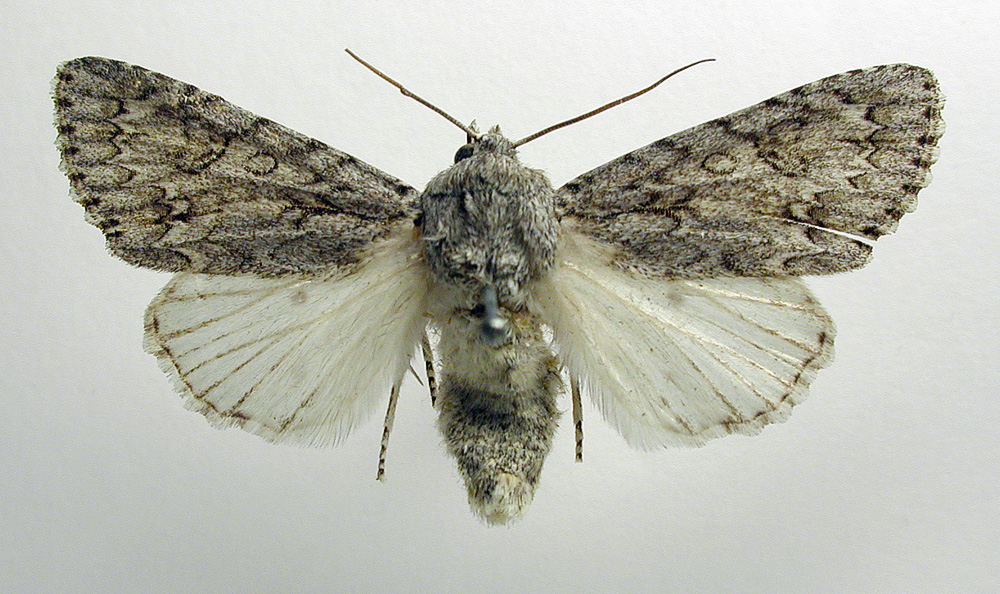

Scientific classification
- Kingdom: Animalia
- Phylum: Arthropoda
- Clade: Pancrustacea
- Class: Insecta
- Order: Lepidoptera
- Superfamily: Noctuoidea
- Family: Noctuidae
- Genus: Acronicta
- Species: A. aceris

Binomial name
- Acronicta aceris (Linnaeus, 1758)

= Sycamore (moth) =

Species of moth

The sycamore (Acronicta aceris) is a moth of the family Noctuidae. The species was first described by Carl Linnaeus in his 1758 10th edition of Systema Naturae. It is distributed through most of Europe, from central England south to Morocco. To the east it is found from the Near East and Middle East to western Asia.

The forewings of this species are pale to dark grey with rather indistinct markings apart from a thin black basal streak. The hindwings are white, sometimes with dark streaks at the margin. The wingspan is 40–45 mm.

== Technical description and variation ==
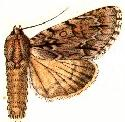
A. a. taurica

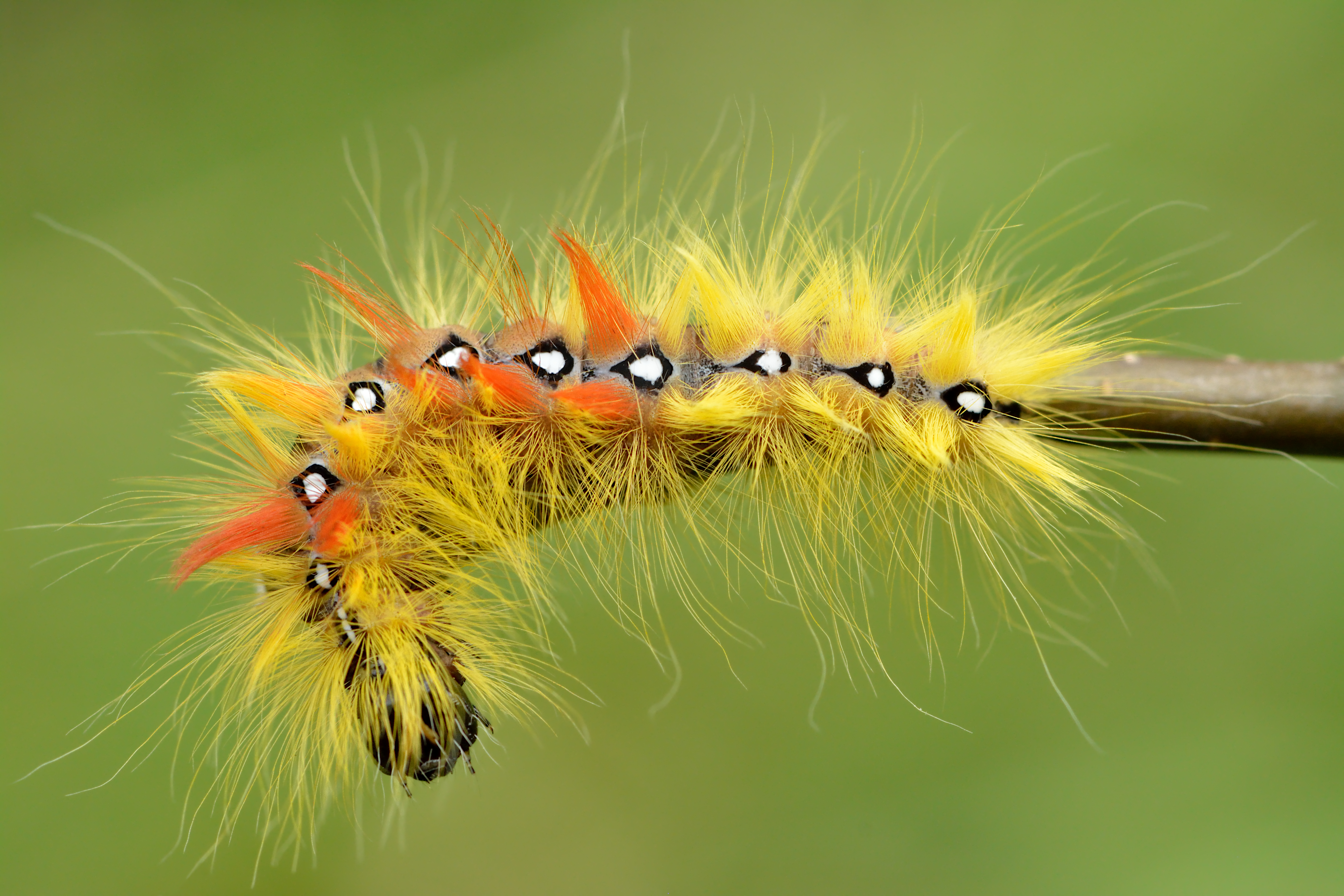
Caterpillar

Forewing whitish grey; basal streak thin and interrupted: a black streak through outer line on submedian fold; hindwing white in male, greyish in female, the veins blackish. — ab. infuscata Haw. (2f) has the whole forewing dark suffused grey. - ab. candelisequa Esp., to which Staudinger wrongly sinks infuscata, seems, from the figure, to be intermediate between it and the type, if it belong here at all: ab. intermedia Tutt (= candelisequa Gn. nec Esp.) is the common British form, with forewing darker, tinged with ochreous, and more distinct markings; ab. judaea Stgr. from Palestine is paler, the forewing greyish white. Larva with diffuse tufts of long yellow or fulvous hairs; a dorsal series of snow white, purple-edged, diamond-shaped spots, sometimes united by a white line: head black.

== Biology ==
The adults fly at night from June to August (Note: The flight season refers to the British Isles. This may vary in other parts of the range.) and are attracted to light and sugar.

The extraordinary larva is very distinctive, thickly covered with very long yellow and orange hairs with white spots outlined in black along the back. It feeds on various maples and also on common horse-chestnut, large-leaved lime, mulberry and pedunculate oak. The species overwinters as a pupa. Contrary to its bright colours, it is not poisonous, but may cause skin irritation if handled excessively.

== Subspecies ==
- A. a. aceris - Europe
- A. a. taurica - Cyprus
- A. a. judaea - Levant
