= Equine atypical myopathy =

Equine atypical myopathy, also known as atypical myoglobinuria, or EAM is a fatal disease of horses (equidae) characterized by acute rhabdomyolysis. It is caused by the ingestion of the seeds or young shoots of sycamore tree. EAM has a high fatality rate.

== Cause ==
Atypical myopathy is a commonly fatal form of equine rhabdomyolysis caused by the toxin Hypoglycin A (HGA). HGA is a naturally occurring amino acid contained by trees and shrubs of Acer genus. Horses can become poisoned by eating the seeds or seedlings of Acer pseudoplatanus (called Sycamore in the UK or more widely Sycamore Maple) or Acer negundo (Box Elder). The amount of HGA in sycamore seeds may vary. The toxin affects the functioning of horse's muscle cells by slowing down or stopping the energy production.

Even if atypical myopathy is not contagious it can affect either to individual horse or several horses in the same stock. Some horses may be more resistant to the toxin than others due to genetic differences and different grazing habitats.

Changes in weather conditions and temperature may contribute to the propensity of being affected, which is the reason why many cases are reported during autumn and spring.

== Diagnosis ==
Diagnosis can be confirmed by clinical examination and laboratory tests. In most cases treatment needs to be started before getting the laboratory test results as the confirmation of diagnosis may take several days.

First symptoms are usually muscular weakness, soreness and stiffness causing problems with walking and breathing. Within hours of first symptoms horse may be unable to stand and in 72 hours of the onset of signs mortalities may occur. The mortality rate of atypical myopathy is high; only 30-40% of affected horses survive.

EAM affected horse's urine is dark red or brown. Sweating and muscle trembling can be observed while moving. Horses may hang their heads down and be apathetic. Symptoms resemble colic symptoms except that EAM affected horse doesn't lose appetite. The body temperature, heart rate and respiratory rate may be normal in some cases.

== Prevention ==
As treatment is still unsuccessful in the majority of cases the main emphasis is on prevention. Risk of atypical myopathy can be reduced by checking pasture for sycamore plants regularly and avoid letting horses graze in pastures where are sycamore trees. In case there are fallen sycamore leaves and seeds in pasture they should be cleaned from the ground. Fresh and clean water should be easily accessible all the time. Keeping the stock size appropriate reduces the risk as there is enough proper grazing for every horse. Taking care of regular vaccinations and anthelmintic treatments decreases the risk. The presence of HGA in pasture can be tested by submitting a sample to laboratory.

== Treatment ==
EAM affected horses are in need of intensive care. There is no antitoxin for HGA but some medications can be used to stop absorption of the toxin. Symptomatic treatment includes intravenous fluid therapy, supplementation of glucose and insulin as well as administration of carnitine, vitamin E, selenium and riboflavin. Anti-inflammatory medication is used to decrease the pain and possibly increase the chance to survive. Supportive therapy includes the regular emptying of the bladder. Affected horse should be kept warm.

Horses usually recover completely if they survive the first days after being affected. Recovery may still take several months.
