= Agrilus politus =

Conservation status
- Secure (NatureServe)

Scientific classification
- Kingdom: Animalia
- Phylum: Arthropoda
- Clade: Pancrustacea
- Class: Insecta
- Order: Coleoptera
- Suborder: Polyphaga
- Infraorder: Elateriformia
- Family: Buprestidae
- Genus: Agrilus
- Species: A. politus

Binomial name
- Agrilus politus (Say, 1825)

Synonyms
- Agrilus canadensis Obenberger, 1917; Agrilus cupreolus LeConte, 1860; Agrilus desertus LeConte, 1860; Agrilus plumbeus LeConte, 1860; Agrilus solitarius Harold, 1869

Species of beetle

Agrilus politus, also known as the willow gall limb borer or common willow agrilus, is a species of metallic wood-boring beetle in the family Buprestidae. It is widely distributed in North America, from Alaska and northern Canada to Mexico.

Agrilus politus measure 4.7–8.5 mm (0.19–0.33 in).
