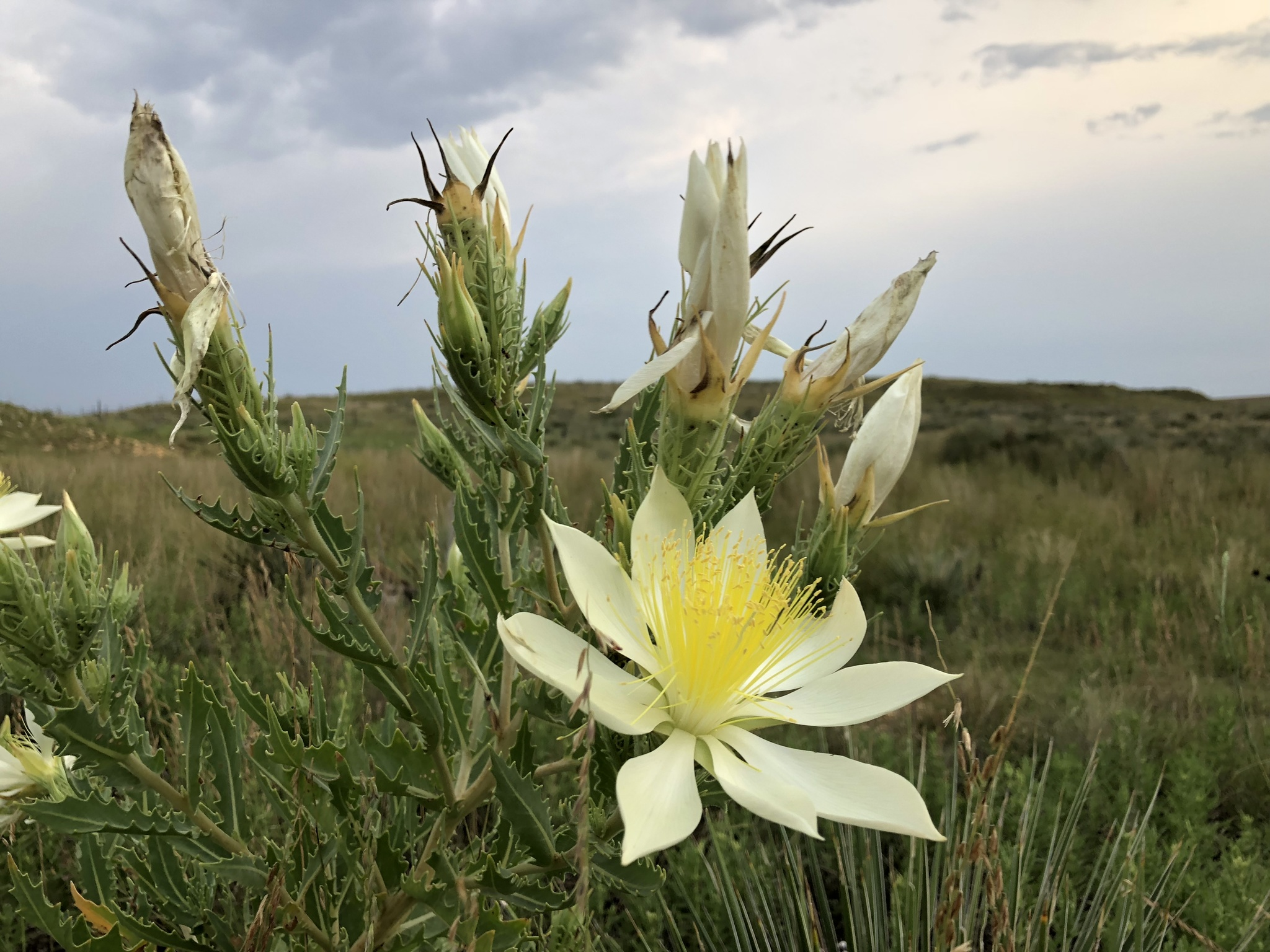

Conservation status
- Secure (NatureServe)

Scientific classification
- Kingdom: Plantae
- Clade: Tracheophytes
- Clade: Angiosperms
- Clade: Eudicots
- Clade: Asterids
- Order: Cornales
- Family: Loasaceae
- Genus: Mentzelia
- Species: M. decapetala

Binomial name
- Mentzelia decapetala (Sims) Urb.

Synonyms
- List: Bartonia decapetala; Bartonia ornata; Hesperaster decapetalus; Mentzelia ornata; Nuttallia decapetala; Torreya ornata; Touterea decapetala

= Mentzelia decapetala =

Plant species in the stickleaf family

Mentzelia decapetala, commonly known as tenpetal blazingstar, evening-star, or ten petaled western star is a biennial or short-lived perennial with large white flowers that bloom at night. It is native to dry areas of the western Great Plains in the United States and southern Canada. Its scientific name and many of its common names refer to the apparent ten petals of the flowers, the only species in the blazing star genus with such wide staminodes.

== Description ==
Tenpetal blazingstar is a bush-like perennial or biennial plant. Very rarely a plant may behave as an annual, blooming late in its first year and dying immediately afterwards, or spend a second year as an immature plant when weather or damage delays flowering. Its height is variable, but usually 15 to 91 centimeters (6 to 36 in) tall. It can sometimes be as tall as 100 cm (39 in). Plants may have a single stem or several and are upright or straight, however plants usually have just one stem. The stems are covered in a thin, white bark that peels off. They can branch only at the ends or along their entire length and are covered in hairs. It grows a deep taproot and is tolerant of drought conditions.

The leaves of the tenpetal blazingstar range in length between 7.2 and 29.5 centimeters (2.8 and 11.6 in) with a width of 1.4 to 4.5 cm (0.6 to 1.8 in). The edges of leaves have coarse, irregular serrations and the surface of leaves feel like sandpaper. The rough texture of the leaves is produced by stiff, barbed hairs which will cause them to stick quite tenaciously to clothing or fur. The hairs are similar in shape to a Japanese pagoda when examined microscopically.

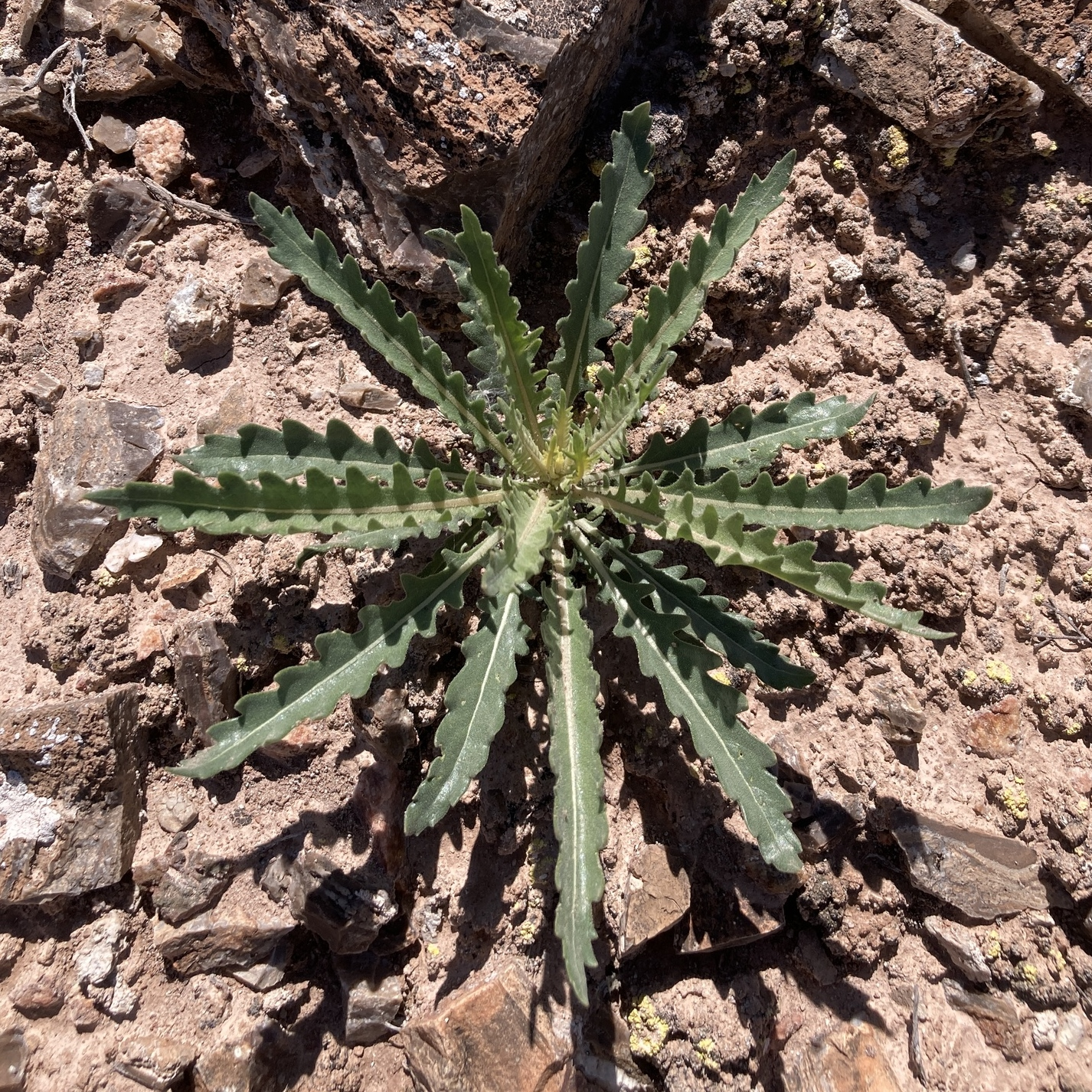
A rosette of leaves in Big Horn County, Wyoming

In its first year of growth tenpetal blazingstar has a basal rosette of leaves 10 to 20 centimeters (3.9 to 7.9 in) long and 1 to 3.5 cm (0.39 to 1.38 in) wide. They are oblong to oblanceolate, somewhat rectangular with rounded corners or having an outline like that of a reversed spear head with the point towards the stem and the broadest part past the midpoint. The edges are toothed, with the bottom of the indentations rounded and the lobes more pointed.

The shape of leaves lower down on the stems is oblanceolate or elliptic, having two gentle elliptic curves and the widest part at about midway between the tip and base. Each of these lower leaves will have 16 to 26 teeth or lobes that are antrorse, curve upwards slightly. Leaves towards the ends of the stems are elliptic to lanceolate in shape, the latter like a spear head with the widest part below the midpoint. The bases of upper leaves might clasp the stem.

=== Flowering ===
Single flowers are found at the end of the many branches. Each flower appears to have ten petals, but the inner five petals are in fact staminodia, a type of sterile stamen modified into a new structure. They are the largest of all the staminodia in the Mentzelia genus, averaging more than 2.5 mm in width. The showy flowers are white to palest-yellow in color. Each petal measures 4.7 to 7.5 cm in length by 1.3 to 2.27 cm broad with narrow points and are smooth and hairless on the outside. The center of the flower is filled with approximately 200 to 300 stamens, white to yellow in color and strongly clawed, curving inwards. The flowers open close to sunset, but they can be open early enough to be swarmed by foraging bees at the close of the day. The opening of the flower takes no more than one hour close to sunset, but will close up before the next day. Each flower lasts many evenings, opening each night and closing for the day, unless the morning is quite cloudy. The flowers release a noticeably pleasant scent.

They may bloom early as June or as late as August, or on occasion even into October, in its native range.

The fruit is an oblong cylindrical capsule 3–4.3 cm long and 1.2–1.7 cm wide with a tapering base, with the remnant of the dried style it has a resemblance to a stubby candle. When dry the capsule opens at the tip and shows there is only one chamber within the capsule containing a large number of seeds. The seeds are flattened lens shaped ovals 3–4 millimeters long. The edge has a papery wing 0.2–0.5 mm wide.

== Taxonomy ==
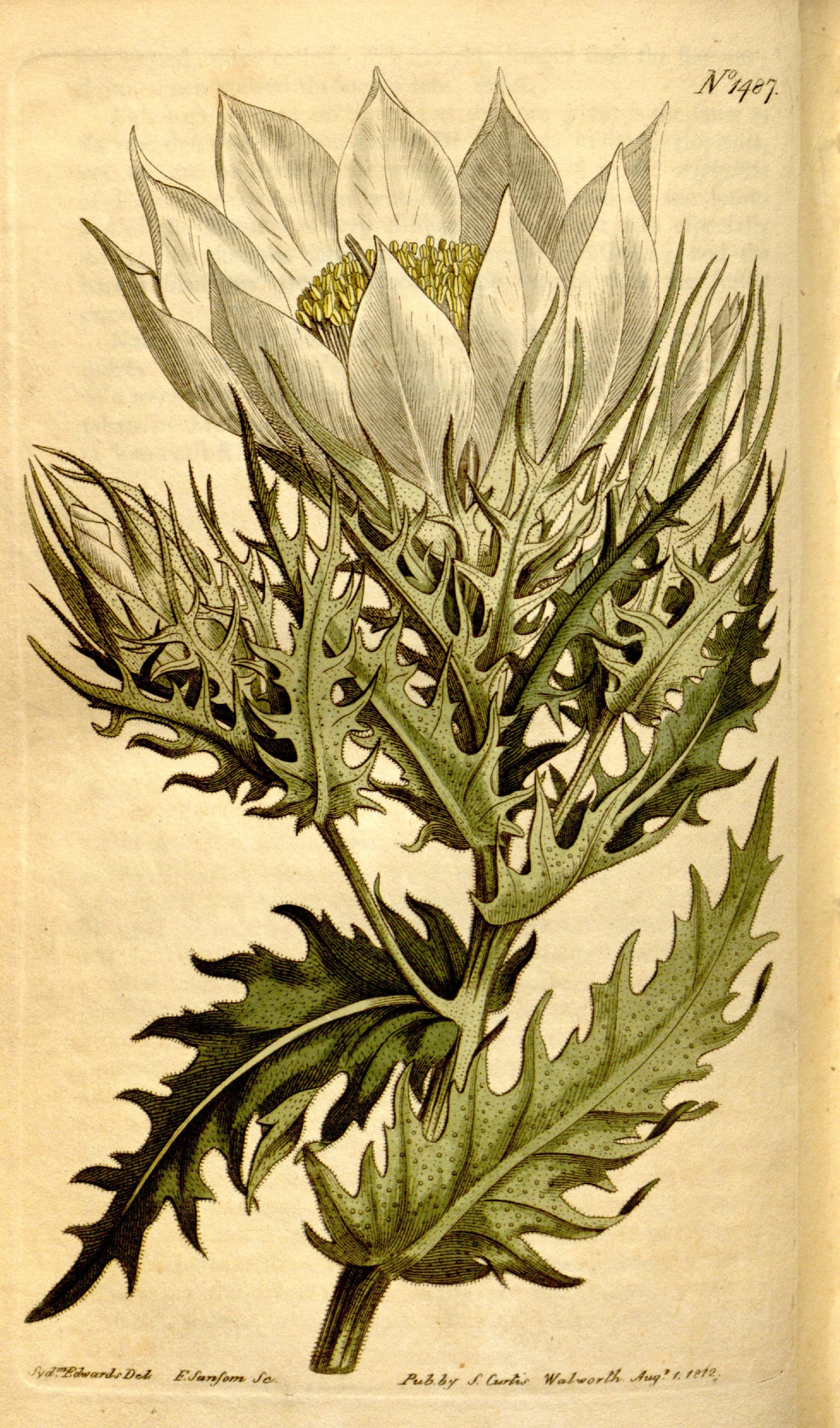
As illustrated in its scientific description in Curtis's Botanical Magazine in 1812

Mentzelia decapetala was scientifically described by John Sims in 1812 with the name Bartonia decapetala. In 1892 it was moved to the genus Mentzelia by Ignatz Urban. It has no accepted subspecies or varieties. The species of Mentzelia are part of the family Loasaceae. Studies of the genetics of this and other species have shown that Bartonia is a monophyletic group and it is recognized as a section of Mentzelia. Within the section M. decapetala is most closely related to a 'subshrubby' group with species such as Mentzelia rhizomata, Mentzelia multicaulis, and Mentzelia pterosperma. It is also an outlier among the species that it is most closely related to in having highly modified wide staminodes, unlike its closest relatives.

Where their range overlaps, M decapetala forms hybrids with Mentzelia laevicaulis. These hybrids have been found near Gardiner, Montana, but produce very little pollen and do not have viable seeds.

Specimens of the species were collected during the Lewis and Clark Expedition in August 1804 near the Omaha village of Tonwontonga. This is now in Dakota County, Nebraska near the town of Homer. Alternatively, it may have been collected from an area of white chalk bluffs near the mouth of the James River. This specimen is likely taken to London by Frederick Traugott Pursh and lost. However, seeds and specimens were taken to London in 1812 by Thomas Nuttall. He had collected them along the Missouri River in 1811 and some of the seeds were planted at the garden of the Fraser Brothers at Sloane Square.

=== Synonyms ===
Mentzelia decapetala has 7 synonyms.

Table of Synonyms
Name	Year	Notes
Bartonia decapetala Sims	1812	≡ hom.
Bartonia ornata Pursh	1813	= het.
Hesperaster decapetalus (Sims) Cockerell	1901	≡ hom.
Mentzelia ornata (Pursh) Torr. & A.Gray	1840	= het.
Nuttallia decapetala (Sims) Greene	1906	≡ hom.
Torreya ornata (Pursh) Eaton	1829	= het.
Touterea decapetala Rydb.	1903	= het.
Notes: ≡ homotypic synonym; = heterotypic synonym

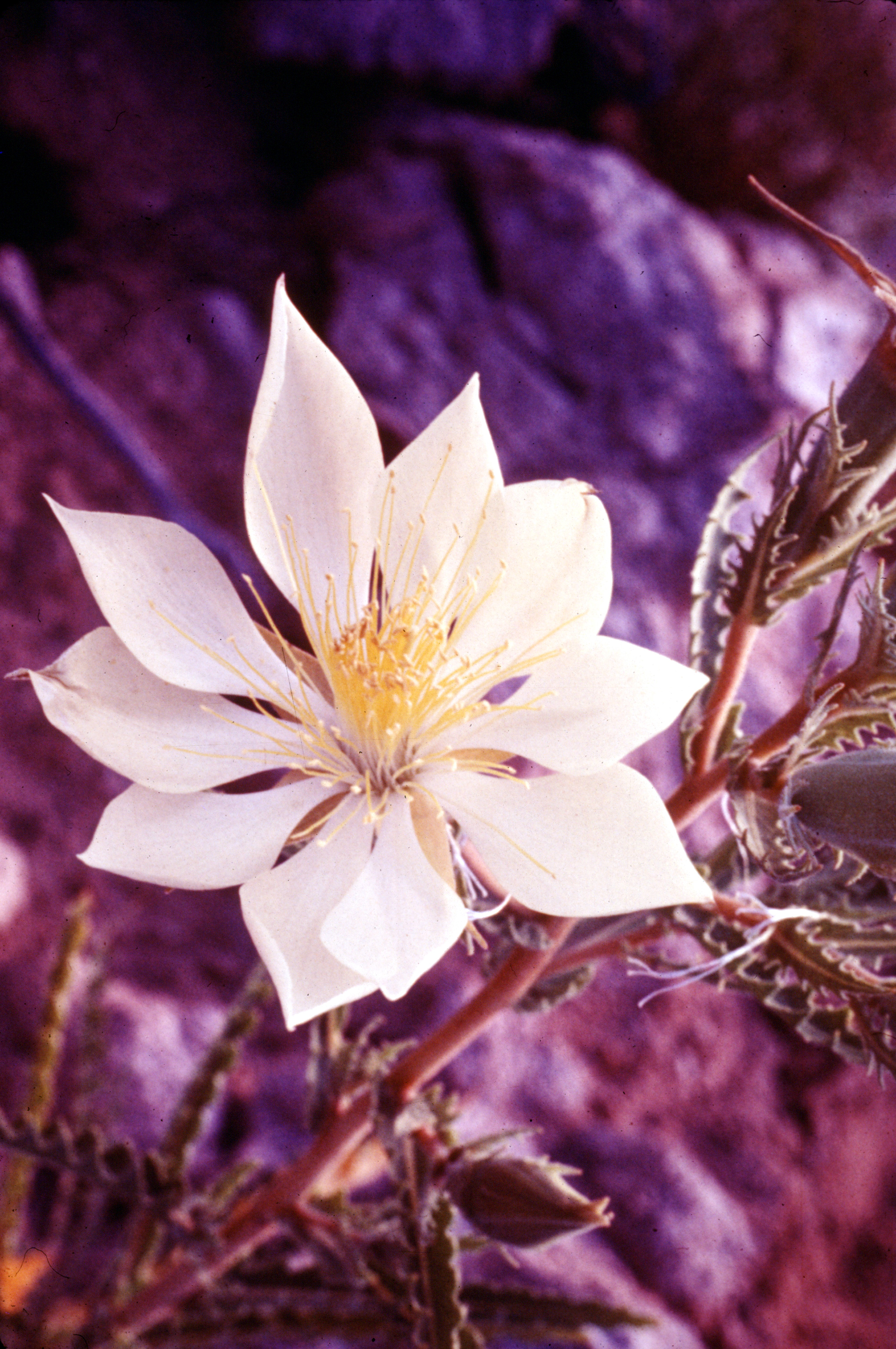
National Park Service photo from Wind Cave National Park, South Dakota

=== Names ===
The genus is the namesake of the German botanist and physician Christian Mentzel who lived from 1622 to 1701. The species name, decapetala, means "ten petals" in botanical Greek. deka, ten, plus petalon, a leaf or petal.

In English it is known by many common names. Very often it is called tenpetal blazingstar or ten-petaled blazing star, the name blazing star being applied to many species of the genus for the combination of five pointed petals with the many bristling stamens.

It is also called ten petaled western star or 10-petalled western star. The names large evening star, giant eveningstar, evening starflower eveningstar, or evening star are in reference to the fact that the flowers open in the evening. The name candleflower is suggested by Florence McKinney to be due to the appearance of the closed flowers during the daytime, however this name is also used for mullein (Verbascum thapsus).

Though it is not related to the lilies it is also called the prairie lily, gumbo-lily, sand-lily, midnight lily, and chalk lily. As with other members of the family, it is also known as ten-petal stick-leaf, tenpetal stickleaf, or prairie stickleaf, stickleaf being a name applied to them because of the way that their leaves stick to clothing. As with many other night blooming flowers it has been known locally as moonflower. Additionally it is known as tenpetal mentzelia.

In the Lakota language this species is known as čhaŋȟlóǧaŋ maȟˀáwanglakela, meaning cicada weed, weed being any pithy plant.

== Range and habitat ==
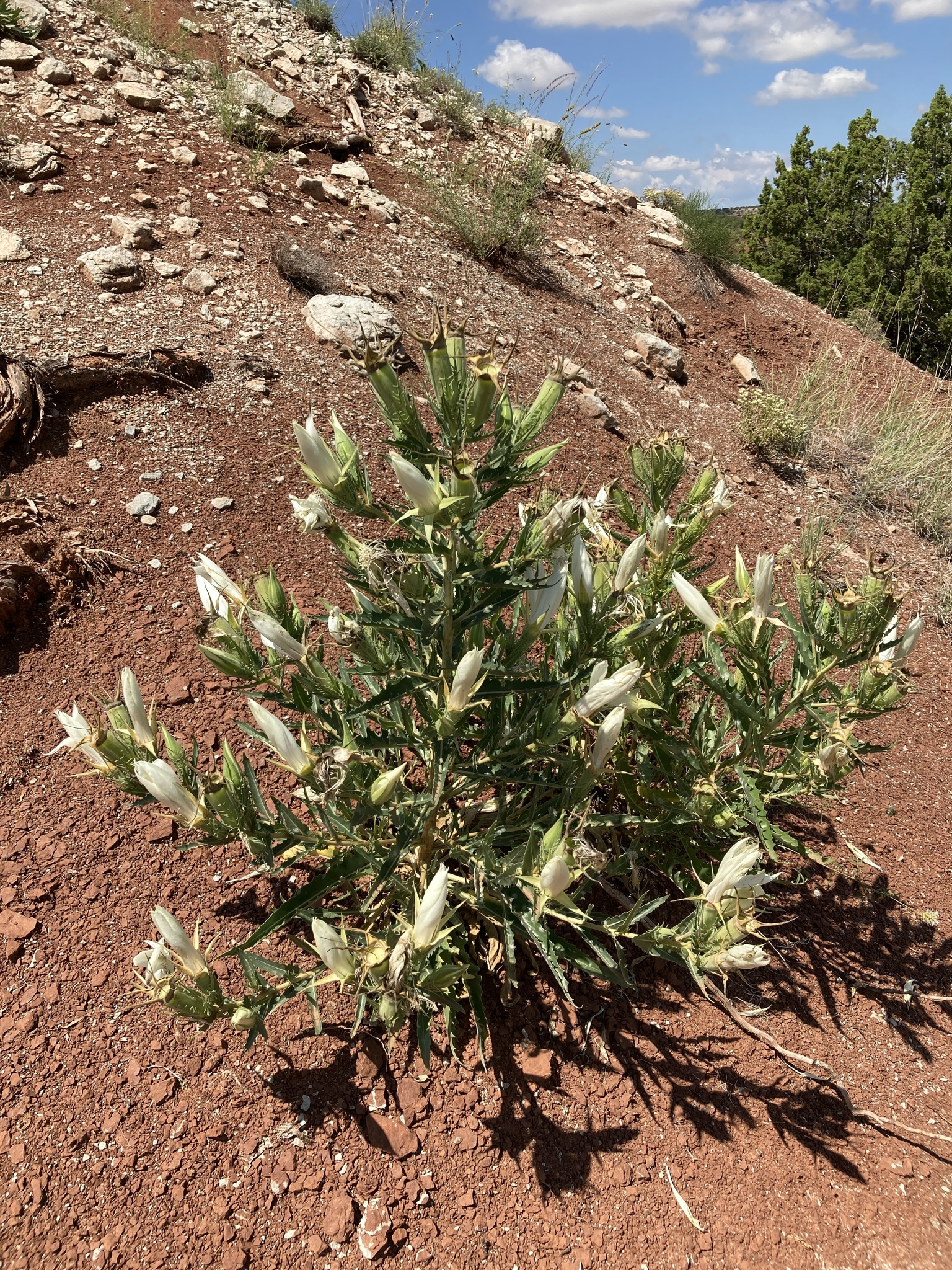
Plant during the day with flowers closed on typical sparsely vegetated soil, Guadalupe County, New Mexico

Tenpetal blazingstar is native to a large part of the Great Plains from northern Texas to southern Canada from Alberta eastwards to Manitoba. In Alberta it grows in the southern quarter of the province. The USDA Natural Resources Conservation Service PLANTS database has records of the species across the northern plains in most of Montana, parts of western North Dakota, and scattered through South Dakota. It is also reported by them in Butte County, Idaho, but Plants of the World Online and the Flora of North America (FNA) do not report it as native to Idaho. Likewise they also do not report it as present in either Nevada or North Dakota. Further south on the plains the species grows in much of Wyoming, scattered through Nebraska, the western edge of Iowa, western Kansas, and eastern Colorado. It also can be found in the northeast corner of New Mexico, the Texas panhandle, and in western Oklahoma. In Utah, it is only found in Cache County in the northern part of the state. The population in Grundy County, Illinois is generally agreed to be an introduced species.

This species prefers disturbed ground, such as along roadsides. It can grow on rocky, sandy, or somewhat clay soils. They also may be found on dry hillsides with high lime content in the tallgrass prairie. It does not compete well with other plant species and for this reason is generally found in areas with less vegetation such as on shale outcrops. Likewise, it has a tolerance for higher salt levels in the soil.

=== Conservation ===
Tenpetal blazingstar was evaluated by the conservation organization NatureServe in 1988 and rated as secure (G5) at the global level. At the state or provincial level they rated it as apparently secure (S4) in Kansas. In Wyoming, Montana, Alberta, and Saskatchewan it is vulnerable (S3). While in New Mexico it is imperiled (S2) and critically imperiled (S1) in Iowa. They think it may be locally extinct in Manitoba. The rest of its range has not been evaluated at the state level. It is of moderate importance for the conservation of prairie ecosystems that may be introduced to appropriate habitats further north for assisting its migration in response to climate change.

== Ecology ==
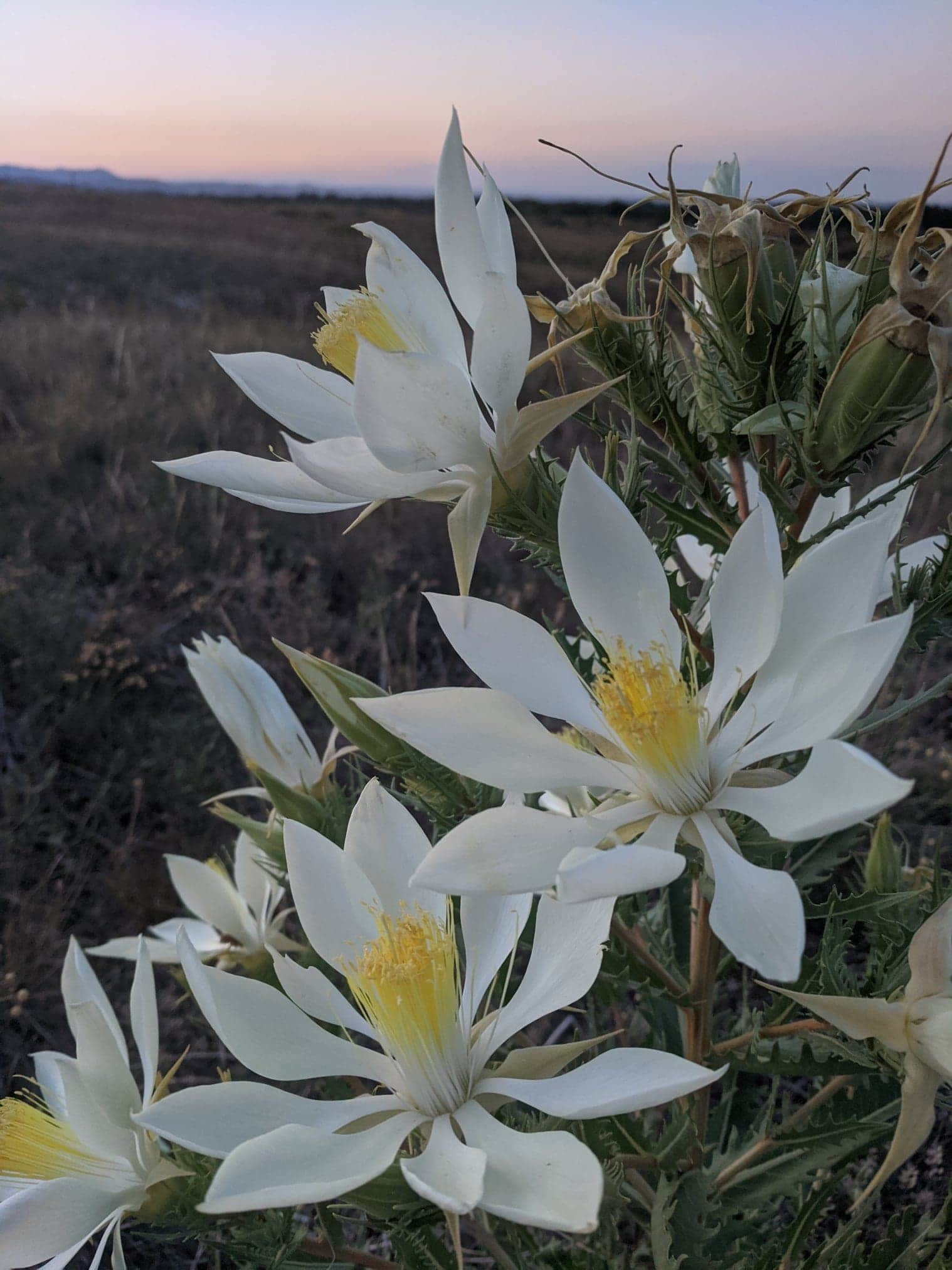
Near sunset Pineridge Natural Area, Fort Collins, Colorado

The iridoid glycoside, mentzeloside, was first identified from tenpetaled blazingstar in 1968. It is a white crystalline chemical when purified and is found in the flowers and seed pods. While working to more precisely characterize mentzeloside a second iridoid, decaloside, was isolated from it in 1973. The plants accumulate selenium from soils that contain the element, making them mildly poisonous.

The moth Anoncia leucoritis feeds on the seed pods of tenpetal blazingstar as larvae and in turn is parasitized by the wasp Bracon mellitor.

The bee Perdita wootonae is an oligolectic species, one that narrowly specializes in collecting pollen from very few sources. It visits the flowers in the late afternoon as soon as they open. However, when they climb out on the long stamens to collect the pollen they do not transfer any to the stigma of the flower producing no benefit to the species. Though P. wootonae is not a pollinator, the species is primarily cross pollinated by other bee species with some visitation and pollination by night flying sphinx moths. In South Dakota the moth Sphinx vashti have been observed visiting the flowers.

In the absence of pollinators tenpetal blazingstar will set seed through self-pollination. Study of the species in a greenhouse found that it will have full seed capsules even when isolated from insect pollinators. Loose pollen released when the flower opens is deposited on the reproductive parts when the bloom closes up for the day. The closing of the flowers during the day is an adaptation to avoid water loss in dry environments.

The seeds are primarily wind distributed. The seed capsules are held upright and the seeds are flung out only on windy days by the action of the stiff, dry stems swinging back and forth.

== Cultivation ==
Tenpetal blazingstar is grown as a garden plant for their large, showy, and fragrant flowers, especially in moon gardens or along roadways. They require full sun in a well drained soil. A long period of being waterlogged will cause plants to die at any stage of growth. Due to the very long and fiberous taproot plants are difficult to transplant and are more often seeded in the desired location in a garden. The root will grow to a depth of 15 cm (6 in) before the top of the plant is 2.5 cm (1 in) tall. Seeds require a one month cool, moist stratification for good germination. It is winter hardy in USDA Zone 4–9.
