= Anoncia leucoritis =

Scientific classification
- Kingdom: Animalia
- Phylum: Arthropoda
- Class: Insecta
- Order: Lepidoptera
- Family: Cosmopterigidae
- Genus: Anoncia
- Species: A. leucoritis

Binomial name
- Anoncia leucoritis (Meyrick, 1927)

Synonyms
- Borkhausenia leucoritis Meyrick, 1927; Anoncia mentzeliae Clarke, 1942

Species of moth

Anoncia leucoritis is a moth in the family Cosmopterigidae. It was described by Edward Meyrick in 1927. It is found in North America, where it has been recorded from south-eastern Washington south to California and from there east to Arizona and Texas.

Adults have been recorded on wing in April and August.

The larvae feed on Mentzelia laevicaulis. They also feed on the seedpods of tenpetal blazingstar (Mentzelia decapetala).

They are parasitized while larvae by the wasp Bracon mellitor.
