= Campyloneurus =

Scientific classification
- Kingdom: Animalia
- Phylum: Arthropoda
- Class: Insecta
- Order: Hymenoptera
- Family: Braconidae
- Subfamily: Braconinae
- Tribe: Aphrastobraconini
- Genus: Campyloneurus; Szépligeti, 1900

Species
- Several, including: Campyloneurus elegans

Synonyms
- Diolcia (Enderlein, 1920); Monolcia (Enderlein, 1920)

Genus of wasps

Campyloneurus is a genus of wasps in the subfamily Braconinae. Species are found in Southern Africa, Australia and Far East Asia.
