= Cyanopterus =

Cyanopterus Temporal range: Eocene–Recent

Scientific classification
- Kingdom: Animalia
- Phylum: Arthropoda
- Class: Insecta
- Order: Hymenoptera
- Family: Braconidae
- Subfamily: Braconinae
- Tribe: Braconini
- Genus: Cyanopterus; Haliday, 1835

Species
- Many, including: †Cyanopterus vectensis Cockerell 1921

Genus of wasps

Cyanopterus is a genus of wasps in the family Braconidae. It is an extant genus but there is at least one fossil species from the Eocene of the United Kingdom.
