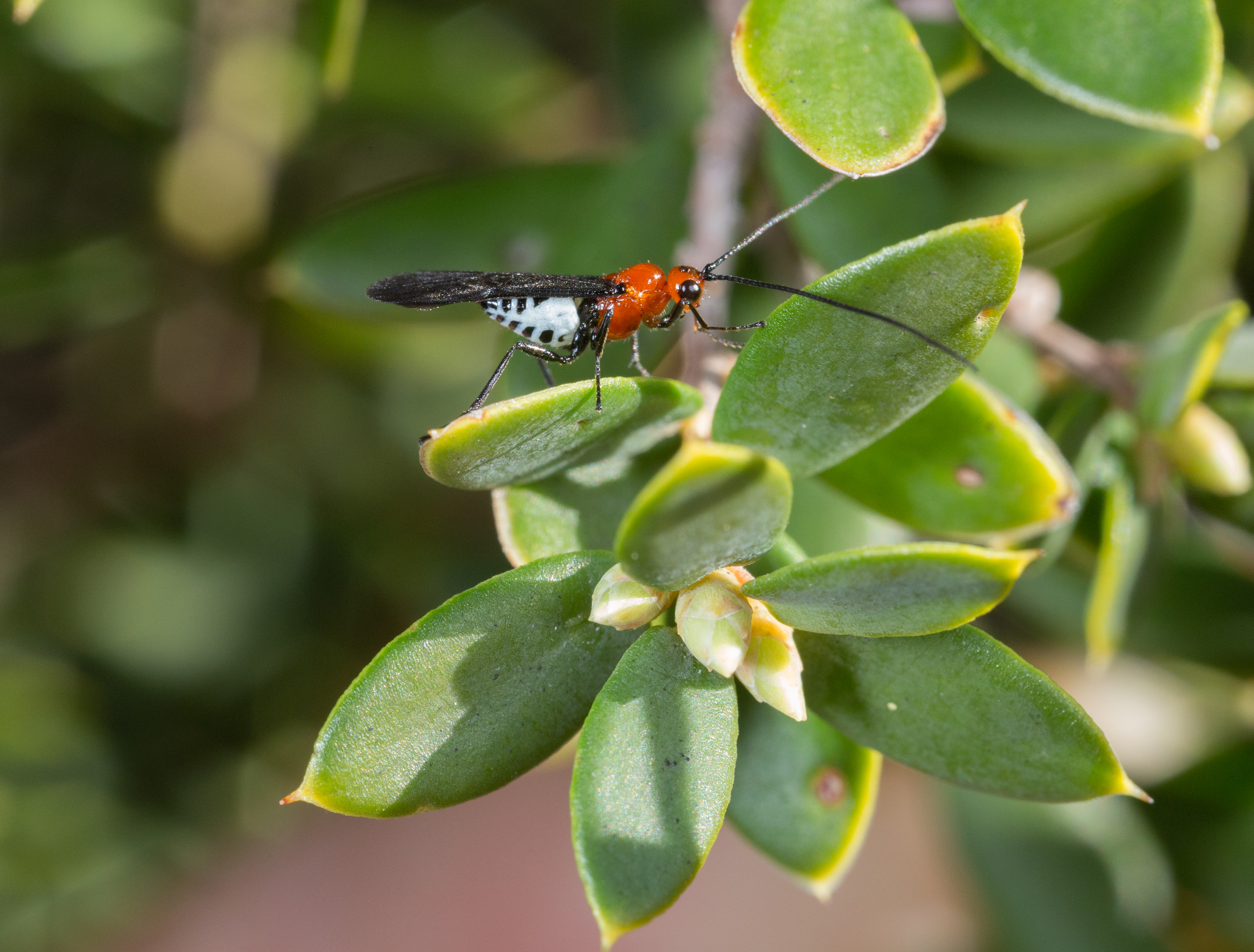
- Callibracon sp.

Scientific classification
- Kingdom: Animalia
- Phylum: Arthropoda
- Class: Insecta
- Order: Hymenoptera
- Family: Braconidae
- Subfamily: Braconinae
- Tribe: Aphrastobraconini
- Genus: Callibracon; Ashmead, 1900

Species
- 8 species (see text)

= Callibracon =

Genus of wasps

Callibracon is a genus of wasps in the family Braconidae. Certain members of this genus are known to be parasitoids of eucalyptus longhorn beetles, Phoracantha spp.

== Species ==
Callibracon contains eight species:

- Callibracon capitator (Fabricius, 1775)
- Callibracon elegans (Szepligeti, 1901)
- Callibracon flaviceps (Cameron, 1901)
- Callibracon kurentzovi (Belokobylskij, 1986)
- Callibracon limbatus (Brulle, 1846)
- Callibracon moorei Quicke & Austin, 1994
- Callibracon novocaledonicus (Szepligeti, 1906)
- Callibracon ruficeps (Szepligeti, 1905)
