= Campyloneurus elegans =

Scientific classification
- Kingdom: Animalia
- Phylum: Arthropoda
- Class: Insecta
- Order: Hymenoptera
- Family: Braconidae
- Genus: Campyloneurus
- Species: C. elegans

Binomial name
- Campyloneurus elegans Szépligeti, 1914

Species of wasp

Campyloneurus elegans is a species of wasp in the subfamily Braconinae. It is found in Cameroon.
