= Bracon osculator =

Scientific classification
- Kingdom: Animalia
- Phylum: Arthropoda
- Clade: Pancrustacea
- Class: Insecta
- Order: Hymenoptera
- Family: Braconidae
- Genus: Bracon
- Species: B. osculator

Binomial name
- Bracon osculator Nees, 1811

Synonyms
- Bracon degenerator Marshall, 1885; Bracon bisignatus (Wesmael, 1838)

Species of insect

Bracon osculator is a species of braconid wasp in the family Braconidae.

== History ==
It was described in 1918 by Nees.
