= Bracon tshutshur =

Scientific classification
- Kingdom: Animalia
- Phylum: Arthropoda
- Clade: Pancrustacea
- Class: Insecta
- Order: Hymenoptera
- Family: Braconidae
- Genus: Bracon
- Species: B. tshutshur

Binomial name
- Bracon tshutshur (Tobias, 2000)

Species of insect

Bracon tshutshur is a species of parasitoid wasp in the genus Bracon, of the family Braconidae.

It was first scientifically described in 2000 by Martha L. Tobias.
