= Bracon trypaeniphaga =

Scientific classification
- Kingdom: Animalia
- Phylum: Arthropoda
- Clade: Pancrustacea
- Class: Insecta
- Order: Hymenoptera
- Family: Braconidae
- Genus: Bracon
- Species: B. trypaeniphaga

Binomial name
- Bracon trypaeniphaga (Ramakrishna Ayyar, 1928)

Species of wasp

Bracon trypaeniphaga is a species of braconid wasp in the family Braconidae. It was described in 1928 by Ramakrishna Ayyar.
