= Bracon inculeatus =

Scientific classification
- Kingdom: Animalia
- Phylum: Arthropoda
- Clade: Pancrustacea
- Class: Insecta
- Order: Hymenoptera
- Family: Braconidae
- Genus: Bracon
- Species: B. inculeatus

Binomial name
- Bracon inculeatus Cameron, 1911

Species of wasp

Bracon inculeatus is a species of braconid wasp in the family Braconidae. It was first scientifically described in 1911 by Cameron.
