= Bracon femoralis =

Scientific classification
- Kingdom: Animalia
- Phylum: Arthropoda
- Class: Insecta
- Order: Hymenoptera
- Family: Braconidae
- Genus: Bracon
- Species: B. femoralis

Binomial name
- Bracon femoralis (Brulle, 1832)

Species of wasp

Bracon femoralis is a species of wasp that belongs to the family Braconidae. The scientific name of the species was first published and made valid by Brulle in 1832.
