= Anoncia crossi =

Scientific classification
- Kingdom: Animalia
- Phylum: Arthropoda
- Clade: Pancrustacea
- Class: Insecta
- Order: Lepidoptera
- Family: Cosmopterigidae
- Genus: Anoncia
- Species: A. crossi

Binomial name
- Anoncia crossi Adamski, 1989

Species of moth

Anoncia crossi is a moth in the family Cosmopterigidae. It was described by David Adamski in 1989. It is found in Mexico (Guerrero).

The length of the forewings is 6.7-8.4 mm.
