= Anoncia longa =

Scientific classification
- Kingdom: Animalia
- Phylum: Arthropoda
- Class: Insecta
- Order: Lepidoptera
- Family: Cosmopterigidae
- Genus: Anoncia
- Species: A. longa

Binomial name
- Anoncia longa (Meyrick, 1927)

Synonyms
- Borkhausenia longa Meyrick, 1927

Species of moth

Anoncia longa is a moth in the family Cosmopterigidae. It was described by Edward Meyrick in 1927. It is found in North America, where it has been recorded from Texas, New Mexico, Colorado, Utah and Arizona.
