= Bracon caudiger =

Scientific classification
- Kingdom: Animalia
- Phylum: Arthropoda
- Clade: Pancrustacea
- Class: Insecta
- Order: Hymenoptera
- Family: Braconidae
- Genus: Bracon
- Species: B. caudiger

Binomial name
- Bracon caudiger (Nees, 1834)

Species of insect

Bracon caudiger is a species of braconid wasp in the family Braconidae.
