= Anoncia texanella =

Scientific classification
- Kingdom: Animalia
- Phylum: Arthropoda
- Clade: Pancrustacea
- Class: Insecta
- Order: Lepidoptera
- Family: Cosmopterigidae
- Genus: Anoncia
- Species: A. texanella

Binomial name
- Anoncia texanella (Chambers, 1878)

Synonyms
- Elachista texanella Chambers, 1878

Species of moth

Anoncia texanella is a moth in the family Cosmopterigidae. It was described by Vactor Tousey Chambers in 1878. It is found in North America, where it has been recorded from Texas.
