= Anoncia naclia =

Scientific classification
- Kingdom: Animalia
- Phylum: Arthropoda
- Clade: Pancrustacea
- Class: Insecta
- Order: Lepidoptera
- Family: Cosmopterigidae
- Genus: Anoncia
- Species: A. naclia

Binomial name
- Anoncia naclia Hodges, 1978

Species of moth

Anoncia naclia is a moth in the family Cosmopterigidae. It was described by Ronald W. Hodges in 1978. It is found in North America, where it has been recorded from Arizona.
