= Bracon confusus =

Scientific classification
- Kingdom: Animalia
- Phylum: Arthropoda
- Clade: Pancrustacea
- Class: Insecta
- Order: Hymenoptera
- Family: Braconidae
- Genus: Bracon
- Species: B. confusus

Binomial name
- Bracon confusus Austin, 1989

Species of insect

Bracon confusus is a species of braconid wasp in the family Braconidae. It was first scientifically described in 1989 by Austin.
