= Callibracon elegans =

Scientific classification
- Kingdom: Animalia
- Phylum: Arthropoda
- Class: Insecta
- Order: Hymenoptera
- Family: Braconidae
- Genus: Callibracon
- Species: C. elegans

Binomial name
- Callibracon elegans (Szépligeti, 1901)

Species of wasp

Callibracon elegans is a species of wasp in the family Braconidae.
