= Bracon sanninoideae =

Scientific classification
- Kingdom: Animalia
- Phylum: Arthropoda
- Clade: Pancrustacea
- Class: Insecta
- Order: Hymenoptera
- Family: Braconidae
- Genus: Bracon
- Species: B. sanninoideae

Binomial name
- Bracon sanninoideae (Gahan, 1917)

Species of wasp

Bracon sanninoideae is a species of braconid wasp in the family Braconidae. It was first scientifically described in 1917 by Charles Joseph Gahan.
