= Aphrastobraconini =

Scientific classification
- Kingdom: Animalia
- Phylum: Arthropoda
- Class: Insecta
- Order: Hymenoptera
- Family: Braconidae
- Subfamily: Braconinae
- Tribe: Aphrastobraconini; Ashmead, 1900

Genera
- Several, including: Aphrastobracon; Callibracon; Campyloneurus

Synonyms
- Atanycolini (Fahringer, 1928); Iphiaulacini (Fahringer, 1928); Victoroviellini (Tobias, 1986)

Tribe of wasps

Aphrastobraconini is a tribe of wasps in the subfamily Braconinae.
