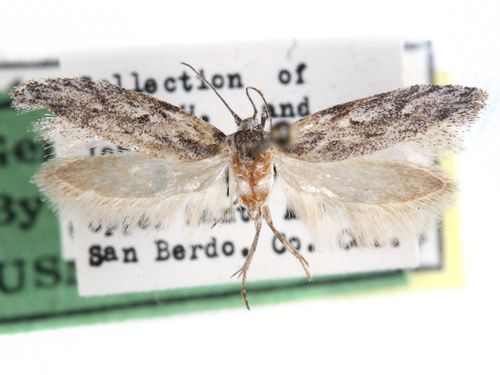

Scientific classification
- Kingdom: Animalia
- Phylum: Arthropoda
- Class: Insecta
- Order: Lepidoptera
- Family: Cosmopterigidae
- Genus: Anoncia
- Species: A. conia

Binomial name
- Anoncia conia (Walsingham, 1907)

Synonyms
- Hypatopa conia Walsingham, 1907; Borkhausenia marinensis Keifer, 1935

= Anoncia conia =

Species of moth

Anoncia conia is a moth in the family Cosmopterigidae. It is found in California, United States.

The wingspan is 14–16 mm. The forewings are whitish cinereous (ash-gray), dusted with brownish fuscous. The hindwings are cinereous, with a slight brownish tinge.
