= Anoncia diveni =

Scientific classification
- Kingdom: Animalia
- Phylum: Arthropoda
- Clade: Pancrustacea
- Class: Insecta
- Order: Lepidoptera
- Family: Cosmopterigidae
- Genus: Anoncia
- Species: A. diveni

Binomial name
- Anoncia diveni (Heinrich, 1921)

Synonyms
- Borkhausenia diveni Heinrich, 1921

Species of moth

Anoncia diveni is a moth in the family Cosmopterigidae. It was described by Carl Heinrich in 1921. It is found in Honduras, Mexico, and North America, where it has been recorded from Texas.

The larvae feed on Lantana species.
