= Anoncia callida =

Scientific classification
- Kingdom: Animalia
- Phylum: Arthropoda
- Clade: Pancrustacea
- Class: Insecta
- Order: Lepidoptera
- Family: Cosmopterigidae
- Genus: Anoncia
- Species: A. callida

Binomial name
- Anoncia callida Hodges, 1962

Species of moth

Anoncia callida is a moth in the family Cosmopterigidae. It was described by Ronald W. Hodges in 1962. It is found in North America, where it has been recorded from Arizona and Texas.

The wingspan is about 17 mm. Adults have been recorded on wing in June and October.
