= Anoncia chordostoma =

Scientific classification
- Kingdom: Animalia
- Phylum: Arthropoda
- Class: Insecta
- Order: Lepidoptera
- Family: Cosmopterigidae
- Genus: Anoncia
- Species: A. chordostoma

Binomial name
- Anoncia chordostoma (Meyrick, 1912)

Synonyms
- Cryptolechia chordostoma Meyrick, 1912

Species of moth

Anoncia chordostoma is a moth in the family Cosmopterigidae. It was described by Edward Meyrick in 1912. It is found in Argentina.
