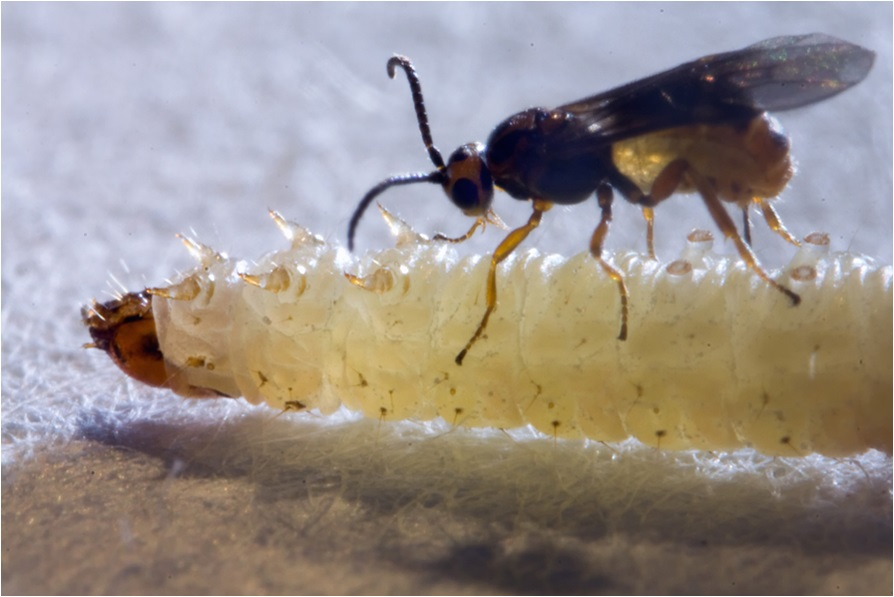
- Bracon brevicornis, female inserting ovipositor into paralyzed host.

Scientific classification
- Kingdom: Animalia
- Phylum: Arthropoda
- Clade: Pancrustacea
- Class: Insecta
- Order: Hymenoptera
- Family: Braconidae
- Subfamily: Braconinae
- Tribe: Braconini; Nees, 1811

Genera
- Many, including: Bracon; Cyanopterus; Habrobracon

Synonyms
- Aspidobraconina (Van Achterberg, 1984); Chiviniini (Shestakov, 1932); Glyptomorphini (Tobias, 1957); Habrobraconini (Fahringer, 1928); Isomecini (Tobias, 1990); Microbraconini (Bridwell, 1920); Vipionini (Gahan, 1917)

= Braconini =

Tribe of wasps

Braconini is a tribe of wasps in the subfamily Braconinae.

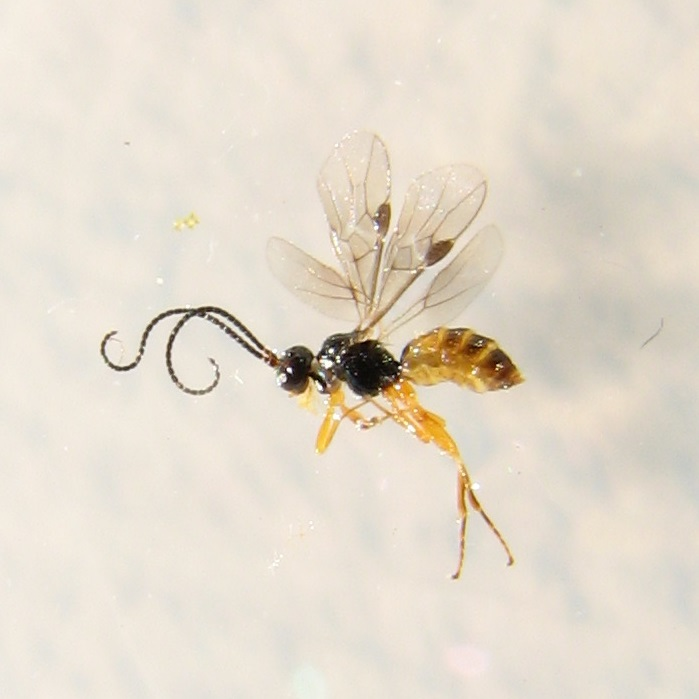
Bracon sp.
