= Anoncia =

Scientific classification
- Domain: Eukaryota
- Kingdom: Animalia
- Phylum: Arthropoda
- Class: Insecta
- Order: Lepidoptera
- Family: Cosmopterigidae
- Subfamily: Cosmopteriginae
- Genus: Anoncia; Clarke, 1941

Genus of moths

Anoncia is a genus of moths in the family Cosmopterigidae.

== Species ==
- Anoncia aciculata (Meyrick, 1928)
- Anoncia alboligula Hodges, 1962
- Anoncia bitoqua Hodges, 1978
- Anoncia brunneipes Hodges, 1962
- Anoncia callida Hodges, 1962
- Anoncia chordostoma (Meyrick, 1912)
- Anoncia conia (Walsingham, 1907) (syn: Borkhausenia marinensis Keifer, 1935)
- Anoncia crossi Adamski, 1989
- Anoncia diveni (Heinrich, 1921)
- Anoncia episcia (Walsingham, 1907)
- Anoncia fasciata (Walsingham, 1907)
- Anoncia flegax Hodges, 1978
- Anoncia fregeis Hodges, 1978
- Anoncia furvicosta Hodges, 1962
- Anoncia glacialis Hodges, 1962
- Anoncia leucoritis (Meyrick, 1927) (syn: Anoncia mentzeliae Clarke, 1942)
- Anoncia loexya Hodges, 1978
- Anoncia longa (Meyrick, 1927)
- Anoncia mones Hodges, 1978
- Anoncia mosa Hodges, 1978
- Anoncia naclia Hodges, 1978
- Anoncia nebritis Hodges, 1962
- Anoncia nocticola Hodges, 1962
- Anoncia noscres Hodges, 1978
- Anoncia orites (Walsingham, 1907)
- Anoncia piperata Hodges, 1962
- Anoncia porriginosa Hodges, 1962
- Anoncia psentia Hodges, 1978
- Anoncia psepsa Hoges, 1978
- Anoncia slales Hodges, 1978
- Anoncia smogops Hodges, 1978
- Anoncia sphacelina (Keifer, 1935)
- Anoncia texanella (Chambers, 1878)
- Anoncia venis Hodges, 1978
