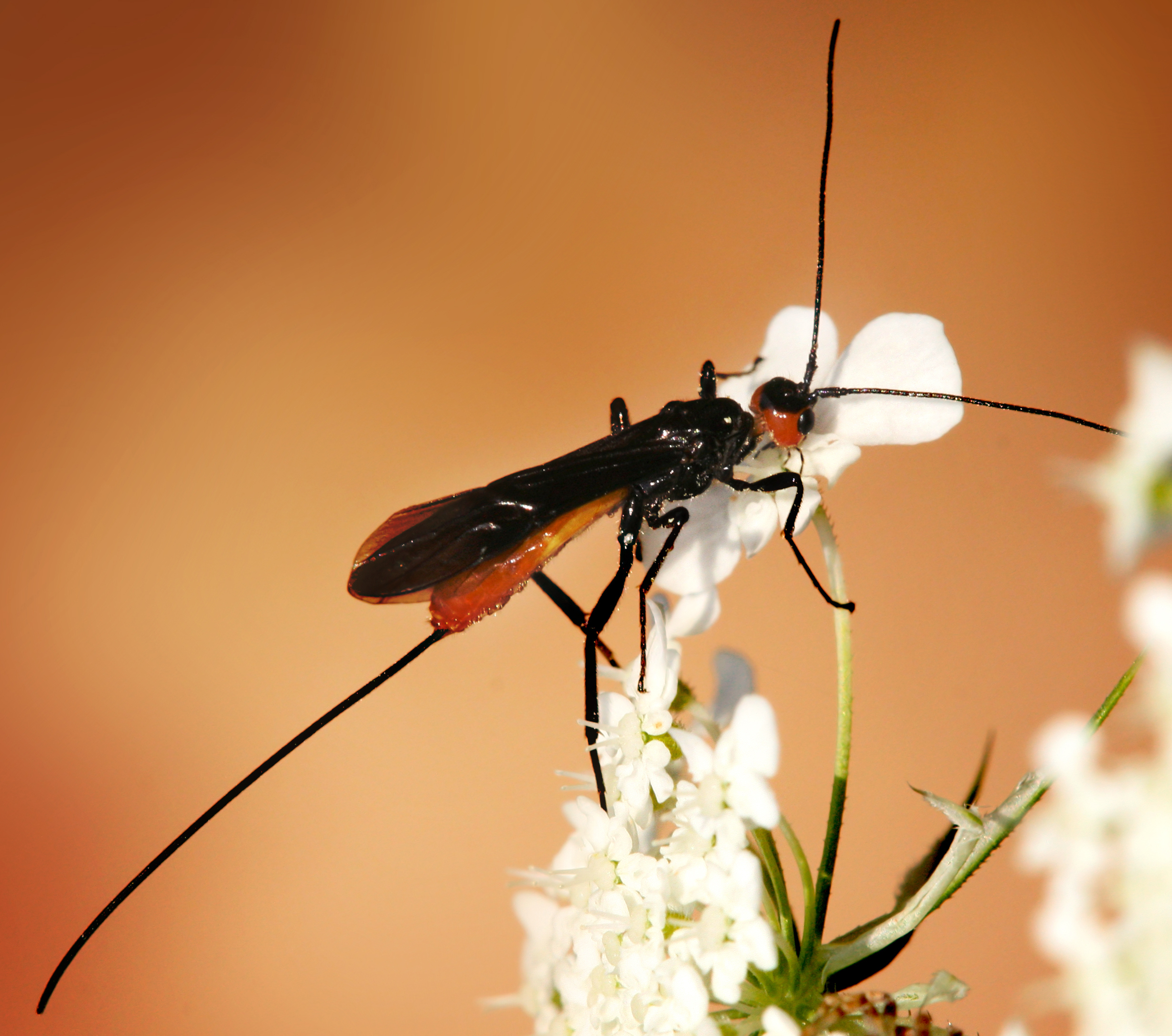
- Atanycolus sp.

Scientific classification
- Domain: Eukaryota
- Kingdom: Animalia
- Phylum: Arthropoda
- Class: Insecta
- Order: Hymenoptera
- Family: Braconidae
- Subfamily: Braconinae
- Genus: Atanycolus; Förster, 1862

= Atanycolus =

Genus of wasps

Atanycolus is a genus of braconid wasps. Species in this genus are parasitoids of beetles from families Buprestidae and Curculionidae.

== Species ==
- Atanycolus anocomidis
- Atanycolus arcasuturalis
- Atanycolus australiensis
- Atanycolus bambalio
- Atanycolus bignelli
- Atanycolus calophrys
- Atanycolus cappaerti
- Atanycolus charus
- Atanycolus clypealis
- Atanycolus comosifrons
- Atanycolus crassicruris
- Atanycolus crenulatus
- Atanycolus cryptaspis
- Atanycolus denigrator
- Atanycolus dichrous
- Atanycolus disputabilis
- Atanycolus fahringeri
- Atanycolus femoratae
- Atanycolus fulviceps
- Atanycolus fulvus
- Atanycolus fuscipennis
- Atanycolus fuscorbitalis
- Atanycolus genalis
- Atanycolus hicoriae
- Atanycolus hookeri
- Atanycolus impressifrons
- Atanycolus impressus
- Atanycolus initiator
- Atanycolus ivanowi
- Atanycolus latabdominalis
- Atanycolus lindemani
- Atanycolus lineola
- Atanycolus lissogastrus
- Atanycolus longicauda
- Atanycolus longifemoralis
- Atanycolus malii
- Atanycolus megophthalmus
- Atanycolus melanophili
- Atanycolus microcellus
- Atanycolus microstigmatus
- Atanycolus montivagus
- Atanycolus neesii
- Atanycolus nigriventris
- Atanycolus nigropyga
- Atanycolus niteofrons
- Atanycolus obliquus
- Atanycolus octocolae
- Atanycolus parvacavus
- Atanycolus peruvianus
- Atanycolus petiolaris
- Atanycolus phaeostethus
- Atanycolus picipes
- Atanycolus pilosiventris
- Atanycolus rugosiventris
- Atanycolus simplex
- Atanycolus tangmargensis
- Atanycolus tranquebaricae
- Atanycolus triangulifer
- Atanycolus trichiura
- Atanycolus tunetensis
- Atanycolus ulmicola
