= Bracon unipunctatus =

Scientific classification
- Kingdom: Animalia
- Phylum: Arthropoda
- Class: Insecta
- Order: Hymenoptera
- Family: Braconidae
- Genus: Bracon
- Species: B. unipunctatus

Binomial name
- Bracon unipunctatus Brullé, 1846

Species of wasp

Bracon unipunctatus is a species of parasitoid wasp in the genus Bracon, of the family Braconidae.

It was first scientifically described in 1846 by Gaspard Auguste Brullé.
