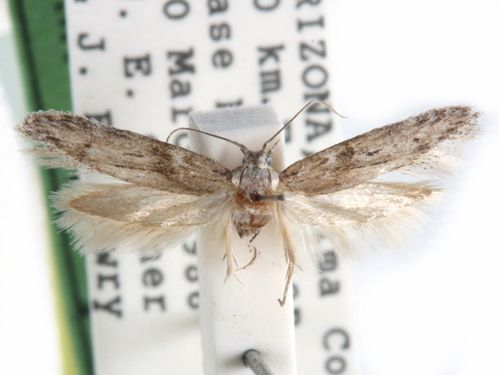

Scientific classification
- Kingdom: Animalia
- Phylum: Arthropoda
- Class: Insecta
- Order: Lepidoptera
- Family: Cosmopterigidae
- Genus: Anoncia
- Species: A. episcia

Binomial name
- Anoncia episcia (Walsingham, 1907)

Synonyms
- Hypatopa episcia Walsingham, 1907

= Anoncia episcia =

Species of moth

Anoncia episcia is a moth in the family Cosmopterigidae. It is found in the United States in California and Arizona.
