= Anoncia porriginosa =

Scientific classification
- Kingdom: Animalia
- Phylum: Arthropoda
- Clade: Pancrustacea
- Class: Insecta
- Order: Lepidoptera
- Family: Cosmopterigidae
- Genus: Anoncia
- Species: A. porriginosa

Binomial name
- Anoncia porriginosa Hodges, 1962

Species of moth

Anoncia porriginosa is a moth in the family Cosmopterigidae. It was described by Ronald W. Hodges in 1962. It is found in North America, where it has been recorded from California.
