= Anoncia sphacelina =

Scientific classification
- Domain: Eukaryota
- Kingdom: Animalia
- Phylum: Arthropoda
- Class: Insecta
- Order: Lepidoptera
- Family: Cosmopterigidae
- Genus: Anoncia
- Species: A. sphacelina

Binomial name
- Anoncia sphacelina (Keifer, 1935)

Synonyms
- Borkhausenia sphacelina Keifer, 1935

Species of moth

Anoncia sphacelina is a moth in the family Cosmopterigidae. It was described by Keifer in 1935. It is found in North America, where it has been recorded from California.

Adults have been recorded on wing from March to June.

The larvae feed on Lepechinia calycina.
