= Anoncia aciculata =

Scientific classification
- Kingdom: Animalia
- Phylum: Arthropoda
- Class: Insecta
- Order: Lepidoptera
- Family: Cosmopterigidae
- Genus: Anoncia
- Species: A. aciculata

Binomial name
- Anoncia aciculata (Meyrick, 1928)

Synonyms
- Borkhausenia aciculata Meyrick, 1928

Species of moth

Anoncia aciculata is a moth in the family Cosmopterigidae. It was described by Edward Meyrick in 1928. It is found in North America, where it has been recorded from Texas and Nevada.
