= Anoncia fasciata =

Scientific classification
- Domain: Eukaryota
- Kingdom: Animalia
- Phylum: Arthropoda
- Class: Insecta
- Order: Lepidoptera
- Family: Cosmopterigidae
- Genus: Anoncia
- Species: A. fasciata

Binomial name
- Anoncia fasciata (Walsingham, 1907)

Synonyms
- Hypatopa fasciata Walsingham, 1907

Species of moth

Anoncia fasciata is a moth in the family Cosmopterigidae. It is found in California, United States.
