= Bracon mellitor =

Scientific classification
- Kingdom: Animalia
- Phylum: Arthropoda
- Class: Insecta
- Order: Hymenoptera
- Family: Braconidae
- Genus: Bracon
- Species: B. mellitor

Binomial name
- Bracon mellitor (Say, 1836)

Species of wasp

Bracon mellitor is a species of braconid wasp in the family Braconidae. They are found in North America from South Dakota and Texas to the east. They feed on Coleoptera and Lepidoptera.
