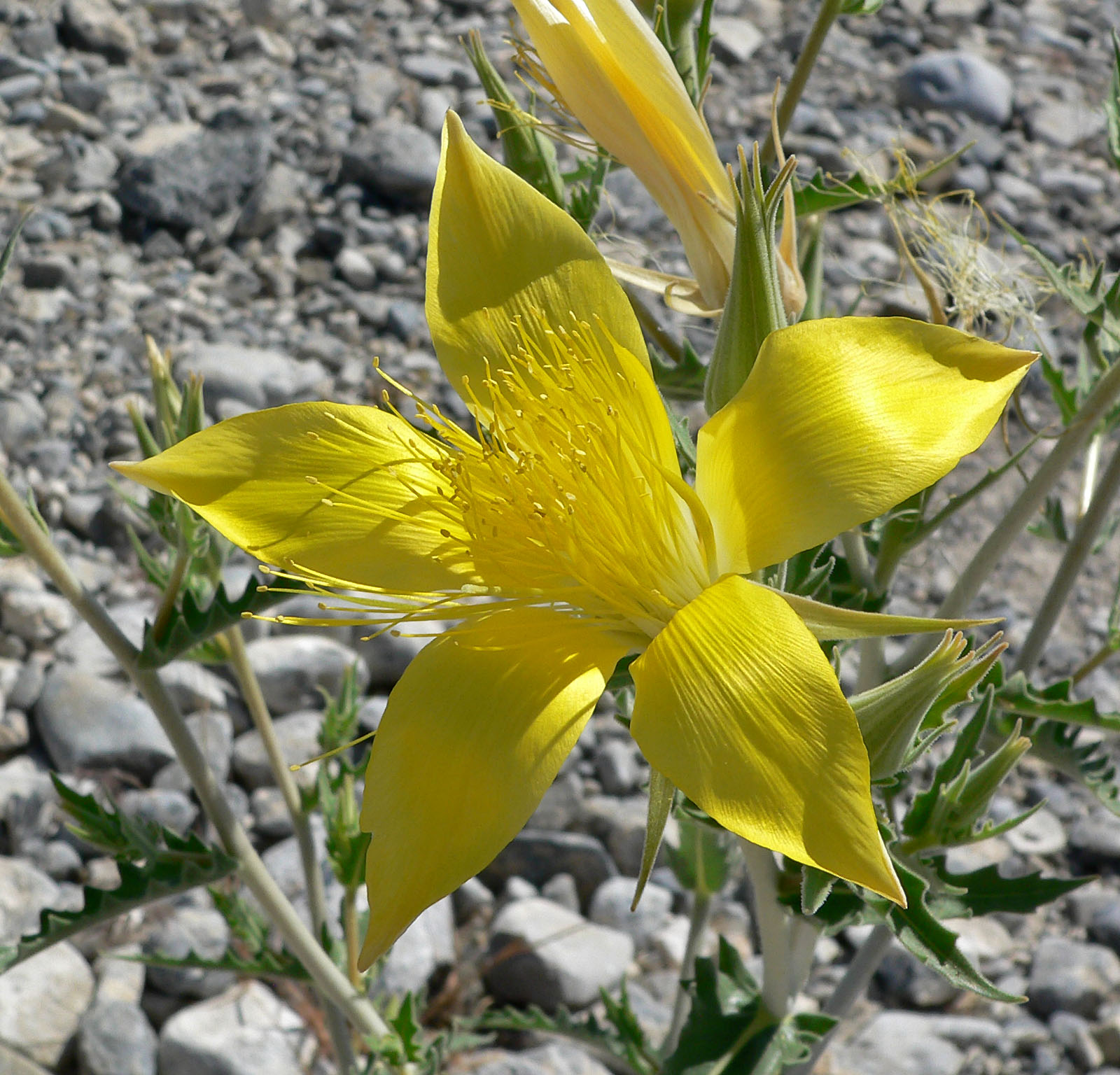

Scientific classification
- Kingdom: Plantae
- Clade: Embryophytes
- Clade: Tracheophytes
- Clade: Spermatophytes
- Clade: Angiosperms
- Clade: Eudicots
- Clade: Asterids
- Order: Cornales
- Family: Loasaceae
- Genus: Mentzelia
- Species: M. laevicaulis

Binomial name
- Mentzelia laevicaulis (Douglas ex Hook.) Torr. & A.Gray

Varieties
- M. laevicaulis var. laevicaulis; M. laevicaulis var. parviflora

= Mentzelia laevicaulis =

Plant species in the stickleaf family

Mentzelia laevicaulis is a showy biennial or short-lived perennial wildflower native to western North America. Its common names include giant blazingstar and smoothstem blazingstar.

This is a widespread plant which can be found in sandy, rocky, and disturbed areas, such as roadsides.

== Description ==
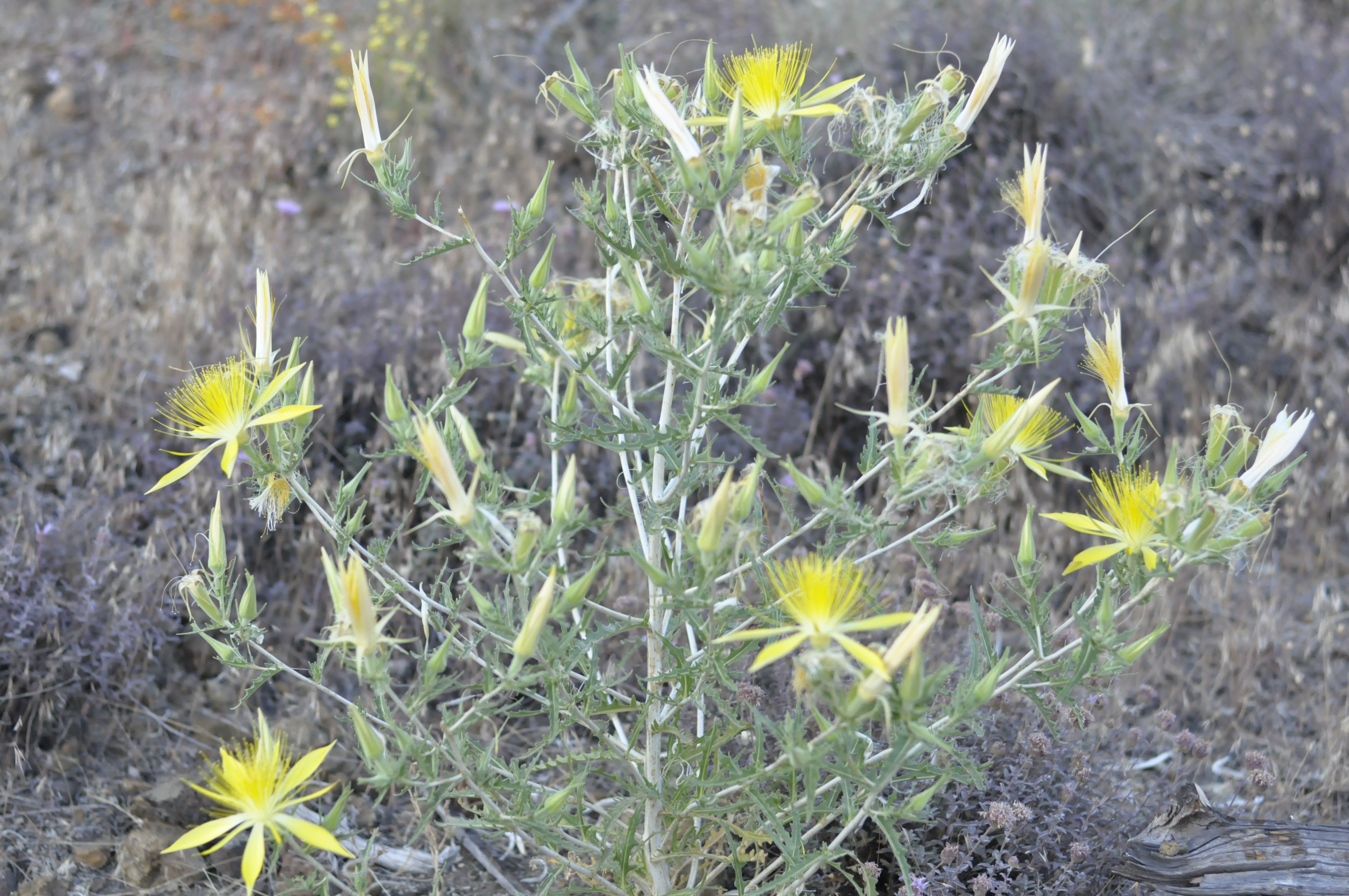
Yellow blazing star (Mentzelia laevicaulis)

It grows a branched stem which may reach a yard in height. The whitish-green stem and its lateral branches bear the occasional triangular sawtoothed leaf. The plant bears capsule fruits containing winged seeds.

At the tip of each branch blooms a spectacular yellow flower. The star-shaped flower has five narrow, pointed petals with shiny yellow surfaces, each up to 3 inches long. Between the petals are long, thin yellow sepals. The center of the open-faced flower is filled with a great many whiskery yellow stamens. Beneath the petals are long, curling bracts.

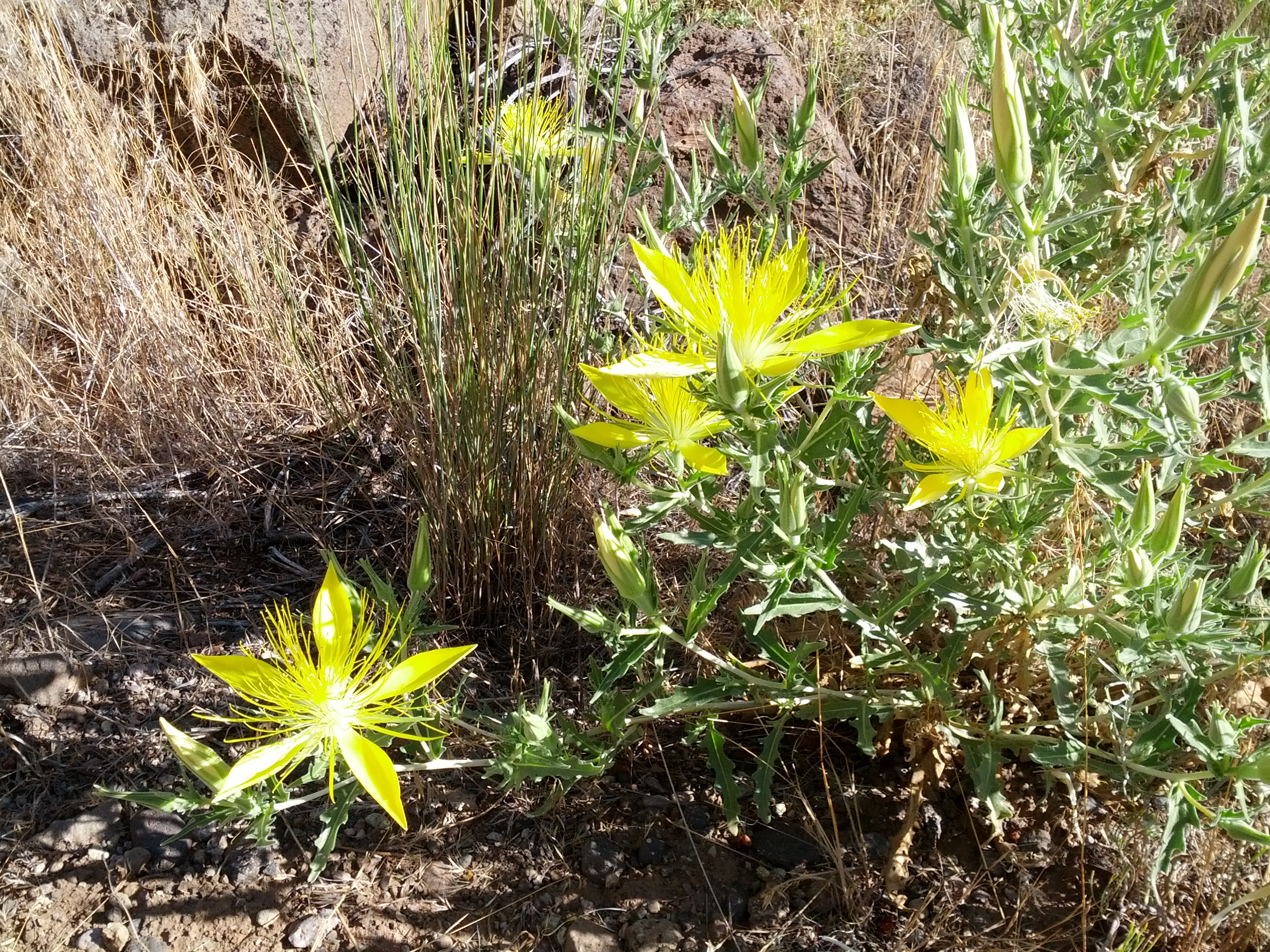
Mentzelia laevicaulis (Losaceae botanical family)
