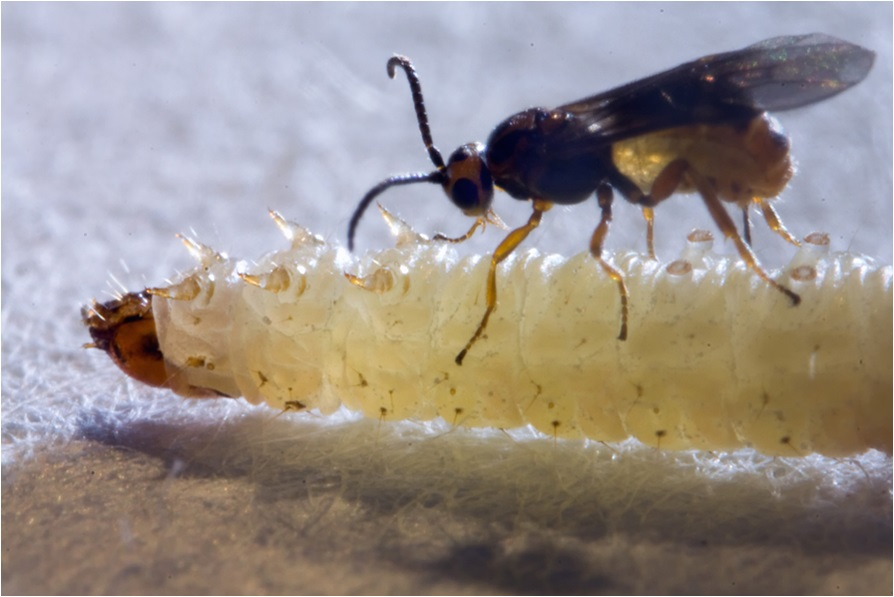
- Bracon brevicornis with host

Scientific classification
- Kingdom: Animalia
- Phylum: Arthropoda
- Clade: Pancrustacea
- Class: Insecta
- Order: Hymenoptera
- Family: Braconidae
- Subfamily: Braconinae
- Tribe: Braconini
- Genus: Bracon; Fabricius, 1805

Species
- 500+

= Bracon (wasp) =

Genus of wasps

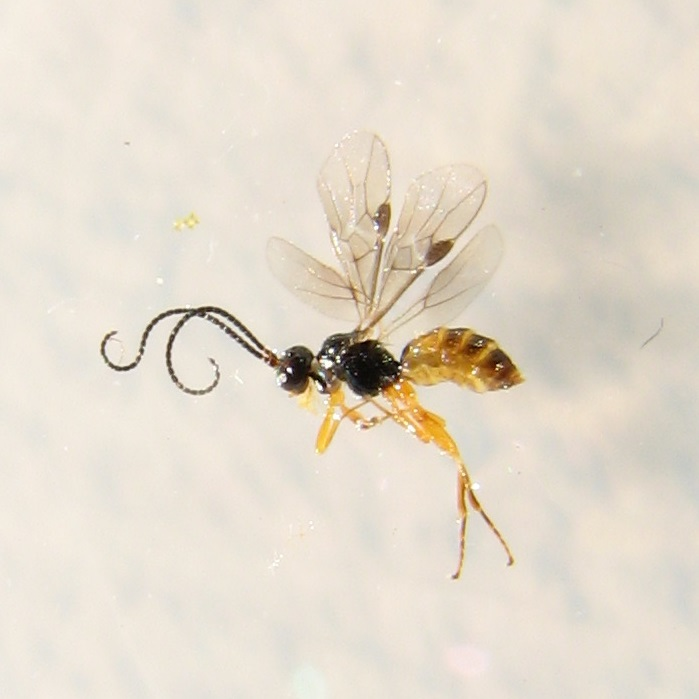
Bracon sp.

Bracon is a genus of wasps in the Braconidae, a family of parasitoid wasps. There are several hundred described species but there are thousands still undescribed. The genus is cosmopolitan, distributed throughout the world, with most of the described species occurring in the Palearctic realm.

These wasps are mostly ectoparasitoids, with the larvae developing on the outside of the body of the host. Recorded hosts include the larvae of many species of lepidopterans, beetles, flies, hymenopterans, and true bugs. They are idiobionts, halting the development of the host when they lay eggs on its body. Some Bracon wasps are specific to one host species, and some are known to utilize many different hosts. The eggs of the wasp can be very hardy. In one report, Bracon wasps oviposited on tortrix moth larvae, which then entered privet seeds and were consumed by birds along with the fruit. The wasp eggs were later excreted and the larvae emerged.

This large genus has been divided into several subgenera, some of which are further divided into species-groups. A DNA analysis showed that the genus is paraphyletic, that its subgenera and other defined groups are not all valid on a molecular basis, and that revising it into informal groups would be more practical. Other authors still divide the genus into subgenera using morphological characters to make identification easier.

Most of the thousands of species that fit into this genus have not yet been described, but even the number of named species is unclear, with estimates ranging from 500 to 1000.

Species include:

- Bracon acrobasidis
- Bracon agathymi
- Bracon americanus
- Bracon analcidis
- Bracon angelesius
- Bracon apicatus
- Bracon argutator
- Bracon bembeciae
- Bracon brachyurus
- Bracon brevicornis
- Bracon canadensis
- Bracon caudiger
- Bracon caulicola
- Bracon cephi
- Bracon cinctus
- Bracon connecticutorum
- Bracon confusus
- Bracon cuscutae
- Bracon cushmani
- Bracon erucarum
- Bracon furtivus
- Bracon gastroideae
- Bracon gelechiae
- Bracon gemmaecola
- Bracon geraei
- Bracon gossypii
- Bracon gracilis
- Bracon helianthi
- Bracon hemimenae
- Bracon hobomok
- Bracon hyslopi
- Bracon jani
- Bracon kirkpatricki
- Bracon konkapoti
- Bracon laemosacci
- Bracon lineatellae
- Bracon lissogaster
- Bracon lutus
- Bracon mellitor
- Bracon metacomet
- Bracon minutator
- Bracon montowesi
- Bracon nanus
- Bracon nevadensis
- Bracon niger
- Bracon nuperus
- Bracon oenotherae
- Bracon palliventris
- Bracon papaipemae
- Bracon pascuensis
- Bracon piceiceps
- Bracon piger
- Bracon pini
- Bracon podunkorum
- Bracon predatorius Ranjith & Quicke, 2022
- Bracon quinnipiacorum
- Bracon radicis
- Bracon rhyssomati
- Bracon rosaceani
- Bracon rufomarginatus
- Bracon sanninoideae
- Bracon scanticorum
- Bracon sesiae
- Bracon sphenophori
- Bracon sulcifrons
- Bracon tachypteri
- Bracon tenuiceps
- Bracon tenuis
- Bracon terebella
- Bracon tychii
- Bracon uncas
- Bracon unipunctatus Brullé, 1846
- Bracon variabilis
- Bracon vulgaris
- Bracon wawequa
- Bracon xanthonotus
