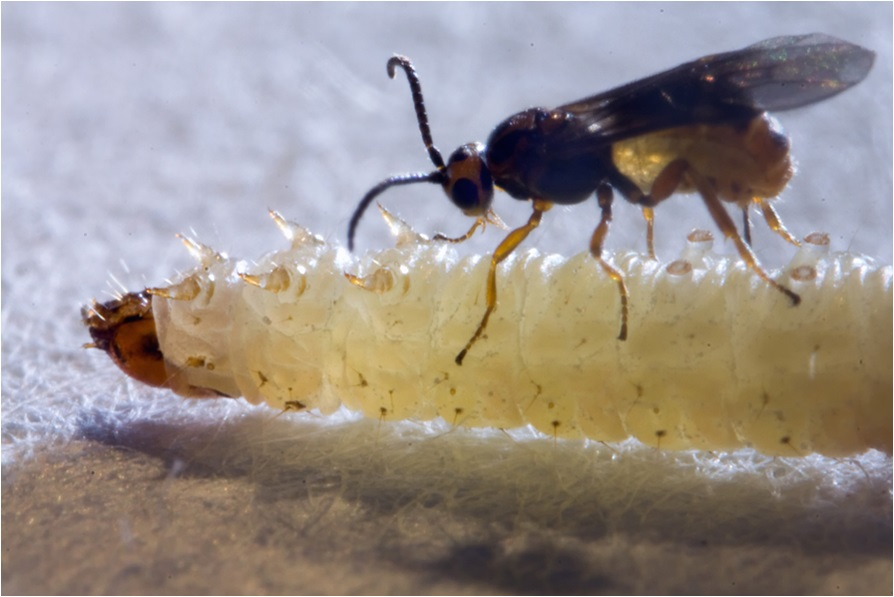
- Bracon brevicornis, female inserting ovipositor into paralyzed host.

Scientific classification
- Domain: Eukaryota
- Kingdom: Animalia
- Phylum: Arthropoda
- Class: Insecta
- Order: Hymenoptera
- Family: Braconidae
- Subfamily: Braconinae; Nees, 1811

Tribes
- See text

Synonyms
- Aphrastobraconinae Ashmead, 1900; Gnathobraconinae Szepligeti, 1904; Vipioninae Gahan, 1917; Microbraconinae Bridwell, 1920; Pseudodicrogeniinae Fahringer, 1936; Vaepellinae Quicke, 1987

= Braconinae =

Subfamily of wasps

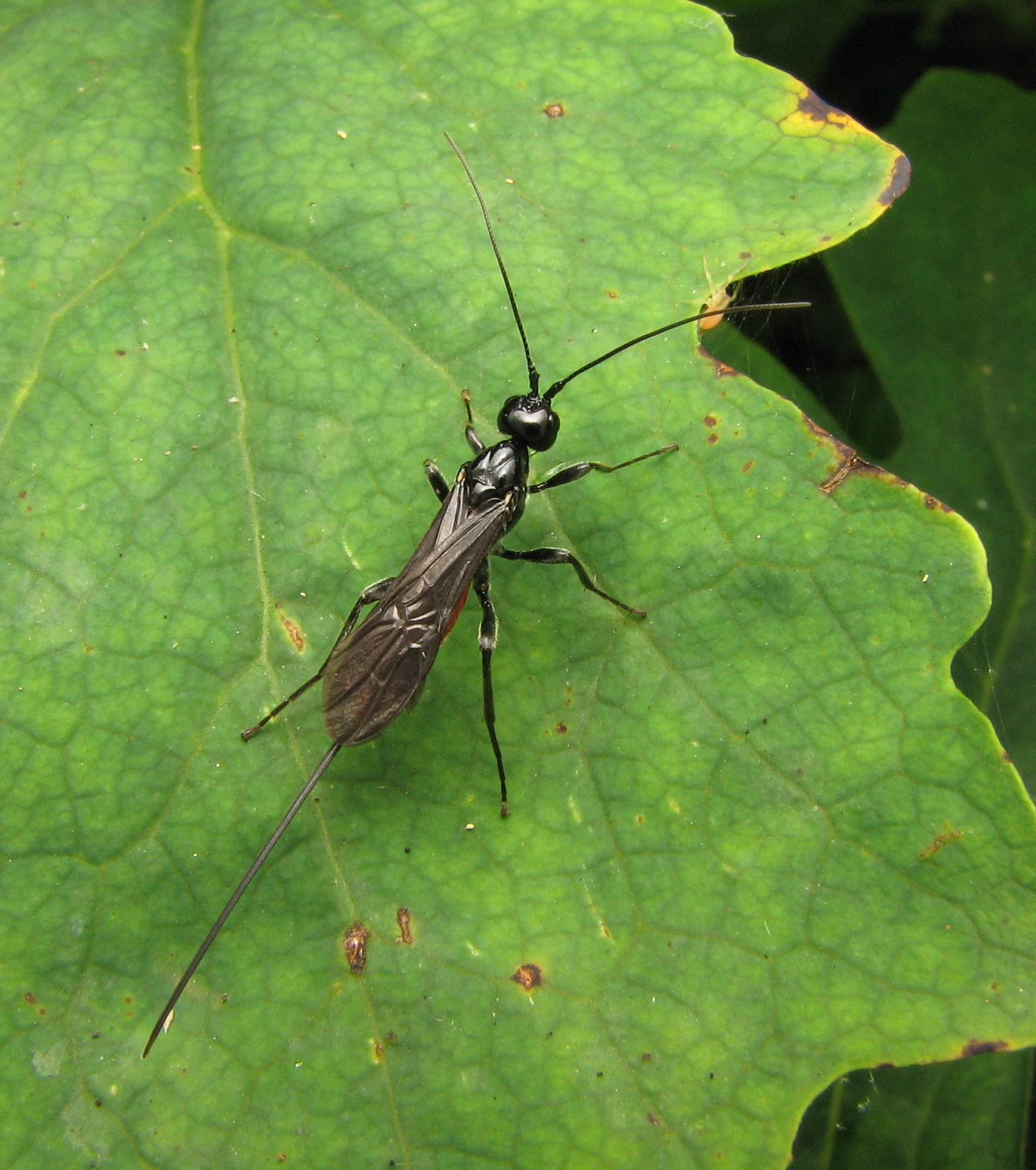
Atanycolus female

The Braconinae are a large subfamily of braconid parasitoid wasps with more than 2,000 described species. Many species, including Bracon brevicornis, have been used in biocontrol programs.

== Description and distribution ==
Braconines are small to medium sized wasps. Many are dark in color, but they can be red, orange, or pale. They have cyclostome mouthparts and females usually have a long ovipositor.

They are found worldwide, but are most diverse in the Paleotropical region.

== Biology ==
Braconines are idiobiont ectoparasitoids of concealed larvae. The hosts of most species are Lepidoptera or Coleoptera, with a few attacking Diptera or Symphyta. Usually, they paralyze the host with venom before laying one or more (depending on the species) large eggs on the host's exterior.

== Tribes ==
- Adeshini
- Aphrastobraconini
- Argamaniini
- Bathyaulacini
- Braconini
- Coeloidini
- Euurobraconini
- Glyptomorphini
- Gnathobraconini
- Physaraiini
- Rhammurini
- Vaepellini
