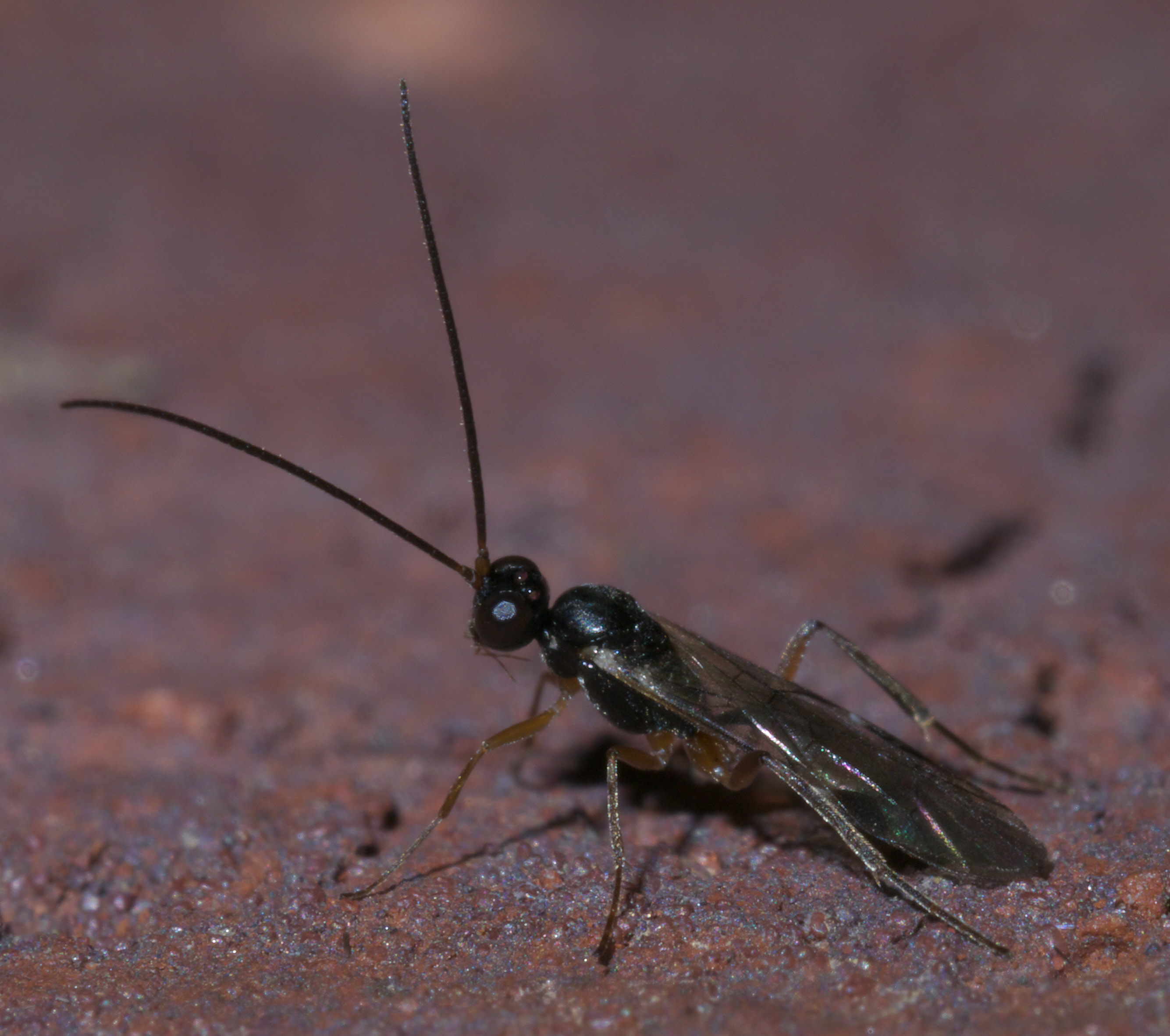

Scientific classification
- Kingdom: Animalia
- Phylum: Arthropoda
- Class: Insecta
- Order: Hymenoptera
- Family: Ichneumonidae
- Subfamily: Phygadeuontinae; Förster, 1869
- Tribe: Phygadeuontini; Förster, 1869

= Phygadeuontini =

Tribe of wasps

Phygadeuontini is a tribe of ichneumon wasps in the family Ichneumonidae. It is the only tribe in the subfamily Phygadeuontinae. There are about 123 genera in 12 subtribes worldwide.

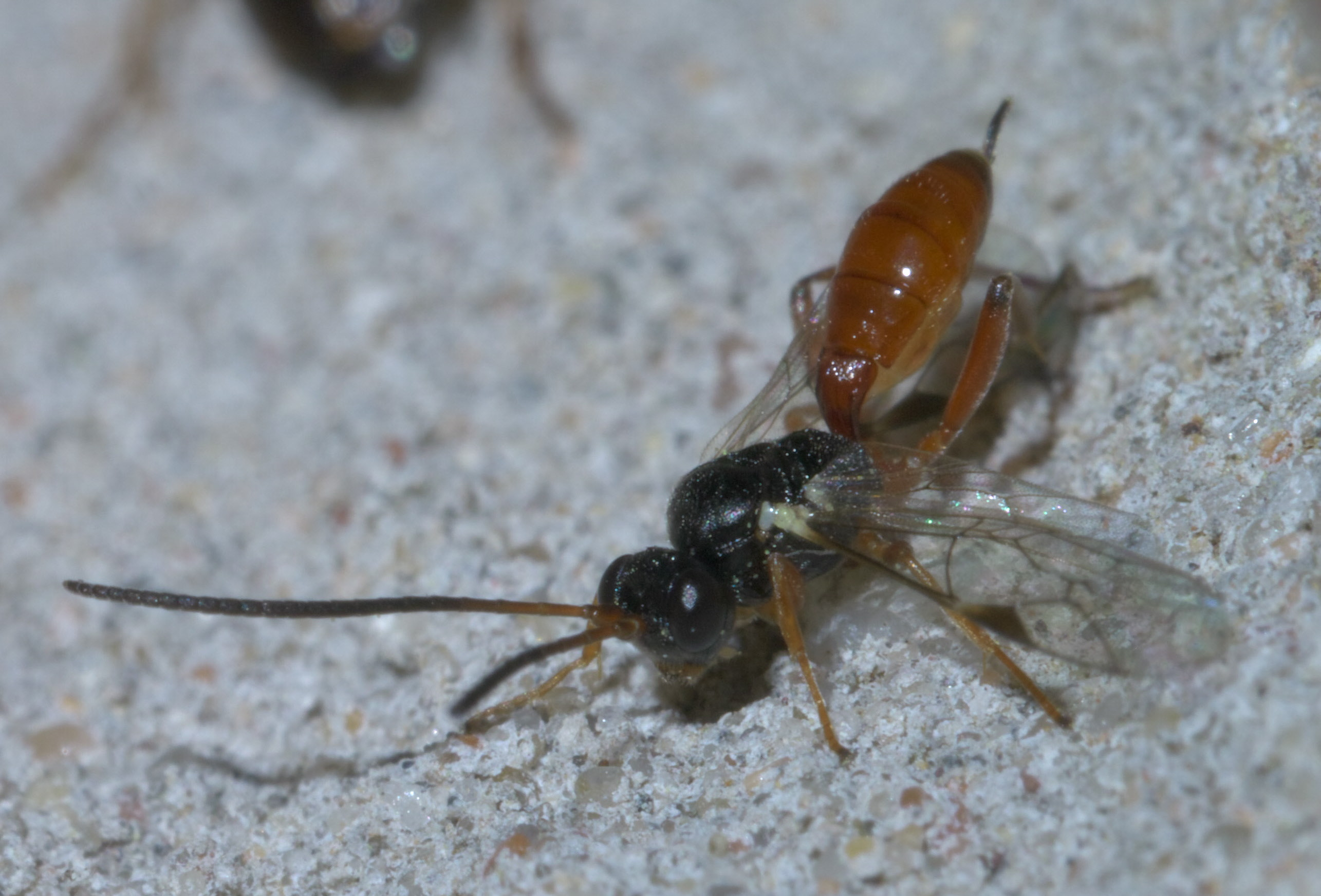

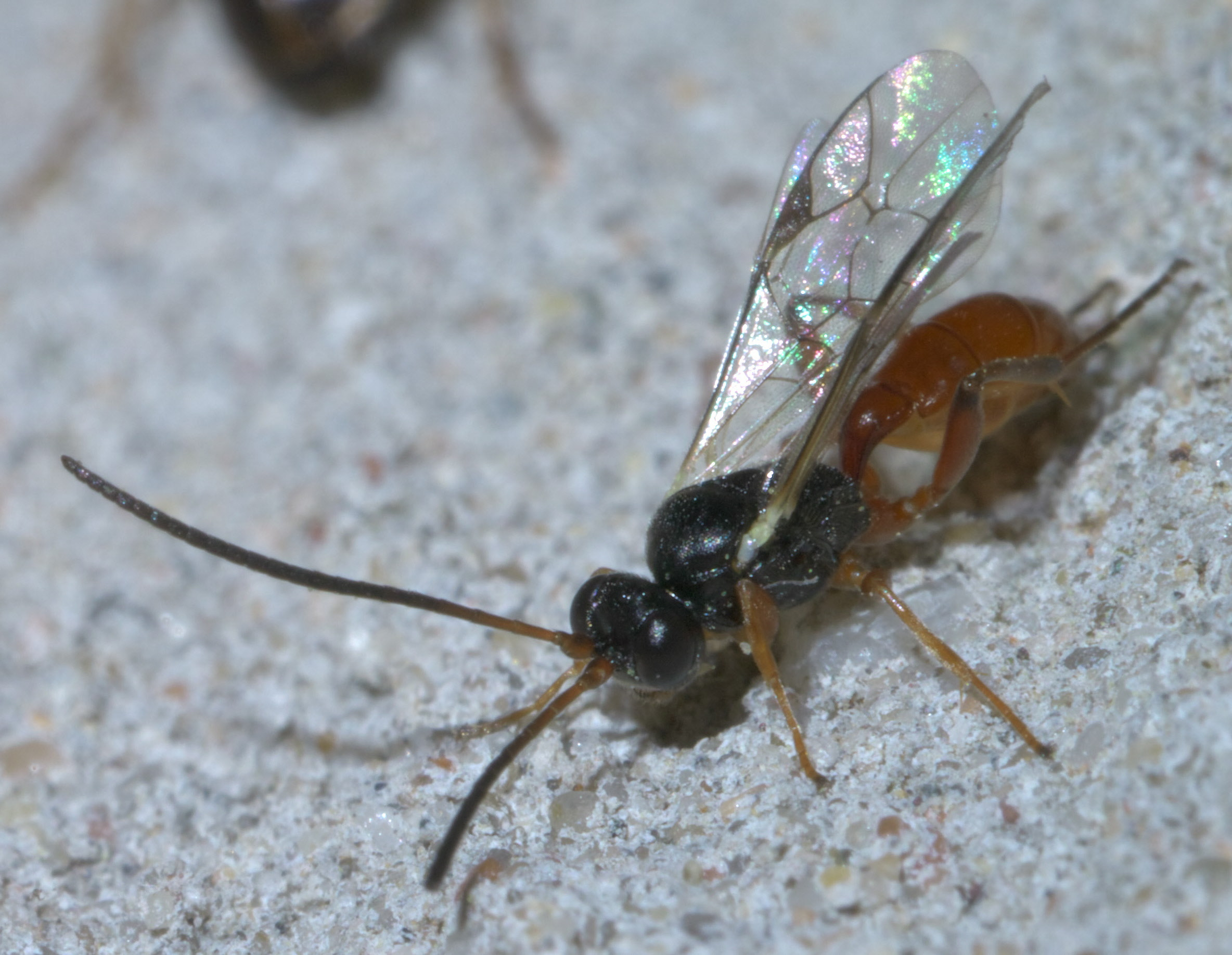

== Classification ==
The following classification of Phygadeuontini is based on Wahl (2014):

- Subtribe Acrolytina
  - Acidnus Townes, 1970a — Neotropical
  - Acrolyta Förster, 1869 — Ethiopian, Holarctic, Oriental
  - Brachedra Townes, 1970a — Neotropical
  - Cormobius Townes, 1970a — Nearctic, Neotropical
  - Diaglyptella Seyrig, 1952 — Ethiopian
  - Diaglyptelloides Aubert, 1993 — Palearctic
  - Diaglyptidea Viereck, 1913 — Holarctic, Neotropical, Oriental^{c g b}
  - Diatora Förster, 1869 — Ethiopian, Oriental, Palearctic
  - Encrateola Strand, 1916 — worldwide except Australian
  - Eudelus Förster, 1869 — Holarctic
  - Isdromas Förster, 1869^{c g b} — worldwide except Palearctic
  - Lysibia Förster, 1869^{c g b} — Holarctic, Neotropical, Oriental
  - Micraris Townes, 1970a — Oriental
  - Neopimpla Ashmead, 1900 — Ethiopian, Nearctic
  - Sozites Seyrig, 1952 — Ethiopian (Townes & Townes, 1973)
  - Stenotes Townes, 1970a — Neotropical
  - Trachaner Townes, 1970a — Neotropical
- Subtribe Bathytrichina
  - Apophysius Cushman, 1922 — Oriental
  - Bathythrix Förster, 1869^{i c g b} — worldwide except Australian
  - Chrysocryptus Cameron, 1902 — Oriental
  - Retalia Seyrig, 1952 — Ethiopian, Oriental, Palearctic
  - Rhabdosis Townes, 1970a — Neotropical
  - Surculus Townes, 1970a — Neotropical
- Subtribe Chiroticina
  - Asmenophylax Gauld, 1984 — Australian
  - Astomaspis Förster, 1869 — Australian, Ethiopian, Oriental
  - Bentyra Cameron, 1905 — Oriental
  - Bodedia Seyrig, 1952 — Ethiopian
  - Chirotica Förster, 1869 — worldwide^{c g b}
  - Diracela Townes, 1973 — Ethiopian
  - Dolichomastix Ceballos, 1924 — Ethiopian
  - Epelaspis Townes, 1970a — Ethiopian, Neotropical
  - Fractipons Townes, 1970a — Neotropical
  - Gabia Seyrig, 1952 — Ethiopian
  - Handaoia Seyrig, 1952 — worldwide except Nearctic
  - Lienella Cameron, 1905 (January) — Australian, Ethiopian, Oriental
  - Lissaspis Townes, 1970a — Neotropical
  - Mamelia Seyrig, 1952 — Ethiopian
  - Orientohemiteles Uchida, 1932 — Oriental
  - Palpostilpnus Aubert, 1961 — Oriental
  - Paraglyptus Seyrig, 1952 — Ethiopian
  - Paraphylax Förster, 1869 — Australian, Ethiopian, Oriental, Palearctic
  - Singalissaspis Jussila, 1998 — Oriental
- Subtribe Cremnodina
  - Cremnodes Förster, 1850 — Holarctic
  - Scrobiculus Townes, 1970a — Neotropical
  - Vestibulum Townes, 1970a — Neotropical
- Subtribe Endaseina
  - Amphibulus Kriechbaumer, 1893 — Holarctic, Neotropical
  - Cisaris Townes, 1970a — Oriental, Palearctic
  - Coptomystax Townes, 1970a — Oriental
  - Endasys Förster, 1869^{i c g b} — Holarctic
  - Glyphicnemis Förster, 1869^{c g b} — Holarctic
  - Grasseiteles Aubert, 1965 — Palearctic
  - Medophron Förster, 1869^{c g b} — Holarctic
  - Meringops Townes, 1970a — Australian, Neotropical (Gauld, 1984)
  - Tryonocryptus Gauld & Holloway, 1983 — Australian
- Subtribe Ethelurgina
  - Apoglutus Townes, 1970a — Oriental
  - Ethelurgus Förster, 1869 — Holarctic, Neotropical
  - Zamicrotoridea Viereck, 1917
  - Rhembobius Förster, 1869 — Holarctic
- Subtribe Gelina
  - Agasthenes Förster, 1869 — Hawaii, Holarctic
  - Blaspidotes Förster, 1869 — Palearctic (Schwarz, 1995)
  - Catalytus Förster, 1851 — Palearctic
  - Dichrogaster Doumerc, 1855^{c g b} — worldwide
  - Formocrytpus Uchida, 1931 — Oriental
  - Gelis Thunberg, 1827^{c g b} — worldwide
  - Thaumatogelis Schmiedeknecht, 1933 — Palearctic (Schwarz, 1995)
  - Townostilpnus Aubert, 1961 — Oriental, Palearctic
  - Xenolytus Förster, 1869 — Australian, Holarctic, Oriental
- Subtribe Hemitelina
  - Aclastus Förster, 1869 — worldwide
  - Amblyclastus Gauld, 1984 — Australian
  - Anurotropus Cushman, 1924 — Nearctic (Horstmann, 1992)
  - Austriteles Gauld, 1984 — Australian
  - Glyphaclastus Gauld, 1984 — Australian
  - Gynpetomorpha Förster, 1869 — Palearctic (Horstmann, 1992)
  - Hemiteles Gravenhorst, 1829 — Holarctic, Oriental
  - Obsiphaga Morley, 1907 — Holarctic
  - Pleurogyrus Townes, 1970a — Holarctic
  - Polyaulon Förster, 1869^{c g b} — Holarctic
  - Xiphulcus Townes, 1970a — Holarctic
- Subtribe Mastrina
  - Aclosmation Gauld, 1984 — Australian
  - Amydraulax Cushman, 1922 — Nearctic
  - Apotemnus Cushman, 1940 — Nearctic
  - Bilira Townes, 1970a — Neotropical
  - Brachypimpla Strobl, 1902 — Palearctic
  - Charitopes Förster, 1869 — Ethiopian, Holarctic, Neotropical (Townes, 1983)
  - Clypeoteles Horstmann, 1974 — Palearctic
  - Distathma Townes, 1970a — Neotropical, Oriental, Palearctic (Horstmann, 1978 & 1992)
  - Fianoniella Horstmann, 1992 — Holarctic
  - Helcostizus Förster, 1869^{c g b} — Holarctic
  - Indovia Seyrig, 1952 — Ethiopian (Horstmann, 1978 & 1992)
  - Isadelphus Förster, 1869 — Holarctic (Horstmann, 1978)
  - Lochetica Kriechbaumer, 1892 — Holarctic
  - Mastrulus Horstmann, 1978 — Palearctic
  - Mastrus Förster, 1869^{c g b} — Holarctic, Oriental
  - Micromonodon Förster, 1869 — Palearctic (Horstmann, 1978)
  - Odontoneura Förster, 1869 — Palearctic (Horstmann, 1978 & 1992)
  - Pygocryptus Roman, 1925^{c g b} — Holarctic
  - Teluncus Townes, 1970a — Neotropical
  - Zoophthorus Förster, 1869 — Palearctic (Horstmann, 1978)
- Subtribe Phygadeuontina
  - Arotrephes Townes, 1970a — Holarctic
  - Boleslawia Sawoniewcz, 1996 — Palearctic
  - Cephalobaris Kryger, 1915 — Palearctic (Horstmann, 1992)
  - Ceratophygadeuon Viereck, 1924 — Ethiopian, Holarctic
  - Gnotus Förster, 1869 — Holarctic, Oriental
  - Hedylus Förster, 1869 — Holarctic (Carlson, 1979)
  - Leptocryptoides Horstmann, 1976 — Palearctic
  - Megacara Townes, 1970a — Holarctic
  - Oecotelma Townes, 1970a — Holarctic
  - Orthizema Förster, 1869^{c g b} — Holarctic
  - Phygadeuon Gravenhorst, 1829^{i c g b} — Holarctic, Neotropical
  - Platyrhabdus Townes, 1970a — Palearctic
  - Stibeutes Förster, 1869 — Holarctic
  - Sulcarius Townes, 1970a^{i c g b} — Holarctic
  - Theroscopus Förster, 1850 — Holarctic, Oriental
  - Tricholinum Förster, 1869 — Oriental, Palearctic
  - Tropistes Gravenhorst, 1829 — Palearctic
  - Uchidella Townes, 1957 — Holarctic, Oriental
- Subtribe Rothneyiina
  - Hyparcha Townes, 1970a — Oriental
  - Nipponaetes Uchida, 1933 — Australian, Ethiopian, Oriental
  - Rothneyia Cameron, 1897 — Oriental
- Subtribe Stilpnina
  - Atractodes Gravenhorst, 1829^{c g b} — Ethiopian, Holarctic
  - Mesoleptus Gravenhorst, 1829 — Ethiopian, Oriental, Holarctic
  - Exolytus Holmgren, 1858
  - Stilpnus Gravenhorst, 1829 — Holarctic, Oriental
- incertae sedis
  - Rhadinomastrus Gauld, 1984 — Australian

Additional data sources: i = ITIS, c = Catalogue of Life, g = GBIF, b = Bugguide.net
