= List of Endasys species =

This is a list of 124 species in Endasys, a genus of ichneumon wasps in the family Ichneumonidae.

== Endasys species ==
- Endasys albior Luhman, 1990^{i c g}
- Endasys albitexanus Luhman, 1990^{i c g}
- Endasys alutaceus (Habermehl, 1912)^{c g}
- Endasys amoenus (Habermehl, 1912)^{c g}
- Endasys analis (Thomson, 1883)^{c g}
- Endasys anglianus Sawoniewicz & Luhman, 1992^{c g}
- Endasys angularis Luhman, 1990^{i c g}
- Endasys annulatus (Habermehl, 1912)^{c g}
- Endasys areolellae Sawoniewicz & Luhman, 1992^{c g}
- Endasys arizonae Luhman, 1990^{i c g}
- Endasys arkansensis Luhman, 1990^{i c g}
- Endasys aurantifex Luhman, 1990^{i c g}
- Endasys aurarius Luhman, 1990^{i c g}
- Endasys aureolus Luhman, 1990^{i c g}
- Endasys auriculiferus (Viereck, 1917)^{i c g}
- Endasys aurigena Luhman, 1990^{i c g}
- Endasys auriger Luhman, 1990^{i c g}
- Endasys bicolor (Lundbeck, 1897)^{i c g}
- Endasys bicolorescens Luhman, 1990^{i c g}
- Endasys brachyceratus Luhman, 1990^{i c g}
- Endasys brevicornis Luhman, 1990^{i c g}
- Endasys brevis (Gravenhorst, 1829)^{c g}
- Endasys brunnulus Sawoniewicz & Luhman, 1992^{c g}
- Endasys callidius Luhman, 1990^{i c g}
- Endasys callistus Luhman, 1990^{i c g}
- Endasys chiricahuanus Luhman, 1990^{i c g}
- Endasys chrysoleptus Luhman, 1990^{i c g}
- Endasys cnemargus (Gravenhorst, 1829)^{c g}
- Endasys concavus Luhman, 1990^{i c g}
- Endasys coriaceus Luhman, 1990^{i c g}
- Endasys daschi Luhman, 1990^{i c g}
- Endasys declivis Luhman, 1990^{i c g}
- Endasys durangensis Luhman, 1990^{i c g}
- Endasys elegantulus Luhman, 1990^{i c g}
- Endasys erythrogaster (Gravenhorst, 1829)^{c g}
- Endasys eurycerus (Thomson, 1896)^{c g}
- Endasys euryops Luhman, 1990^{i c g}
- Endasys euxestus (Speiser, 1908)^{c g}
- Endasys femoralis (Habermehl, 1912)^{c g}
- Endasys flavissimus Luhman, 1990^{i c g}
- Endasys flavivittatus Luhman, 1990^{i c g}
- Endasys gibbosus Gonzalez-Moreno & Bordera^{g}
- Endasys gracilis Luhman, 1990^{i c g}
- Endasys granulifacies Luhman, 1990^{c g}
- Endasys hesperus Luhman, 1990^{i c g}
- Endasys hexamerus Luhman, 1990^{i c g}
- Endasys hungarianus Sawoniewicz & Luhman, 1992^{c g}
- Endasys inflatus (Provancher, 1875)^{i c g}
- Endasys julianus Luhman, 1990^{i c g}
- Endasys kinoshitai Uchida, 1955^{c g}
- Endasys latissimus Luhman, 1990^{i c g}
- Endasys leioleptus Luhman, 1990^{i c g}
- Endasys leopardus Luhman, 1990^{i c g}
- Endasys leptotexanus Luhman, 1990^{i c g}
- Endasys leucocnemis Luhman, 1990^{i c g}
- Endasys liaoningensis Wang, Sun, Ma & Sheng, 1996^{c g}
- Endasys lissorulus Sawoniewicz & Luhman, 1992^{c g}
- Endasys lygaeonematus (Uchida, 1931)^{c g}
- Endasys maculatus (Provancher, 1875)^{i c g}
- Endasys magnocellus Sawoniewicz & Luhman, 1992^{c g}
- Endasys megamelanus Sawoniewicz & Luhman, 1992^{c g}
- Endasys melanistus Sawoniewicz & Luhman, 1992^{c g}
- Endasys melanogaster Luhman, 1990^{i c g}
- Endasys melanopodis Sawoniewicz & Luhman, 1992^{c g}
- Endasys melanurus (Roman, 1909)^{i c g}
- Endasys michiganensis Luhman, 1990^{i c g}
- Endasys microcellus Sawoniewicz & Luhman, 1992^{c g}
- Endasys minutulus (Thomson, 1883)^{i c g}
- Endasys monticola (Dalla Torre, 1902)^{i c g}
- Endasys morulus (Kokujev, 1909)^{c g}
- Endasys mucronatus (Provancher, 1879)^{i c}
- Endasys nemati Luhman, 1990^{i c g}
- Endasys nigrans Luhman, 1990^{i c g}
- Endasys nitidus (Habermehl, 1912)^{c g}
- Endasys obscurus Luhman, 1990^{i c g}
- Endasys occipitis Luhman, 1990^{i c g}
- Endasys oregonianus Luhman, 1990^{i c g}
- Endasys paludicola (Brues, 1908)^{i c g}
- Endasys parviventris (Gravenhorst, 1829)^{c g}
- Endasys patulus (Viereck, 1911)^{i c}
- Endasys pentacrocus Luhman, 1990^{i c g}
- Endasys petiolus Sawoniewicz & Luhman, 1992^{c g}
- Endasys pieninus Sawoniewicz & Luhman, 1992^{c g}
- Endasys pinidiprionis Luhman, 1990^{i c g}
- Endasys plagiator (Gravenhorst, 1829)^{c g}
- Endasys praegracilis Sawoniewicz & Luhman, 1992^{c g}
- Endasys praerotundiceps Luhman, 1990^{i c g}
- Endasys proteuryopsis Sawoniewicz & Luhman, 1992^{c g}
- Endasys pseudocallistus Luhman, 1990^{i c g}
- Endasys pubescens (Provancher, 1974)^{i c g}
- Endasys punctatior Luhman, 1990^{i c g}
- Endasys rhyssotexanus Luhman, 1990^{i c g}
- Endasys rotundiceps (Provancher, 1877)^{i c g}
- Endasys rubescens Luhman, 1990^{i c g}
- Endasys rugiceps Luhman, 1990^{i c g}
- Endasys rugifacies Sawoniewicz & Luhman, 1992^{c g}
- Endasys rugitexanus Luhman, 1990^{i c g}
- Endasys rugosus Luhman, 1990^{i c g}
- Endasys rusticus (Habermehl, 1912)^{c}
- Endasys santacruzensis Luhman, 1990^{i c g}
- Endasys senilis (Gmelin, 1790)^{c g}
- Endasys serratus Luhman, 1990^{i c g}
- Endasys sheni Sheng, 2000^{c g}
- Endasys spicus Luhman, 1990^{i c g}
- Endasys spinissimus Luhman, 1990^{i c g}
- Endasys stictogastris Sawoniewicz & Luhman, 1992^{c g}
- Endasys striatus (Kiss, 1924)^{c g}
- Endasys subclavatus (Say, 1836)^{i c g b}
- Endasys sugiharai (Uchida, 1936)^{c g}
- Endasys taiganus Luhman, 1990^{i c g}
- Endasys talitzkii (Telenga, 1961)^{c g}
- Endasys testaceipes (Brischke, 1891)^{c g}
- Endasys testaceus (Taschenberg, 1865)^{c}
- Endasys tetralylus Luhman, 1990^{i g}
- Endasys tetratylus Luhman, 1990^{c g}
- Endasys texanus (Cresson)^{i c}
- Endasys thunbergi Sawoniewicz & Luhman, 1992^{c g}
- Endasys transverseareolatus (Strobl, 1901)^{c g}
- Endasys triannulatus Sawoniewicz & Luhman, 1992^{c g}
- Endasys tricoloratus Luhman, 1990^{i c g}
- Endasys tyloidiphorus Luhman, 1990^{i c g}
- Endasys varipes (Gravenhorst, 1829)^{c g}
- Endasys xanthopyrrhus Luhman, 1990^{i c g}
- Endasys xanthostomus Luhman, 1990^{i c g}

Data sources: i = ITIS, c = Catalogue of Life, g = GBIF, b = Bugguide.net
