= Stilpnus =

Stilpnus may refer to:

- Stilpnus (wasp), a genus of wasps in the family Ichneumonidae
- Stilpnus, a genus of beetles in the family Elateridae; synonym of Ignelater
