= Stibeutes =

Scientific classification
- Domain: Eukaryota
- Kingdom: Animalia
- Phylum: Arthropoda
- Class: Insecta
- Order: Hymenoptera
- Family: Ichneumonidae
- Tribe: Phygadeuontini
- Genus: Stibeutes; Forster, 1869

Synonyms
- Chamaezelus Förster, 1869; Schizopleuron Aubert, 1968

Genus of insects

Stibeutes is a genus of parasitoid wasps belonging to the family Ichneumonidae.

== Species ==
Stibeutes contains the following species.

- Stibeutes blandi Schwarz & Shaw, 2011
- Stibeutes breviareolatus (Thomson, 1884)
- Stibeutes brevicornis (Lange, 1911)
- Stibeutes calderonae Bordera & Hernández-Rodríguez, 2004
- Stibeutes cinctellus (Fonscolombe, 1851)
- Stibeutes curvispina (Thomson, 1884)
- Stibeutes gravenhorstii Förster, 1850
- Stibeutes heinemanni Förster, 1850
- Stibeutes heterogaster (Thomson, 1885)
- Stibeutes hirsutus Bordera & Hernandez-Rodriguez, 2004
- Stibeutes infernalis (Ruthe, 1859)
- Stibeutes intermedius Horstmann, 2010
- Stibeutes nigrinus Horstmann, 2010
- Stibeutes pedestrator Aubert, 1982
- Stibeutes pilosus Horstmann, 1993
- Stibeutes rozsypali (Gregor, 1941)
- Stibeutes tricinctor (Aubert, 1968)
- Stibeutes yuasai (Bradley, 1918)
