= Aclastus =

Scientific classification
- Kingdom: Animalia
- Phylum: Arthropoda
- Class: Insecta
- Order: Hymenoptera
- Family: Ichneumonidae
- Subfamily: Phygadeuontinae
- Genus: Aclastus; Förster, 1868

Extant species
- See text

Genus of wasps

Aclastus is a genus of wasps belonging to the family Ichneumonidae. The genus was described in 1868 by Förster and has cosmopolitan distribution.

== Species ==
- Aclastus gracilis (Thomson, 1884)
- Aclastus micator (Gravenhorst, 1807)
