= Neopimpla =

Scientific classification
- Kingdom: Animalia
- Phylum: Arthropoda
- Class: Insecta
- Order: Hymenoptera
- Family: Ichneumonidae
- Subfamily: Phygadeuontinae
- Tribe: Phygadeuontini
- Subtribe: Acrolytina
- Genus: Neopimpla; Ashmead, 1900

Synonyms
- Microceratops Seyrig, 1952

Genus of wasps

Neopimpla is a genus of ichneumonid wasp. A junior synonym, Microceratops, was intermittently applied to a genus of ceratopsian dinosaur currently renamed as Microceratus.
