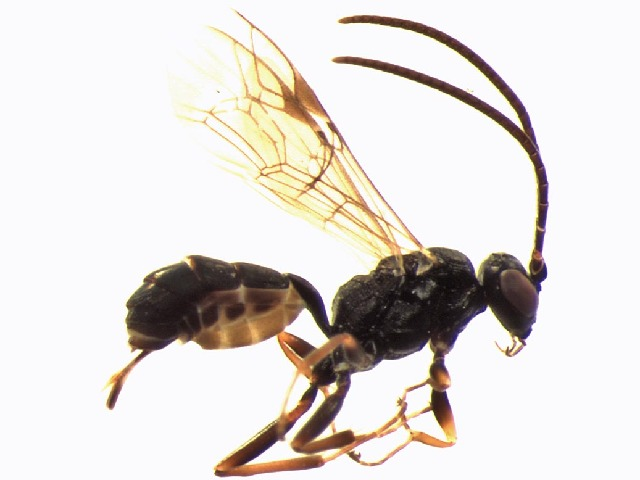

Scientific classification
- Kingdom: Animalia
- Phylum: Arthropoda
- Class: Insecta
- Order: Hymenoptera
- Family: Ichneumonidae
- Subfamily: Phygadeuontinae
- Tribe: Phygadeuontini
- Subtribe: Acrolytina
- Genus: Acrolyta; Förster, 1868

Extant species
- Acrolyta nens; Acrolyta rufocincta

= Acrolyta =

Genus of wasps

Acrolyta is a genus of wasps belonging to the family Ichneumonidae. The genus was described in 1868 by Arnold Förster and has cosmopolitan distribution. It is a parasitoid of Cotesia wasps.

== Species ==
- Acrolyta nens (Hartig, 1838)
- Acrolyta rufocincta (Gravenhorst, 1829)
