= Endasys subclavatus =

Scientific classification
- Kingdom: Animalia
- Phylum: Arthropoda
- Class: Insecta
- Order: Hymenoptera
- Family: Ichneumonidae
- Genus: Endasys
- Species: E. subclavatus

Binomial name
- Endasys subclavatus (Say, 1836)

Synonyms
- Cryptus subclavatus Say, 1836

Species of wasp

Endasys subclavatus is a species of ichneumon wasp in the family Ichneumonidae. It is specifically a parasite of Neodiprion cocoons.
