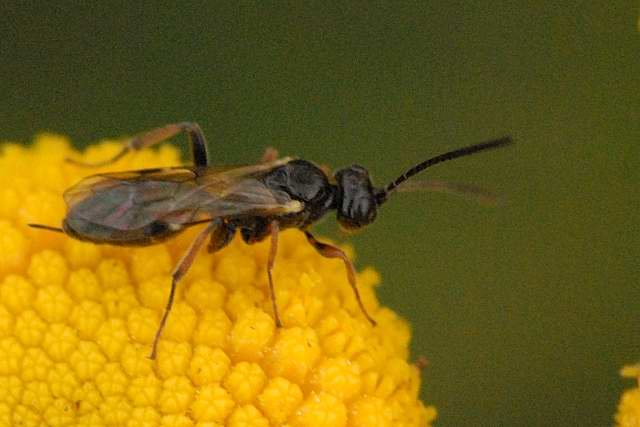
- Phygadeuon hercynicus

Scientific classification
- Kingdom: Animalia
- Phylum: Arthropoda
- Class: Insecta
- Order: Hymenoptera
- Family: Ichneumonidae
- Subfamily: Phygadeuontinae
- Tribe: Phygadeuontini
- Genus: Phygadeuon; Gravenhorst, 1829

= Phygadeuon =

Genus of insects

Phygadeuon is a genus of parasitoid wasps belonging to the family Ichneumonidae.

The genus has almost cosmopolitan distribution.

Selected species:

- Phygadeuon aciculatus Ratzeburg, 1852
- Phygadeuon acutipennis Thomson, 1884
- Phygadeuon hercynicus Gravenhorst, 1829
- Phygadeuon subfuscus Cresson, 1864
