= Glyphicnemis =

Scientific classification
- Kingdom: Animalia
- Phylum: Arthropoda
- Class: Insecta
- Order: Hymenoptera
- Family: Ichneumonidae
- Subfamily: Phygadeuontinae
- Tribe: Phygadeuontini
- Subtribe: Endaseina
- Genus: Glyphicnemis; Förster, 1869

Synonyms
- Gnathocryptus Thomson, 1873

Genus of wasps

Glyphicnemis is a small genus of parasitoid wasps in the family Ichneumonidae that occurs in the Holarctic and Indo-Malaysian region. There are 13 described species.

== Species ==
- G. atrata (Strobl, 1901)
- G. brevioides (Uchida, 1952)
- G. californica (Cresson, 1879)
- G. clypealis (Thomson, 1883)
- G. mandibularis (Cresson, 1864)
- G. nigrifemorum Luhman, 1986
- G. osakensis (Uchida, 1930)
- G. profligator (Fabricius, 1775)
- G. satoi (Uchida, 1930)
- G. townesi Ciochia, 1973
- G. vagabunda (Gravenhorst, 1829)
- G. vulgaris Luhman, 1986
- G. watanabei (Uchida, 1930)
