= Bathythrix triangularis =

Scientific classification
- Kingdom: Animalia
- Phylum: Arthropoda
- Class: Insecta
- Order: Hymenoptera
- Family: Ichneumonidae
- Genus: Bathythrix
- Species: B. triangularis

Binomial name
- Bathythrix triangularis (Cresson, 1868)

Species of wasp

Bathythrix triangularis is a species of ichneumon wasp in the family Ichneumonidae. It is found in North America.
