= Phygadeuon subfuscus =

Scientific classification
- Domain: Eukaryota
- Kingdom: Animalia
- Phylum: Arthropoda
- Class: Insecta
- Order: Hymenoptera
- Family: Ichneumonidae
- Genus: Phygadeuon
- Species: P. subfuscus

Binomial name
- Phygadeuon subfuscus Cresson, 1864

Synonyms
- Phygadeuon crassicornis (Provancher, 1886)

Species of wasp

Phygadeuon subfuscus is a hyperparasitoid wasp. Its hosts are the larvae of tachinid flies. It is distributed in North America.
