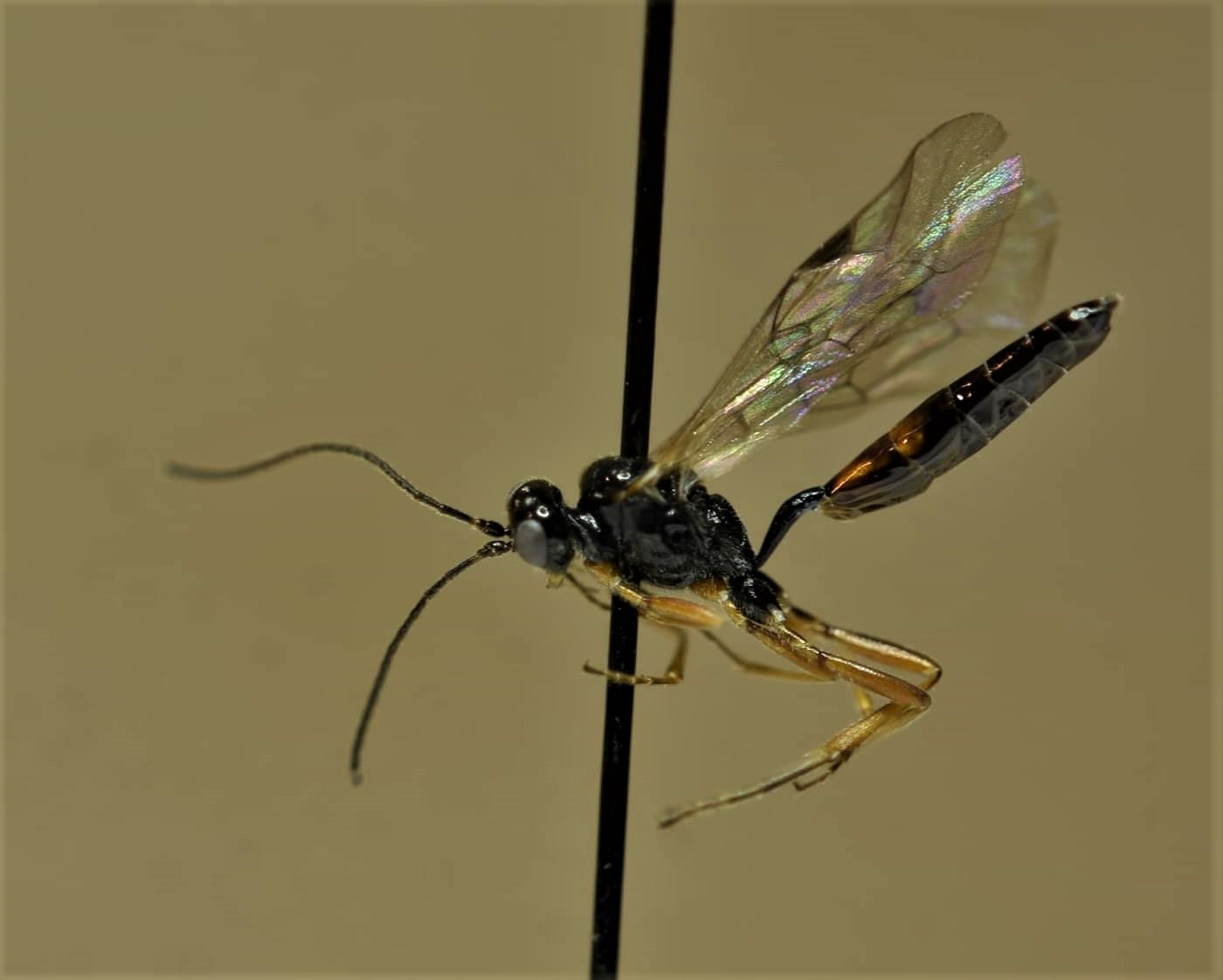
- Atractodes bicolor

Scientific classification
- Domain: Eukaryota
- Kingdom: Animalia
- Phylum: Arthropoda
- Class: Insecta
- Order: Hymenoptera
- Family: Ichneumonidae
- Subfamily: Phygadeuontinae
- Tribe: Phygadeuontini
- Genus: Atractodes; Gravenhorst, 1829

= Atractodes =

Genus of wasps

Atractodes is a genus of parasitoid wasps belonging to the family Ichneumonidae.

The genus was first described by Johann Ludwig Christian Gravenhorst in 1829.

Species:

- Atractodes albovinctus
- Atractodes angustipennis
- Atractodes croceicornis
- Atractodes ficticius
- Atractodes gilvipes
- Atractodes pauxillus
