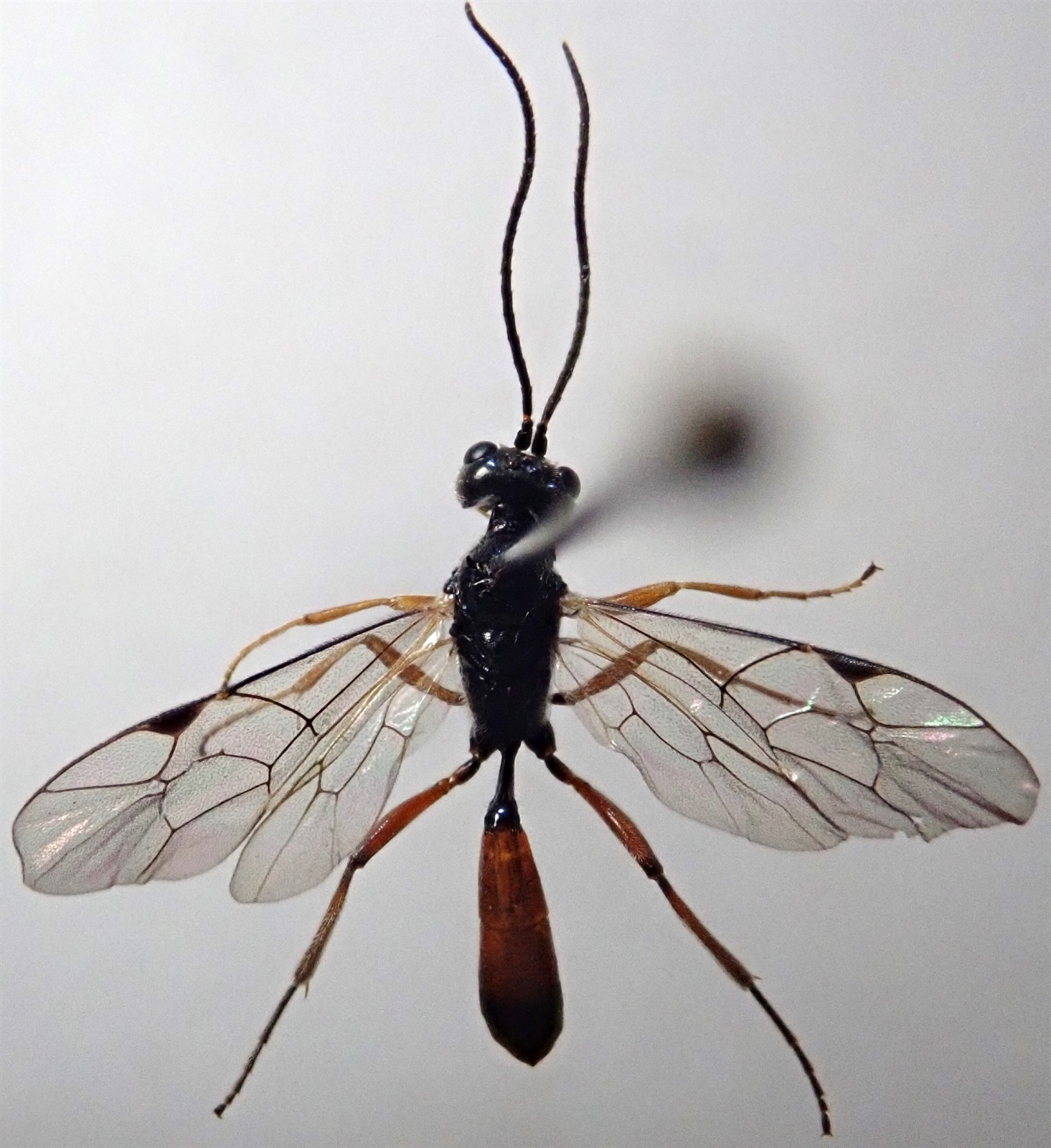
- Mesoleptus laticinctus, Norway

Scientific classification
- Kingdom: Animalia
- Phylum: Arthropoda
- Clade: Pancrustacea
- Class: Insecta
- Order: Hymenoptera
- Family: Ichneumonidae
- Subfamily: Phygadeuontinae
- Tribe: Phygadeuontini
- Genus: Mesoleptus; Gravenhorst, 1829

= Mesoleptus =

Genus of wasps

Mesoleptus is a genus of parasitic wasp in the family Ichneumonidae with a wide geographic distribution.

The antennae of its members are typically long, slender, and usually curved. The head is short and narrow with oval, slightly protruding eyes. The thorax is somewhat humped, with small wings. The cellules of the wings, which are small enclosed areas between veins, are either very small or entirely absent. It is characterized by the narrowed abdomen referred to as a petiole. Abdomen shape is usually oblong and smooth. The legs are slender and long, although the hindmost leg can be thickened.

In 2008, Dr. Chris Williams at the National University of Ireland, Galway announced the discovery of what he believed to be a new species of Mesoleptus, for which he suggested the name Mesoleptus hibernica (for the ancient Latin name for Ireland) in an interview. However, the species has yet to be confirmed or published, and is therefore not a valid species name.

172 of the more than 200 species were described by Arnold Förster of Aachen, Germany.

== species ==
These 215 species belong to the genus Mesoleptus.

- Mesoleptus adaequator (Forster, 1876)
- Mesoleptus adversarius (Forster, 1876)
- Mesoleptus aequilatus (Forster, 1876)
- Mesoleptus aggressorius (Forster, 1876)
- Mesoleptus agilis (Forster, 1876)
- Mesoleptus agnatus (Forster, 1876)
- Mesoleptus albolineatus Gravenhorst, 1829
- Mesoleptus alticola (Forster, 1876)
- Mesoleptus ambiguus (Forster, 1876)
- Mesoleptus ambulator (Forster, 1876)
- Mesoleptus anceps (Forster, 1876)
- Mesoleptus anguinus (Forster, 1876)
- Mesoleptus angustulus (Forster, 1876)
- Mesoleptus annexus (Forster, 1876)
- Mesoleptus anxius (Forster, 1876)
- Mesoleptus apertus Brues, 1910
- Mesoleptus approximatus (Forster, 1876)
- Mesoleptus arridens Gravenhorst, 1829
- Mesoleptus arrogans (Forster, 1876)
- Mesoleptus assimilis (Forster, 1876)
- Mesoleptus attenuatus (Forster, 1876)
- Mesoleptus auxiliarius (Forster, 1876)
- Mesoleptus beneplacitus (Forster, 1876)
- Mesoleptus biguttulus Gravenhorst, 1829
- Mesoleptus binoculus (Forster, 1876)
- Mesoleptus binominatus Smith, 1853
- Mesoleptus biosteres (Forster, 1876)
- Mesoleptus bipartitus (Fonscolombe, 1852)
- Mesoleptus bizonulis (Forster, 1876)
- Mesoleptus blandus (Forster, 1876)
- Mesoleptus borealis (Davis, 1898)
- Mesoleptus brevis (Forster, 1876)
- Mesoleptus callidus (Forster, 1876)
- Mesoleptus carinatus (Forster, 1876)
- Mesoleptus circumspectus (Forster, 1876)
- Mesoleptus coarctatus (Gravenhorst, 1829)
- Mesoleptus commixtus (Forster, 1876)
- Mesoleptus complacens (Forster, 1876)
- Mesoleptus comptus (Forster, 1876)
- Mesoleptus concinnus (Forster, 1876)
- Mesoleptus concors (Forster, 1876)
- Mesoleptus confusus (Forster, 1876)
- Mesoleptus congener (Forster, 1876)
- Mesoleptus contrarius (Forster, 1876)
- Mesoleptus cooperator (Forster, 1876)
- Mesoleptus coxalis (Habermehl, 1920)
- Mesoleptus cupidus (Forster, 1876)
- Mesoleptus curiosus (Forster, 1876)
- Mesoleptus cursitans (Forster, 1876)
- Mesoleptus davisii (Dalla Torre, 1902)
- Mesoleptus debilitatus (Forster, 1876)
- Mesoleptus deceptor (Forster, 1876)
- Mesoleptus declinans (Forster, 1876)
- Mesoleptus declivus (Provancher, 1886)
- Mesoleptus defectivus (Forster, 1876)
- Mesoleptus definitus (Forster, 1876)
- Mesoleptus delicatus (Forster, 1876)
- Mesoleptus derasus (Forster, 1876)
- Mesoleptus despectus (Forster, 1876)
- Mesoleptus devotus (Forster, 1876)
- Mesoleptus difformis (Forster, 1876)
- Mesoleptus diminutus (Forster, 1876)
- Mesoleptus distans (Forster, 1876)
- Mesoleptus distinctus (Forster, 1876)
- Mesoleptus egregius (Forster, 1876)
- Mesoleptus elaphrus (Forster, 1876)
- Mesoleptus elegantulus (Forster, 1876)
- Mesoleptus elongatus (Fonscolombe, 1852)
- Mesoleptus enodis (Forster, 1876)
- Mesoleptus erugatus (Forster, 1876)
- Mesoleptus evagator (Forster, 1876)
- Mesoleptus evanescens Ratzeburg, 1852
- Mesoleptus exaequatus (Forster, 1876)
- Mesoleptus exhaustorius (Forster, 1876)
- Mesoleptus exiguus (Forster, 1876)
- Mesoleptus exstinctus (Forster, 1876)
- Mesoleptus exstirpator (Forster, 1876)
- Mesoleptus exstirpatus Brues, 1910
- Mesoleptus fallax (Forster, 1876)
- Mesoleptus fasciatus Provancher, 1885
- Mesoleptus filicornis (Thomson, 1884)
- Mesoleptus filiventris (Forster, 1876)
- Mesoleptus flexibilis (Forster, 1876)
- Mesoleptus foveolatus (Forster, 1876)
- Mesoleptus fractus (Forster, 1876)
- Mesoleptus fulvipes Gravenhorst, 1829
- Mesoleptus fundatus (Forster, 1876)
- Mesoleptus futilis (Forster, 1876)
- Mesoleptus gallicus (Forster, 1876)
- Mesoleptus gemellus (Forster, 1876)
- Mesoleptus genitor (Forster, 1876)
- Mesoleptus genuinus (Forster, 1876)
- Mesoleptus glabriculus (Forster, 1876)
- Mesoleptus glaucus (Davis, 1898)
- Mesoleptus gracilis (Forster, 1876)
- Mesoleptus gracillimus (Habermehl, 1920)
- Mesoleptus gratiosus (Forster, 1876)
- Mesoleptus gravabilis (Forster, 1876)
- Mesoleptus homologus (Forster, 1876)
- Mesoleptus hospitans (Forster, 1876)
- Mesoleptus humilis (Forster, 1876)
- Mesoleptus hypoleptus (Forster, 1876)
- Mesoleptus ignotus Cresson, 1868
- Mesoleptus impotens (Forster, 1876)
- Mesoleptus incitus (Forster, 1876)
- Mesoleptus inclinator Schiodte, 1839
- Mesoleptus incolumis (Forster, 1876)
- Mesoleptus incompletus (Provancher, 1886)
- Mesoleptus ineditus (Forster, 1876)
- Mesoleptus infestus (Forster, 1876)
- Mesoleptus infirmus (Forster, 1876)
- Mesoleptus infligens (Forster, 1876)
- Mesoleptus intermedius (Forster, 1876)
- Mesoleptus intermixtus (Forster, 1876)
- Mesoleptus internecivus (Forster, 1876)
- Mesoleptus invalidus (Forster, 1876)
- Mesoleptus invidiosus (Forster, 1876)
- Mesoleptus invitus (Forster, 1876)
- Mesoleptus jucundus (Forster, 1876)
- Mesoleptus juvenilis (Forster, 1876)
- Mesoleptus labilis (Forster, 1876)
- Mesoleptus laevigatus (Gravenhorst, 1820)
- Mesoleptus lateralis Schiodte, 1839
- Mesoleptus laticinctus (Walker, 1874)
- Mesoleptus lepidus (Forster, 1876)
- Mesoleptus leptodomus (Forster, 1876)
- Mesoleptus leptogaster (Forster, 1876)
- Mesoleptus leucostomus Gravenhorst, 1829
- Mesoleptus levis (Forster, 1876)
- Mesoleptus limitaris (Forster, 1876)
- Mesoleptus marginatus (Thomson, 1884)
- Mesoleptus maurus Gravenhorst, 1829
- Mesoleptus melanocerus (Forster, 1876)
- Mesoleptus melanurus (Forster, 1876)
- Mesoleptus mesomeristus (Forster, 1876)
- Mesoleptus mirabilis Stephens, 1835
- Mesoleptus mitis (Forster, 1876)
- Mesoleptus molestus (Forster, 1876)
- Mesoleptus navus (Forster, 1876)
- Mesoleptus nefastus (Forster, 1876)
- Mesoleptus neglectus (Forster, 1876)
- Mesoleptus nemophilus (Forster, 1876)
- Mesoleptus nitidulus (Forster, 1876)
- Mesoleptus nosophorus (Forster, 1876)
- Mesoleptus novellus (Forster, 1876)
- Mesoleptus obscurellus (Forster, 1876)
- Mesoleptus occultus (Forster, 1876)
- Mesoleptus oligomerus (Forster, 1876)
- Mesoleptus olistherus (Forster, 1876)
- Mesoleptus onerosus (Forster, 1876)
- Mesoleptus optabilis (Forster, 1876)
- Mesoleptus opulentus (Smits van Burgst, 1913)
- Mesoleptus palpator Schiodte, 1839
- Mesoleptus percussor (Forster, 1876)
- Mesoleptus perditorius (Forster, 1876)
- Mesoleptus peregrinus (Forster, 1876)
- Mesoleptus petiolaris (Thomson, 1884)
- Mesoleptus pontresinensis (Forster, 1876)
- Mesoleptus pravus (Forster, 1876)
- Mesoleptus prolixus Schiodte, 1839
- Mesoleptus pronus (Forster, 1876)
- Mesoleptus propinquus (Forster, 1876)
- Mesoleptus propugnator (Forster, 1876)
- Mesoleptus punctiger (Forster, 1876)
- Mesoleptus purus (Forster, 1876)
- Mesoleptus quadrituberculatus (Forster, 1876)
- Mesoleptus quietus (Forster, 1876)
- Mesoleptus raptor (Forster, 1876)
- Mesoleptus reclinator Schiodte, 1839
- Mesoleptus remotus (Forster, 1876)
- Mesoleptus renitens (Forster, 1876)
- Mesoleptus requirens (Forster, 1876)
- Mesoleptus retractus (Forster, 1876)
- Mesoleptus ripicola (Thomson, 1884)
- Mesoleptus ruficoxatus (Forster, 1876)
- Mesoleptus rufipes (Forster, 1876)
- Mesoleptus rufiventris (Smits van Burgst, 1913)
- Mesoleptus sapporensis (Uchida, 1930)
- Mesoleptus scrutator (Haliday, 1838)
- Mesoleptus seductorius (Forster, 1876)
- Mesoleptus segregatus (Forster, 1876)
- Mesoleptus semiflavus Nees, 1830
- Mesoleptus signatus (Forster, 1876)
- Mesoleptus silesiacus (Forster, 1876)
- Mesoleptus similatorius (Forster, 1876)
- Mesoleptus singularis (Forster, 1876)
- Mesoleptus sobrius (Forster, 1876)
- Mesoleptus solitarius (Forster, 1876)
- Mesoleptus sollicitus (Forster, 1876)
- Mesoleptus speciosus Curtis, 1837
- Mesoleptus speculum (Forster, 1876)
- Mesoleptus spoliator (Forster, 1876)
- Mesoleptus subcompressus Gravenhorst, 1829
- Mesoleptus subdentatus (Forster, 1876)
- Mesoleptus subimpressus (Forster, 1876)
- Mesoleptus subrugosus (Forster, 1876)
- Mesoleptus subsulcatus (Forster, 1876)
- Mesoleptus subtilis (Forster, 1876)
- Mesoleptus taeniolatus (Forster, 1876)
- Mesoleptus tenellus (Forster, 1876)
- Mesoleptus tenuiventris (Forster, 1876)
- Mesoleptus tobiasi Jonaitis, 2004
- Mesoleptus transversor (Thunberg, 1822)
- Mesoleptus trepidus (Forster, 1876)
- Mesoleptus tribulator (Forster, 1876)
- Mesoleptus trifoveolatus (Forster, 1876)
- Mesoleptus tripunctus (Forster, 1876)
- Mesoleptus unipunctus (Forster, 1876)
- Mesoleptus unitus (Forster, 1876)
- Mesoleptus vacuus (Forster, 1876)
- Mesoleptus vetustus (Forster, 1876)
- Mesoleptus vicinus (Forster, 1876)
- Mesoleptus vigilatorius (Forster, 1876)
- Mesoleptus vilis (Forster, 1876)
- Mesoleptus volubilis (Forster, 1876)
