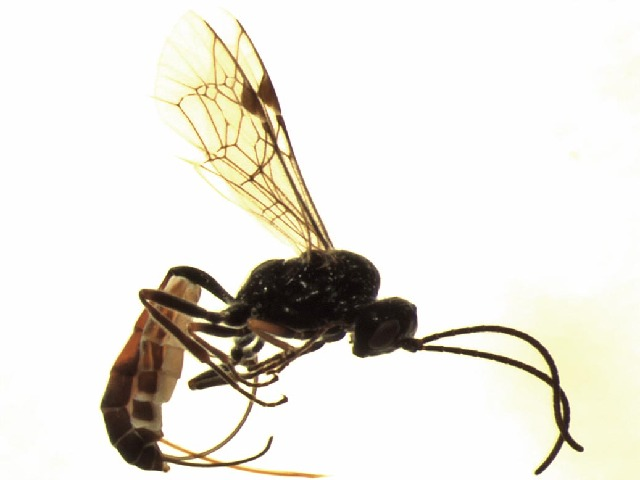
- Bathythrix longiceps

Scientific classification
- Kingdom: Animalia
- Phylum: Arthropoda
- Class: Insecta
- Order: Hymenoptera
- Family: Ichneumonidae
- Subfamily: Phygadeuontinae
- Tribe: Phygadeuontini
- Genus: Bathythrix; Förster, 1868

Synonyms
- Agenora Cameron, 1909; Gausocentrus Förster, 1868; Ischnurgops Förster, 1868; Leptocryptus Thomson, 1873; Panargyrops Förster, 1868; Steganops Förster, 1868; Stenoschema Förster, 1868

= Bathythrix =

Genus of wasps

Bathythrix is a genus of ichneumon wasps in the family Ichneumonidae. There are at least 60 described species in Bathythrix.

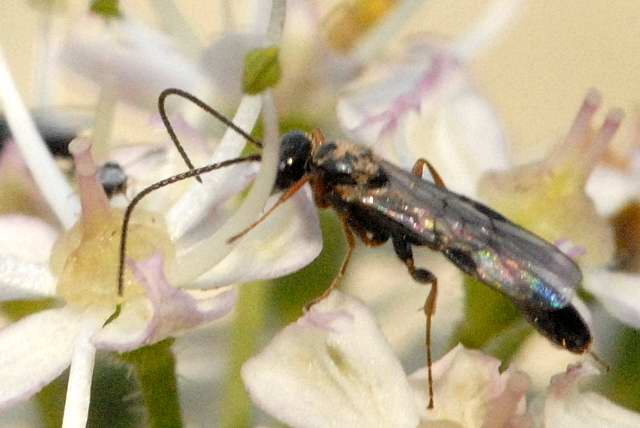
Bathythrix pellucidator

== Species ==
These 60 species belong to the genus Bathythrix:

- Bathythrix aerea (Gravenhorst, 1829)
- Bathythrix alter (Kerrich, 1942)
- Bathythrix anaulax Townes, 1983
- Bathythrix areolaris (Cushman, 1939)
- Bathythrix argentata (Gravenhorst, 1829)
- Bathythrix carinata (Seyrig, 1952)
- Bathythrix cilifacialis Sheng, 1998
- Bathythrix claviger (Taschenberg, 1865)
- Bathythrix collaris (Thomson, 1896)
- Bathythrix crassa Townes, 1983
- Bathythrix decipiens (Gravenhorst, 1829)
- Bathythrix eurypyga Townes, 1983
- Bathythrix formosa (Desvignes, 1860)
- Bathythrix fragilis (Viereck, 1903)
- Bathythrix gyrinophaga (Cushman, 1930)
- Bathythrix gyrinophagus (Cushman, 1930)
- Bathythrix hirticeps (Cameron, 1909)
- Bathythrix illustris Sawoniewicz, 1980
- Bathythrix ithacae Townes, 1983
- Bathythrix kuwanae Viereck, 1912
- Bathythrix kuwanai Viereck
- Bathythrix lamina (Thomson, 1884)
- Bathythrix latifrons (Cushman, 1939)
- Bathythrix linearis (Gravenhorst, 1829)
- Bathythrix longiceps Townes, 1983
- Bathythrix maculata (Hellen, 1957)
- Bathythrix margaretae Sawoniewicz, 1980
- Bathythrix medialis Townes, 1983
- Bathythrix meteori Howard, 1897
- Bathythrix montana (Schmiedeknecht, 1905)
- Bathythrix narangae (Uchida, 1930)
- Bathythrix nigripalpis Townes, 1983
- Bathythrix pacifica (Cushman, 1920)
- Bathythrix pellucidator (Gravenhorst, 1829)
- Bathythrix peregrina (Cresson, 1868)
- Bathythrix pilosa (Uchida, 1932)
- Bathythrix pimplae Howard, 1897
- Bathythrix pleuralis Sawoniewicz, 1980
- Bathythrix praestans (Seyrig, 1952)
- Bathythrix prominens (Strobl, 1901)
- Bathythrix prothorax Momoi, 1970
- Bathythrix quadrata (Seyrig, 1952)
- Bathythrix rugulosa (Thomson, 1884)
- Bathythrix sericea (Provancher, 1875)
- Bathythrix sericeifrons (Provancher, 1879)
- Bathythrix sparsa Townes, 1983
- Bathythrix spatulator Aubert, 1964
- Bathythrix speculator (Seyrig, 1935)
- Bathythrix spheginus (Gravenhorst, 1829)
- Bathythrix striatus Ashmead
- Bathythrix strigosa (Thomson, 1884)
- Bathythrix subargentea (Cresson, 1864)
- Bathythrix tenuis (Gravenhorst, 1829)
- Bathythrix texana (Ashmead, 1890)
- Bathythrix thomsoni (Kerrich, 1942)
- Bathythrix triangularemaculata (Motschoulsky, 1863)
- Bathythrix triangularis (Cresson, 1868)
- Bathythrix triangulifera (Seyrig, 1952)
- Bathythrix vierecki Townes, 1983
- Bathythrix zonata Townes, 1983
