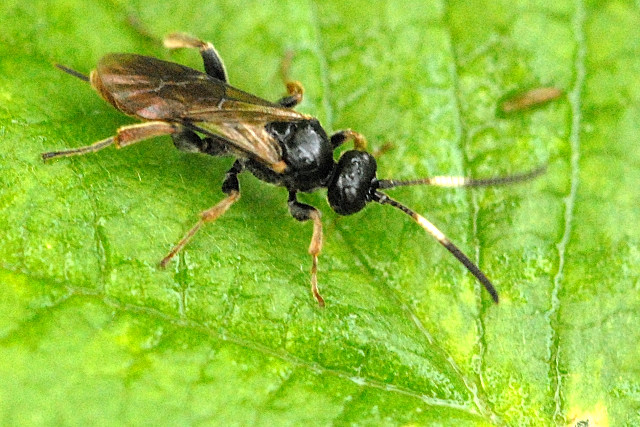
- Endasys parviventris

Scientific classification
- Kingdom: Animalia
- Phylum: Arthropoda
- Clade: Pancrustacea
- Class: Insecta
- Order: Hymenoptera
- Family: Ichneumonidae
- Subfamily: Phygadeuontinae
- Tribe: Phygadeuontini
- Subtribe: Endaseina
- Genus: Endasys; Förster, 1868

Diversity
- at least 120 species

= Endasys =

Genus of wasps

Endasys is a genus of ichneumon wasps in the family Ichneumonidae. There are more than 120 described species in Endasys.

== See also ==
- List of Endasys species
