= Rhembobius =

Scientific classification
- Domain: Eukaryota
- Kingdom: Animalia
- Phylum: Arthropoda
- Class: Insecta
- Order: Hymenoptera
- Family: Ichneumonidae
- Genus: Rhembobius; Förster, 1869

Genus of insects

Rhembobius is a genus of parasitoid wasps belonging to the family Ichneumonidae. They are parasitoids of pupal stage Syrphidae.

The species of this genus are found in Europe.

Species:

- Rhembobius bifrons (Gmelin, 1790)
- Rhembobius bischoffi (Statz, 1936)
- Rhembobius perscrutator (Thunberg, 1824)
- Rhembobius quadrispinus (Gravenhörst, 1829)
