= Stilpnus (wasp) =

Scientific classification
- Domain: Eukaryota
- Kingdom: Animalia
- Phylum: Arthropoda
- Class: Insecta
- Order: Hymenoptera
- Family: Ichneumonidae
- Tribe: Phygadeuontini
- Genus: Stilpnus; Gravenhorst, 1829

Genus of insects

Stilpnus is a genus of parasitoid wasps belonging to the family Ichneumonidae.

The species of this genus are found in Europe and North America.

Species:

- Stilpnus adanaensis Kolarov & Beyarslan, 1994
- Stilpnus analogus Forster, 1876
