= Megacara =

Scientific classification
- Domain: Eukaryota
- Kingdom: Animalia
- Phylum: Arthropoda
- Class: Insecta
- Order: Hymenoptera
- Family: Ichneumonidae
- Genus: Megacara; Townes, 1970

Genus of insects

Megacara is a genus of parasitoid wasps belonging to the family Ichneumonidae. The species of this genus are found in Europe and Northern America.

== Species ==
Megacara includes the following species:

- Megacara abdominalis Sheng, 2000
- Megacara hortulana (Gravenhorst, 1829)
