= Xiphulcus =

Scientific classification
- Kingdom: Animalia
- Phylum: Arthropoda
- Class: Insecta
- Order: Hymenoptera
- Family: Ichneumonidae
- Genus: Xiphulcus; Townes, 1970

Genus of insects

Xiphulcus is a genus of parasitoid wasps belonging to the family Ichneumonidae.

The species of this genus are found in Europe.

Species:

- Xiphulcus additor Aubert, 1977
- Xiphulcus constrictus (Thomson, 1884)
