= Paleobiota of the London Clay =

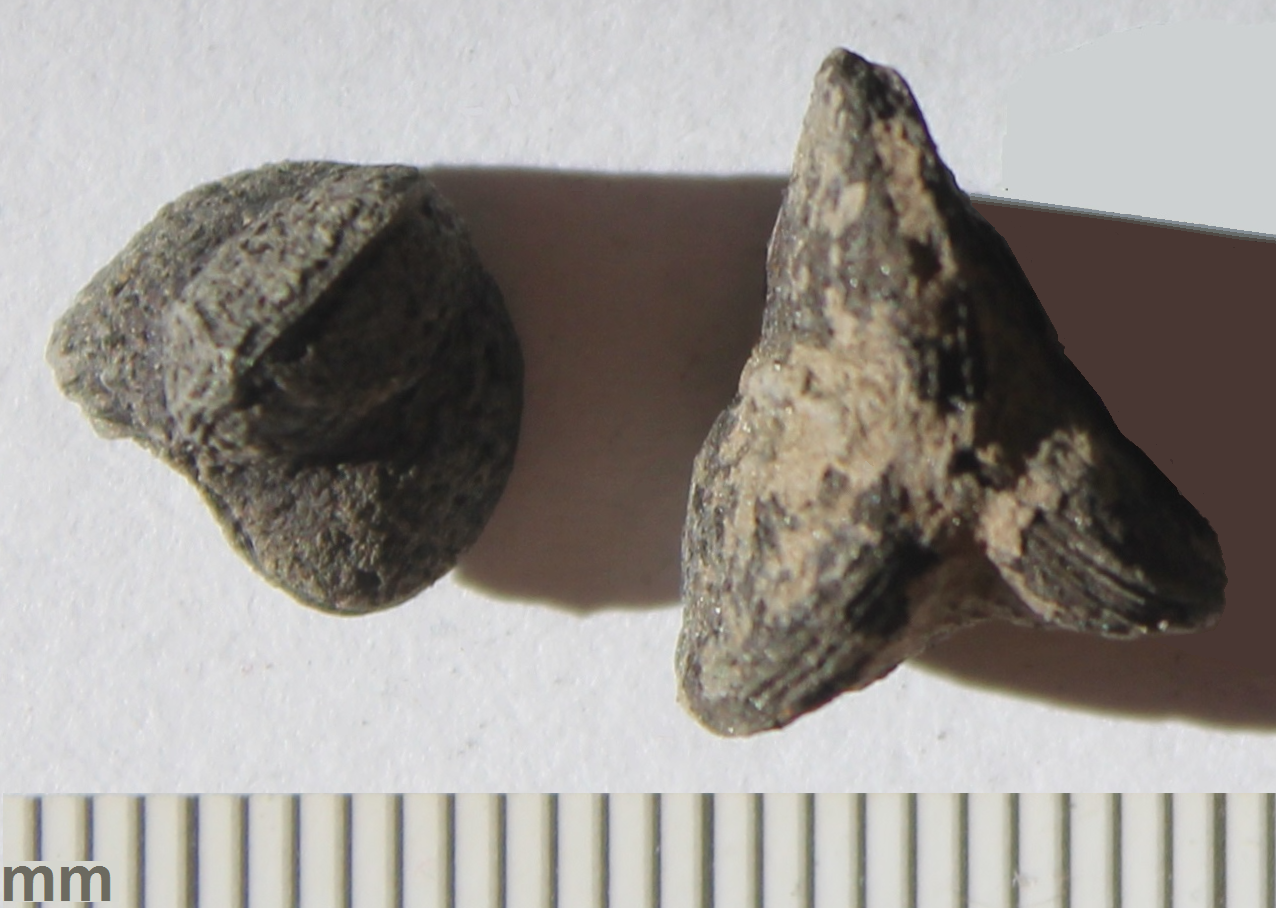
Fossil seed capsules of the genus Euphorbia, found in London Clay

A list of prehistoric and extant species whose fossils have been found in the London Clay, which underlies large areas of southeast England.

Plant fossils, especially seeds and fruits, are found in abundance and have been collected from the London Clay for almost 300 years. Some 350 named species of plant have been found, making the London Clay flora one of the world's most diverse for fossil seeds and fruits. The flora includes plant types found today in tropical forests of Asia and demonstrates the much warmer climate of the Eocene epoch, with plants such as Nypa (Nipah palms) and other palms being frequently encountered. The following plants list is incomplete and is based on the research by Marjorie Chandler. and research works done by the paleobotanist Steven R. Manchester and by professor of plant palaeobiology Margaret Collinson.

== Plants ==
=== Pteridophytes ===
- Pteridaceae

- Acrostichum – mangrove fern
- Pteris sp. - brake
- Vittaria sp. – shoestring fern, similar to Vittaria lineata

- Cyatheaceae – scaly tree fern

- Cyathea sp. – similar to Cyathea delgadii

- Thyrsopteridaceae

- Thyrsopteris sp. – similar to Thyrsopteris elegans

- Osmundaceae

- Osmunda sp. – similar to Osmunda javanica

- Dryopteridaceae – wood fern, male fern

- Dryopteris sp.

- Athyriaceae

- Diplazium sp. - similar to Diplazium smithianum

- Onocleaceae

- Onoclea sp. – similar to Onoclea sensibilis (the sensitive fern)

- Nephrolepidaceae – macho ferns

- Nephrolepis sp.

- Salviniaceae – water ferns

- Azolla

- Marsilea – water clover

- Marsilea sp. - similar to Marsilea quadrifolia

=== Lycopodiophytes ===
- Lycopodiaceae – clubmosses

- Lycopodium sp.
- Phylloglossum sp. – similar to Phylloglossum drummondii (pygmy clubmoss)

=== Gymnosperms ===
- Ginkgoaceae

- Ginkgo sp.

- Cycadaceae

- Cycas sp. - similar to Cycas schumanniana

- Zamiaceae

- Zamia sp. – similar to Zamia pumila

- Araucariaceae – monkey puzzle, bunya pine, and Norfolk pine

- Agathis sp. - similar to Agathis dammara
- †Araucarites spp.
- †Doliostrobus stenbergi - fossils in the past named †Araucarites are said to be of this genus, it is now placed in its own family, †Doliostrobaceae.

- Pinaceae

- Pinus spp.

- Taxaceae

- ?Taxaceae indet.
- †Cephalotaxus bowerbanki – plum yew
- Torreya sp.

- Cupressaceae

- †Callitris curta (Callitrites curta) – cypress pine
- †Cupressinites spp.
- Libocedrus adpressa
- †Quasisequoia couttsiae
- Sequoia sp
- Sequoiadendron fordi
- Widdringtonia sp. – African cypresses

- Podocarpaceae

- Afrocarpus sp. – similar to Afrocarpus falcatus (common yellowwood)
- Podocarpus argillaelondinensis?
- Podocarpus sp. – similar to Podocarpus elatus (plum pine)
- Podocarpus sp. – similar to Podocarpus novae-caledoniae
- Podocarpus sp. – similar to Podocarpus nubigenus (Chilean podocarp, cloud podocarp)
- Prumnopitys sp. – similar to Prumnopitys andina (the Chilean plum yew)

=== Angiosperms ===
- Arecaceae – palms

- †Caryotispermum cantiense
- Corypha sp.
- Livistona minima
- Nypa burtini (syn. Nipa burtini)
- Oncosperma anglica
- †Palmospermum bracknellense
- †Palmospermum cooperi
- †Palmospermum davisi
- †Palmospermum elegans
- †Palmospermum jenkinsi
- †Palmospermum minutum
- †Palmospermum ornatum
- †Palmospermum ovale
- †Palmospermum subglobulare
- Sabal grandisperma
- Serenoa sp.
- ?Trachycarpus sp.

- Cyclanthaceae

- Cyclanthus lakensis

- Cyperaceae - sedges

- †Caricoidea obovata
- †Polycarpella caespitosa

- Posidoniaceae - seagrass family

- Posidonia parisiensis

- Nymphaeaceae – water lilies

- †Protobarclaya eocenica
- Victoria sp - similar to Victoria cruziana

- Magnoliaceae

- Liriodendron gardneri - tulip tree
- Magnolia angusta
- Magnolia crassa
- Magnolia davisi
- Magnolia lata
- Magnolia lobata
- Magnolia oblonga
- Magnolia pygmaea
- Magnolia rugosa
- Magnolia subquadrangularis
- Magnolia symmetrica

- Myristicaceae - nutmeg family

- †Myristicacarpum chandlerae

- Annonaceae - the custard apple family

- Alphonsea sp.
- †Anonaspermum anonijorme - related to the genera Anonna and Polyalthia, most similar species is Annona muricata
- †Anonaspermum cerebellatum - Uvaria, Melodorum and Orophea shows closest resemblance to the fossil
- †Anonaspermum commune
- †Anonaspermum complanatum - related to Anonna and Melodorum
- †Anonaspermum corrugatum - related to the genera Anonna and Melodorum
- †Anonaspermum minimum - related to Dasymaschalon clusiflorum
- †Anonaspermum obscurum
- †Anonaspermum ovale - related to the genera Anonna and Melodorum
- †Anonaspermum pulchrum - related to Dasymaschalon clusiflorum
- †Anonaspermum punctatum - related to the genera Bocagea, Orophea, Unonopsis, and Guatteria
- †Anonaspermum rotundatum - distantly related to Polyauhia
- †Anonaspermum rugosum
- †Anonaspermum subcompressum
- Asimina sp. - similar to Asimina reticulata
- Orophea sp.
- Polyalthia sp.
- Rollinia sp.
- Uvaria sp.

- Lauraceae – avocado and cinnamon family

- Beilschmiedia bognorensis
- Beilschmiedia eocenica
- Beilschmiedia gigantea
- Beilschmiedia oviformis
- Beilschmiedia pyriformis

- Cinnamomum grande
- Cinnamomum globulare
- Cinnamomum oblongum
- Cinnamomum ovoideum

- †Crowella globosa

- Endiandra spp.

- †Laurocalyx bowerbanki
- †Laurocalyx dubius
- †Laurocalyx fibrotorulosus
- †Laurocalyx globularis
- †Laurocalyx magnus

- †Laurocarpum crassum
- †Laurocarpum cupuliferum
- †Laurocarpum davisi
- †Laurocarpum inornatum
- †Laurocarpum minimum
- †Laurocarpum minutissimum
- †Laurocarpum ovoideum
- †Laurocarpum paradoxum
- †Laurocarpum proteum
- †Laurocarpum pyrocarpum
- †Laurocarpum sheppeyense

- Litsea pyriformis

- Ocotea sp.

- †Protoaltingia europaea

- †Protoravensara sheppeyensis

- Aristolochiaceae - birthwort family

- Aristolochia sp.

- Schisandraceae

- Illicium sp. - similar to Illicium floridanum

- Dilleniaceae

- Hibbertia bognorensis
- Tetracera? cantiensis
- Tetracera crofti
- Tetracera eocenica

- Platanaceae – sycamore or plane tree

- †Plataninium decipiens

- Proteaceae

- Dryandra acutiloba

- Fagaceae – beech, oak and chestnut family

- †Quercinium pasanioides

- Betulaceae – birch, alder and hornbeams

- Alnus richardsoni (syn. Petrophiloides richardsoni) – an alder

- Ticodendraceae

- †Ferrignocarpus bivalvis

- Myricaceae - wax-myrtle, bayberry family

- Myrica boveyana

- Juglandaceae – walnut, hickory and pecan family

- †Juglandicarya bognorensis
- †Juglandicarya cooperi
- †Juglandicarya depressa - the most common Juglandacarya species in the London Clay
- †Juglandicarya lubbocki
- †Juglandicarya minuta
- †Petrophiloides richardsoni - among the two most abundant Juglandaceae species in the London Clay
- †Pterocaryopsis bognorensis - related to the genus Pterocarya

- Trochodendraceae

- Trochodendron pauciseminum

- Haloragaceae

- †Haloragicarya sp.

- Sabiaceae

- †Bognoria venablesi
- Meliosma cantiensis
- Meliosma jenkinsi
- Meliosma sheppeyensis

- Menispermaceae – moon seed family

- †Bowerbankella tiliacoroidea
- †Davisicarpum gibbosum
- Diploclisia bognorensis
- †Eohypserpa parsonsi
- †Frintonia ornata
- Hypserpa sp.
- Jatrorrhiza sp.
- †Menispermicarpum rariforme
- †Menispermoxylon - close to the extant genus Tinomiscium
- †Microtinomiscium foveolatum
- †Palaeococculus lakensis
- †Palaeosinomenium pulchrum
- †Tinomiscoidea scaphiformis
- Tinospora excavata
- †Wardenia davisi

- Cardiopteridaceae

- Citronella sp.

- Torricelliaceae

- Toricellia sp. - very similar to Torricellia bonesii from the Clarno Formation of Oregon

- Hamamelidaceae – witch-hazel family

- Corylopsis? bognorensis
- Corylopsis? latisperma
- Corylopsis venablesi
- †Jenkinsella sp.
- †Protoaltingia europaea

- Altingiaceae

- Altingia sp.
- Liquidambar palaeocenica - sweetgum

- Oleaceae

- Fraxinus sp.

- Styracaceae

- Styrax sp.

- Theaceae

- Camellia sp. - tea
- Gordonia sp.
- Stewartia sp.

- Pentaphylacaceae

- Eurya sp.

- Symplocaceae – sapphire-berry, sweet leaf.

- Symplocos curvata
- Symplocos quadrilocularis
- Symplocos trilocularis
- Symplocos bognorensis

- Ericaceae

- ?Leucopogon quadrilocularis
- Lissanthe sp.
- Rhododendron sp.

- Sapotaceae

- †Sapoticarpum rotundatum
- †Sapoticarpum latum
- †Sapoticarpum duhium
- †Sapotispermum sheppeyense - allied to Chrysophyllum and Sideroxylon

- Bataceae - saltwort or beachwort

- Batis sp. - similar to Batis maritima

- Myrtaceae

- †Hightea elliptica
- †Hightea turgida
- †Myrtospermum variabile
- †Palaeorhodomyrtus subangulata - allied to Rhodomyrtus

- Staphyleaceae

- ?Tapiscia sp. - bladdernut

- Fabaceae

- Acacia sp. – similar to Vachellia farnesiana
- Caesalpinia sp. - seed pods very similar to seed pods of C. claibornensis from the middle Eocene of Tennessee
- Dalbergia sp.
- †Leguminocarpon gardneri - seed pods most compatible to seed pods of species in Caesalpinia and Peltogyne
- †Leguminocarpon nervosum
- †Mimosites browniana

- Rosaceae

- Rubus sp.

- Elaeagnaceae

- Elaeagnus sp. - oleaster, silverberry

- Myrsinaceae

- Ardisia eocenica

- Rhizophoraceae - mangrove

- Ceriops sp.
- †Palaeobruguiera elongata
- †Palaeobruguiera lata

- Salicaceae

- Oncoba variabilis
- †Oncobella sp.
- † Saxifragispermum spinosissimum

- Linaceae

- †Decaplatyspermum bowerbanki
- †Wetherellia variahilis - related to Hugonia

- Nyctaginaceae - the four o'clock family

- Pisonia sp. - the birdcatcher tree

- Olacaceae

- Erythropalum europaeum - Only one extant species of this genus which is a scandent shrubs or liana
- Erythropalum jenkinsi
- Erythropalum turbinatum
- Olax depressa

- Lamiaceae

- Satureja sp.

- Boraginaceae

- Ehretia clausentia
- Ehretia ehretioides
- Heliotropium sp.

- Solanaceae

- †Cantisolanum daturoides
- Datura sp. - similar to Datura ferox
- Datura sp. - similar to Datura metel

- Apocynaceae - the dogbane family

- Allamanda sp.
- †Ochrosella ovalis
- †Ochrosoidea sheppeyensis

- Burseraceae - the incense tree family

- Boswellia sp.
- †Bursericarpum aldwickense
- †Bursericarpum bognorense
- †Bursericarpum ovale
- †Bursericarpum venablesi
- †Palaeobursera bognorensis
- †Protocommiphora europaea

- Anacardiaceae

- Choerospondias sheppeyensis
- Dracontomelon minimum
- Dracontomelon subglobosum
- Lannea europaea
- Lannea jenkinsi
- †Lobaticarpum variabile
- Mangifera sp. - mango
- Odina europaea
- Odina jenkinsi
- Odina subreniformis
- Poupartia sp.
- †Pseudosclerocarya subalata
- †Spondiaecarpon operculatum - according to several botanists, the pyritized specimens, originally described as Spondiaecarpon operculatum, represent locule casts of Torricellia sp.
- †Xylocarya sp.

- Onagraceae

- †Palaeeucharidium cellulare - allied to Eucharidium

- Lythraceae

- †Cranmeria trilocularis
- †Minsterocarpum alatum - closely related to the crape myrtle or crepe myrtle genus Lagerstroemia
- †Pachyspermum quinqueloculare
- †Tamesicarpum polyspermum

- Malvaceae

- †Cantitilia polysperma

- Elaeocarpaceae

- †Echinocarpus sheppeyensis

- Moraceae – mulberry and fig family

- Artocarpus sp. – breadfruit
- Ficus sp. – fig
- Maclura sp.
- ?Morus sp.

- Urticaceae

- †Urticicarpum scutellum

- Euphorbiaceae - the spurge family

- Aleurites sp.
- Croton sp.
- Euphorbia sp. – similar to Euphorbia cotinifolia
- †Euphorbiospermum bognorense
- †Euphorbiospermum cooperi
- †Euphorbiospermum eocenicum
- †Euphorbiospermum obliquum
- †Euphorbiospermum subglobulare
- †Euphorbiospermum subovoideum
- †Euphorbiospermum venablesi
- †Euphorbiotheca minima
- †Euphorbiotheca sheppeyensis
- †Lagenoidea bilocularis
- †Lagenoidea trilocularis

- Manihot sp. – cassava
- †Wetherellia variabilis

- Cucurbitaceae - the gourd family

- †Cucurbitospermum cooperi
- †Cucurbitospermum equiaelaterale
- †Cucurbitospermum sheppeyense
- †Cucurbitospermum triangulare

- Vitaceae

- Ampelopsis sp.
- †Palaeovitis sp.
- Tetrastigma corrugata
- Tetrastigma davisi
- Tetrastigma elliotti
- Tetrastigma sheppeyensis:*†Vitacexoylon sp. - close to the extant genus Rhoicissus
- Vitis bilobata
- Vitis bognorensis
- Vitis bracknellensis
- Vitis elegans
- Vitis longisulcata
- Vitis magnisperma
- Vitis obovoidea
- Vitis platyformis
- Vitis pygmaea
- Vitis rectisulcata
- Vitis semenlabruscoides
- Vitis subglobosa
- Vitis venablesi

- Sapindaceae – soapberry

- Atalaya sp. – similar to Atalaya variifolia from Australia
- †Cupanoides grandis - related to Cupania
- †Cupanoides tumidus - related to Cupania
- †Palaeallophylus minimus
- †Palaeallophyllus ovoideus
- †Palaeallophylus rotundatus
- †Palaealectryon spirale
- †Sapindospermum cooperi
- †Sapindospermum davisi
- †Sapindospermum grande
- †Sapindospermum jenkinsi
- †Sapindospermum ovoideum
- †Sapindospermum revolutum
- †Sapindospermum subovatum
- Toechima sp.

- Meliaceae - the mahogany family

- Cedrela sp.
- †Melicarya variabili
- Toona sulcata

- Rutaceae - the rue family

- †Canticarya gracilis
- †Canticarya ovalis
- †Canticarya sheppeyensis
- †Canticarya ventricosa
- †Caxtonia elongata
- †Caxtonia glandulosa
- †Caxtonia rutacaeformis
- †Citrispermum sheppeyense
- †Clausenispermum dubium
- †Eozanthoxylon glandulosum
- Euodia costata
- †Rutaspermum bognorense
- †Rutaspermum minimum
- †Shrubsolea jenkinsi
- †Zanthoxylon compression
- †Zanthoxylon bognorense

- Celastraceae - the staff vine or bittersweet family

- †Canticarpum celastroides
- Catha sp. – most similar to Catha edulis (Khat)
- †Cathispermum pulchrum
- †Celastrinoxylon ramunculiformis

- Sterculiaceae

- Dombeya sp.
- †Sphinxia ovalis

- Cornaceae

- †Beckettia mastixioides
- Cornus ettingshausenii
- †Dunstania ettinghauseni
- †Dunstania multilocularis
- †Langtonia bisulcata
- †Lanfrancia subglobosa
- Mastixia cantiensis
- Mastixia grandis
- Mastixia parva
- †Portnallia bognorensis
- †Portnallia sheppeyensis

- Nyssaceae - the tupelo family

- Nyssa bilocularis
- Nyssa cooperi
- †Palaeonyssa multilocularis

- Curtisiaceae

- Curtisia quadrilocularis

- Alangiaceae

- Alangium jenkinsi

- Icacinaceae

- †Faboidea crassicutis
- †Icacinicarya amygadaloidea
- †Icacinicarya bartonensis
- †Icacinicarya becktonensis
- †Icacinicarya bognorensis
- †Icacinicarya echinata
- †Icacinicarya elegans
- †Icacinicarya emarginata
- †Icacinicarya forbesii
- †Icacinicarya foveolata
- †Icacinicarya glabra
- †Icacinicarya inornata
- †Icacinicarya jenkinsi
- †Icacinicarya minima
- †Icacinicarya mucronata
- †Icacinicarya nodulifera
- †Icacinicarya ovalis
- †Icacinicarya ovoidea
- †Icacinicarya platycarpa
- †Icacinicarya pygmaea
- †Icacinicarya reticulata
- †Icacinicarya rotundata
- †Icacinicarya transversalis
- Iodes acutiform
- Iodes bilinica
- Iodes corniculata
- Iodes davisii
- Iodes eocenica
- Iodes multireticulata
- Mappia sp.
- Miquelia sp.
- Natsiatum eocenicum
- †Palaeophytocrene ambigua
- †Palaeophytocrene foveolata
- †Perforatocarpum echinatum
- †Sphaeriodes ventricosa
- †Stizocarya communis

== Animals ==
Animal fossils include bivalves, gastropods, nautilus, worm tubes, brittle stars and starfish, crabs, lobsters, fish (including shark and ray teeth), reptiles (particularly turtles), and a large diversity of birds. A few mammal remains have also been recorded. Preservation varies; articulated skeletons are generally rare. Of fish, isolated teeth are very frequent. Bird bones are not infrequently encountered compared to other lagerstätten, but usually occur as single bones and are often broken.

The following fauna species list follows Clouter (2007).

=== Vertebrates ===
==== Mammals ====
- Argillotherium
- Coryphodon eocaenus – a pantodont
- Hyracotherium – a palaeothere, a primitive relative of modern horses
- Oxyaena – a creodont
- Platychoerops richardsoni - from Herne Bay, a primate belonging to the order Plesiadapiformes
- Melaneremia schrevei a primate belonging to the extinct family Omomyidae, related to living tarsiers

==== Birds ====
- Anatalavis oxfordi – a waterbird possibly related to the magpie-goose of Australia
- Archaeodromus - an archaeotrogonid
- Argillipes – perhaps a landfowl
- Coturnipes – a quail-like bird
- Danielsraptor – a masillaraptorid falconiform, closely related to Masillaraptor
- Dasornis – a pseudotooth bird
- Eocolius – a coliiform
- Eostrix – an owl
- Gastornis – from the Isle of Grain, a very large flightless galloansere
- Halcyornis – a parrot or roller relative
- Lithornis – a paleognath
- Lutavis – a possible afroavian
- Nasidytes – a loon
- Odontopteryx – a pseudotooth bird
- Parvigyps – perhaps a diurnal raptor
- Pediorallus – a paleognath or landfowl
- Percolinus – perhaps a landfowl
- "Precursor" – apparently a chimera of Charadriiformes and Psittaciformes (and possibly other) bones
- Primapus – a swift-like bird
- Primodroma – a tubenose, possibly a storm-petrel
- Promusophaga – a paleognath
- Prophaeton – a tropicbirds relative
- Proherodius – a waterbird
- Proplegadis – a stork or ibis
- Pseudodontornis – a pseudotooth bird
- Psittacomimus – a psittacopedid, closely related to Parapsittacopes
- Pulchrapollia – a parrot relative (Note: Includes "Primobucco" olsoni)
- Stintonornis – probably a hawk relative
- Tynskya – a messelasturid related to passerines and parrots
- Waltonavis – a possible leptosomiform
- Ypresiglaux – a basal strigiform

==== Reptiles ====
Crocodylians

- Diplocynodon – an alligatoroid
- Kentisuchus spenceri – a crocodylid

Snakes

- Palaeophis toliapicus and P. typhaeus

Turtles and tortoises

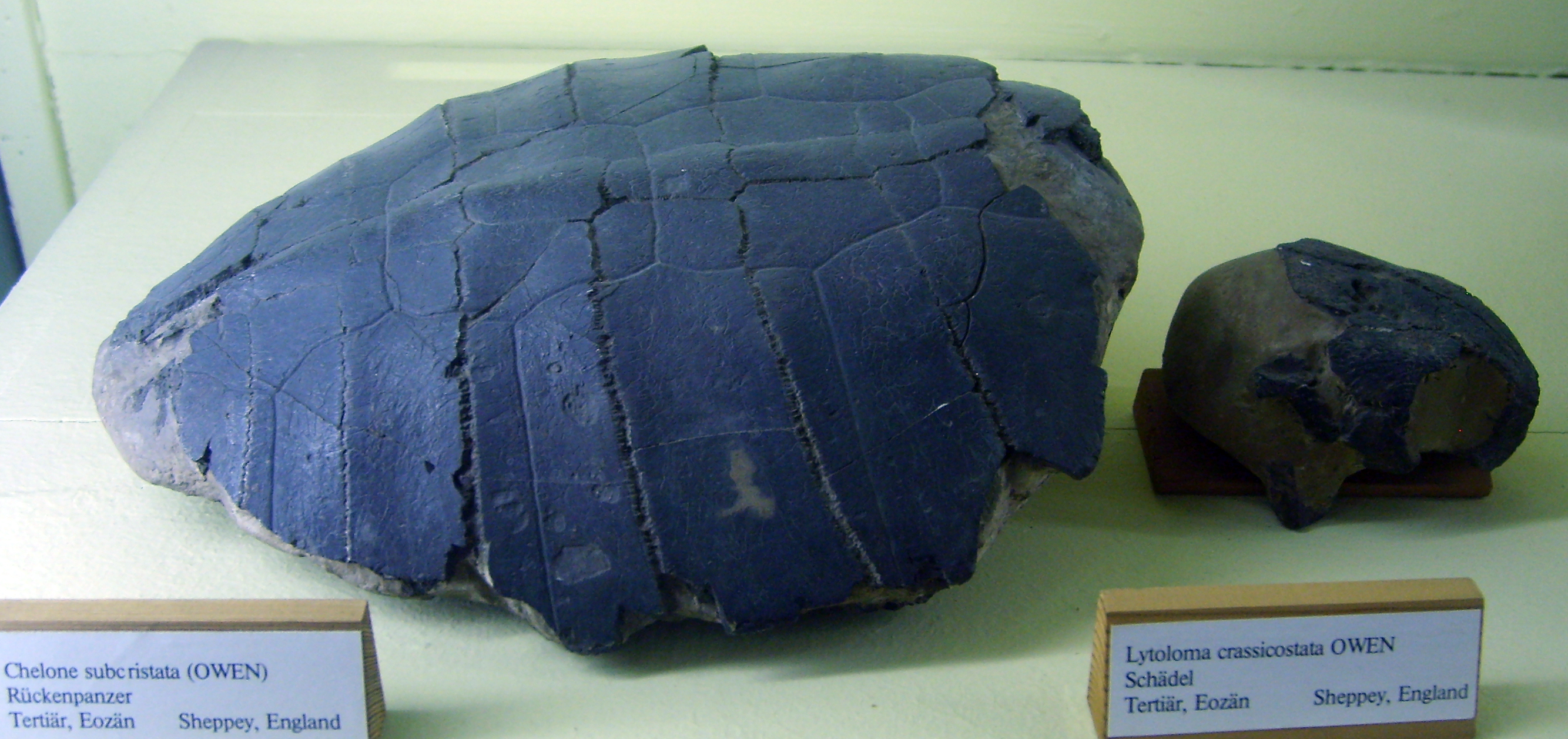
Turtle fossils from Sheppey

- Allaeochelys – a pig-nosed turtle
- Argillochelys, Eochelone, Puppigerus and "Thalassochelys" sp. – true sea-turtles
- Chrysemys bicarinata and C. testudiniformis – pond turtles
- Eosphargis – a leatherback sea-turtle
- Homopus comptoni – a tortoise
- Lytoloma crassicostatum and L. planimentum – prehistoric sea-turtles
- Palemys bowerbanki – a bothremydid
- Trionyx pustulatus and T. sp. – softshell turtles
- Dacochelys and Pseudotrionyx – incertae sedis

==== Bony fish ====
- Acestrus elongatus, A. ornatus, Aglyptorhynchus sulcatus, A. venablasi, Xiphiorhynchus parvus and X priscus – swordfish relatives
- Acipenser toliapicus – a true sturgeon
- Albula oweni – a bonefish
- Ampheristus toliapicus – a scorpionfish
- Ardiodus marriotti – incertae sedis
- Argillichthys toombsi – a lizardfish relative
- Aulopopsis depressifrons, A. egertoni and Labrophagus esocinus – flagfins
- Beerichthys ingens and B. sp. – Two species of luvar or luvar-like fish
- Bramoides brieni and Goniocranion arambourgi – pomfrets
- Brychaetus muelleri – an arowana
- Bucklandium diluvii – a naked catfish
- Cylindracanthus rectus and Hemirhabdorhynchus elliotti – Blochiidae
- Cymbium proosti, Eocoelopoma colei, E. curvatum, E. gigas, E. hopwoodi, Eothynnus salmoneus, Scombramphodon crassidens, S. sheppeyensis, Scombrinus macropomus, S. nuchalis, Sphyraenodus priscus, Tamesichthys decipiens, Wetherellus brevior, W. cristatus, W. longior and Woodwardella patellifrons – mackerel and tuna relatives
- Diodon sp. – a porcupinefish
- Egertonia isodonta and Phyllodus toliapicus – Phyllodontidae
- Elops sp., Esocelops cavifrons, Megalops oblongus, M. priscus, Promegalops sheppeyensis and P. signeuxae – ladyfish
- Enniskillenus radiatus – acanthomorph
- Eutrichurides winkleri – a cutlassfish
- Halecopsis insignis – Halecopsidae
- Laparon alticeps – spadefish
- Lehmanamia sheppeyensis – a bowfin
- Myripristis toliapicus, Naupygus bucklandi and Paraberyx bowerbanki – soldierfish
- Percostoma angustum, Plesioserranus cf. wemmeliensi and Serranopsis londinensis – groupers
- Podocephalus curryi, P. nitidus, Sciaenuropsis turneri and Sciaenurus bowerbanki – porgies
- Progempylus edwardsi – a snake mackerel
- Pseudosphaerodon antiquus and P. navicularis – wrasses?
- Pycnodus bowerbanki and P. toliapicus – Pychnodontidae
- Rhinocephalus planiceps and Trichurides sagittidens – hakes
- Rhynchorhinus branchialis and R. major – Eccelidae
- Tetratichthys antiquitatis – a jack mackerel
- Whitephippus tamensis – a lampriform

==== Cartilaginous fish ====
- Abdounia beaugi, Carcharhinus sp. (Note: Sometimes placed in Aprionodon) and Physogaleus secundus (Note: Sometimes placed in Physodon) – requiem sharks
- Aetobatis irregularis, Burnhamia daviesi, (Note: Sometimes placed in Rhinoptera) Myliobatis dixoni, M. latidens, M. raouxi and M. toliapicus – eagle rays
- Anomotodon sheppeyensis – a goblin shark
- Carcharias hopei, (Note: Sometimes called Hypotodus robustus) Jaekelotodus trigonalis, Odontaspis winkleri, Palaeohypotodus rutoti and Striatolamia macrota (Note: Sometimes called Eugomphodus macrotus) – sand sharks
- Edaphodon bucklandi and Elasmodus hunteri – chimaeras
- Dasyatis davisi and D. wochadunensis – stingrays
- Galeorhinus lefevrei, G. minor, G. recticonus, G. ypresiensis, Mustelus whitei and Triakis wardi – hound sharks
- Heterodontus vincenti, H. wardenensis and H. woodwardi – bullhead sharks
- Hexanchus agassizi, H. collinsonae, H. hookeri, Notorhynchus serratissimus and Weltonia burnhamensis – cow sharks
- Isisteus trituratus and Squalus minor (Note: Sometimes placed in Acanthius) – dogfish sharks
- Isurolamna affinis, Isurus nova, I. praecursor, Lamna inflata, L. lerichei, Otodus obliquus, O. aksuaticus and Xiphodolamia eocaena (Note: Sometimes placed in Xendolamia) – white sharks
- Megascyliorhinus cooperi, Scyliorhinus casieri, S. gilberti, S. pattersoni and S. woodwardi – catsharks
- Pararhincodon sp? – an indeterminate shark
- Raja sp.? – an indeterminate ray
- Squatina prima – an angel shark

=== Crustaceans ===
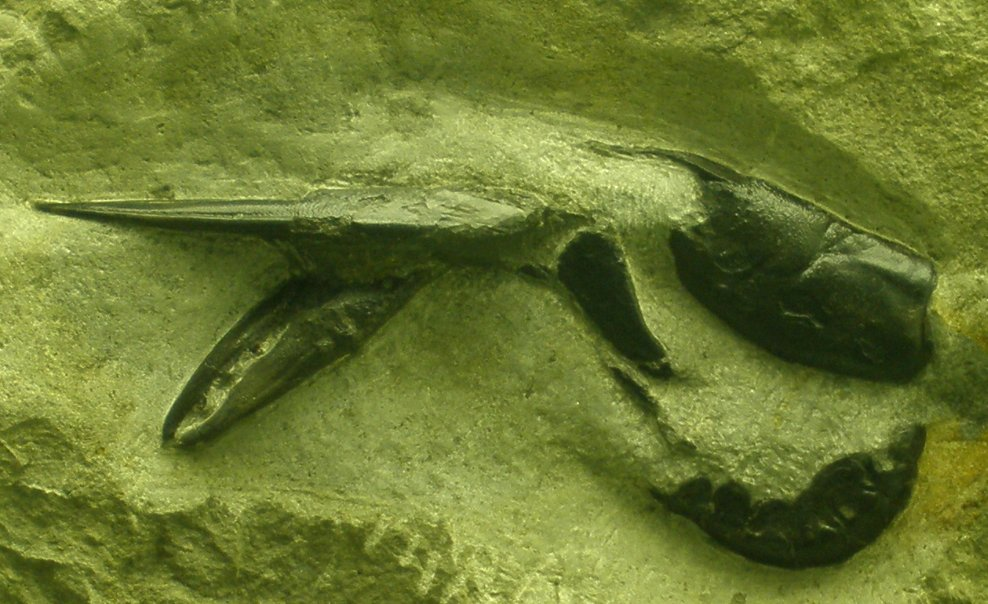
Exuvia of Hoploparia

- Lobsters and shrimp
  - Archiocarabus bowerbanki
  - Callianassa sp.
  - Homarus morrisi
  - Hoploparia gammaroides
  - Linuparus eocenicus & L. scyllariformis
  - Scyllarides tuberculatus
  - Scyllaridia koenigi
  - Thenops scyllariformis
- Barnacles
  - Arcoscapellum quadratum
  - Scalpellum minutum and S. quadratum
- Crabs
  - Basinotopus lamarckii Desmarest
  - Campylostoma mutatiforme
  - Cyclocorystes pulchellus (Note: Sometimes called Necrozius bowerbanki)
  - Dromilites bucklandi & D. lamarki
  - Glyphthyreus wetherelli
  - Goniochela angulata Desmarest
  - Harpactoxanthopsis cf. quadrilo
  - Mithracia libinioides
  - Oediosoma ambigua
  - Portunites incerta & P. stintoni
  - Xanthilites bowerbanki
  - Zanthopsis bispinosa, Z. dufori, Z. leachei, Z. nodosa and Z. unispinosa
- Mantis shrimp
  - Squilla wetherelli

=== Molluscs ===
==== Cephalopods ====
- Aturia ziczac, Cimomia imperialis, Deltoidonautilus sowerbyi, Euciphoceras regale, Eutrephoceras urbanum, Hercoglossa cassiniana and Simplicioceras centrale (Note: Sometimes placed in Eutrephoceras) – nautiluses
- Belopterina levesquei, Belosepia blainvillei and B. sepioidea – cuttlefish

==== Bivalves ====
- Abra splendens – Semelidae
- Amygdalum depressum (Note: Sometimes called Modiolus depressus) and Modiolus tubicola – Mytilidae

Anomiidae

- Anomia scabrosa – a jingle shell
- Enigmonia aenigmatica – a jingle shell
- Arca nitens, A. tumescens and Glycymeris wrigleyi (Note: Sometimes placed in Striarca) – ark clams
- Arctica planata (Note: Sometimes placed in Cyprina) – Arcticidae
- Astarte davisi, A. filigera and A. rugata (Note: Sometimes called A. rugatus) –

Astartidae

- Calpitaria sulcataria (Note: Sometimes called Pitaria tenuistriata) – a venus clam
- Corbula globosa – Corbulidae
- Cuspidaria inflata and C. lamallosa – Cuspidariidae
- Nuculana amygdaloides (Note: Sometimes placed in Ledina) and N. prisca – Nuculanidae
- Lentipecten corneus (Note: Sometimes called Amussium corneum) and Pecten sp. – scallops
- Nemocardium nitens (Note: Sometimes placed in Protocardium) and N. semigranulatum – Cardiidae
- Nucula consors – Nuculidae
- Ostrea sp. – a true oysters
- Pinna affinis – a pen shell
- Pleurolectroma media (Note: Sometimes placed in Pteria) and Pteria papyracea – pearl oysters
- Pycnodonte gryphovicina (Note: Sometimes placed in Ostrea) – Pycnodontidae
- Teredina personata and Teredo sp. – shipworms
- Thyasira angulata – Thyasiridae
- Thyasira goodhali – Thyasiridae
- Venericardia trinobantium – Carditidae
- Verticordia sulcata – Verticordiidae

==== Gastropods ====
- Acrilla cymaea, Foratiscala perforata, Litoriniscala scalaroides and Undiscala primaeva (Note: Sometimes considered a variety of Scala undosa) – wentletraps
- Aporrhais sowerbii (Note: Sometimes called A. sowerbyii) and Eotibia lucida (Note: Sometimes placed in Tibia) – true conchs
- Bathytoma granata, B. turbida, Clavatula conica, (Note: Sometimes in Hemipleurotoma) Cochlespira gyrata, Conolithus concinnus, (Note: Sometimes placed in Conospirus) Endiatoma cerithiformis, Fusiturris selysi, (Note: Sometimes in Hemipleurotoma) F. simillima, F. wetherelli, (Note: Sometimes in Hemipleurotoma) Gemmula koninckii, (Note: Sometimes in Hemipleurotoma) Hemipleurotoma fasciolata, H. prestwichi, Pseudotoma topleyi, Surculites errans, (Note: Sometimes S. bifaci or S. bifacsi) S. velatus, Turricula crassa, T. helix, T. latimarginata, (Note: Sometimes included in T. teretrium) T. nanodis, (Note: Sometimes included in T. teretrium) T. symmetrica and T. teretrium – Conoidea
- Bonellitia clathratum and B. laeviuscula – nutmeg shells
- Bullinella sp., Crenilabium elongatum, ?Roxiana sp., Scaphander ?parisiensis and Tornatellaea simulata – opisthobranchs
- Camptoceratops prisca, Spiratella mercinensis, S. taylori and S. tutelina – sea-butterflies
- Cassis striata and Mambrina gallica (Note: Sometimes placed in Galeodea) – tun shells
- Cepatia cepacea, Daphnobela juncea, Litiopa sulculosa, Orthochetus elongatus (Note: Sometimes called Newtoniella charlsworthi) and Stellaxis pulcher (Note: Sometimes called Solarium pulchrum) – incertae sedis
- Eocypraea oviformis – a cowrie
- Euspira glaucinoides (Note: Sometimes placed in Natica) and Sinum clathratum – moon snails
- Falsifusus londini, (Note: Sometimes called Fusinus unicarinatus) Fusinus coniferus, F. wetherelli, Pseudoneptunea curta, (Note: Sometimes placed in Bartonia) Siphonalia highgatensis, Streptolathyrus triliniatus, S. zonulatus, Wrigleya complanata (Note: Sometimes called Euthriofusus complanatus) and W. transversaria (Note: Sometimes called Euthriofusus transversarius) – true whelks
- Ficopsis multiformis (Note: Sometimes placed in Ficus) – a fig shell
- Lacunella sp. – a periwinkle
- Mathilda sororcula – Mathildidae
- Murex subcristatus and Paziella argillacea (Note: Sometimes called Murex argillaceus) – murex snails
- Pachysyrnola sp. and Turbonilla subterranea (Note: Sometimes called T. tenuiplica) – pyramid shells
- Patella sp. – Patellidae
- Ptychatractus aff. interuptus, Scaphella wetherelli (Note: Sometimes placed in Aurinia) and Volutospina nodosa – volutes
- Rilla cf. tenuistriata – Streptaxidae
- Ringicula turgida – Ringiculidae
- Sassia morrisi – a triton shell
- Sigapatella sp. (Note: Sometimes placed in Calyptraea) – Calyptraeidae
- Tornus sp. (Note: Sometimes placed in Adeorbis) and Turboella cf. misera – Rissoidae
- Xenophora extensum (Note: Sometimes called Onutusus extensa) – a carrier shell

==== Tusk shells ====
- Antalis anceps and A. nitens

=== Echinoderms ===
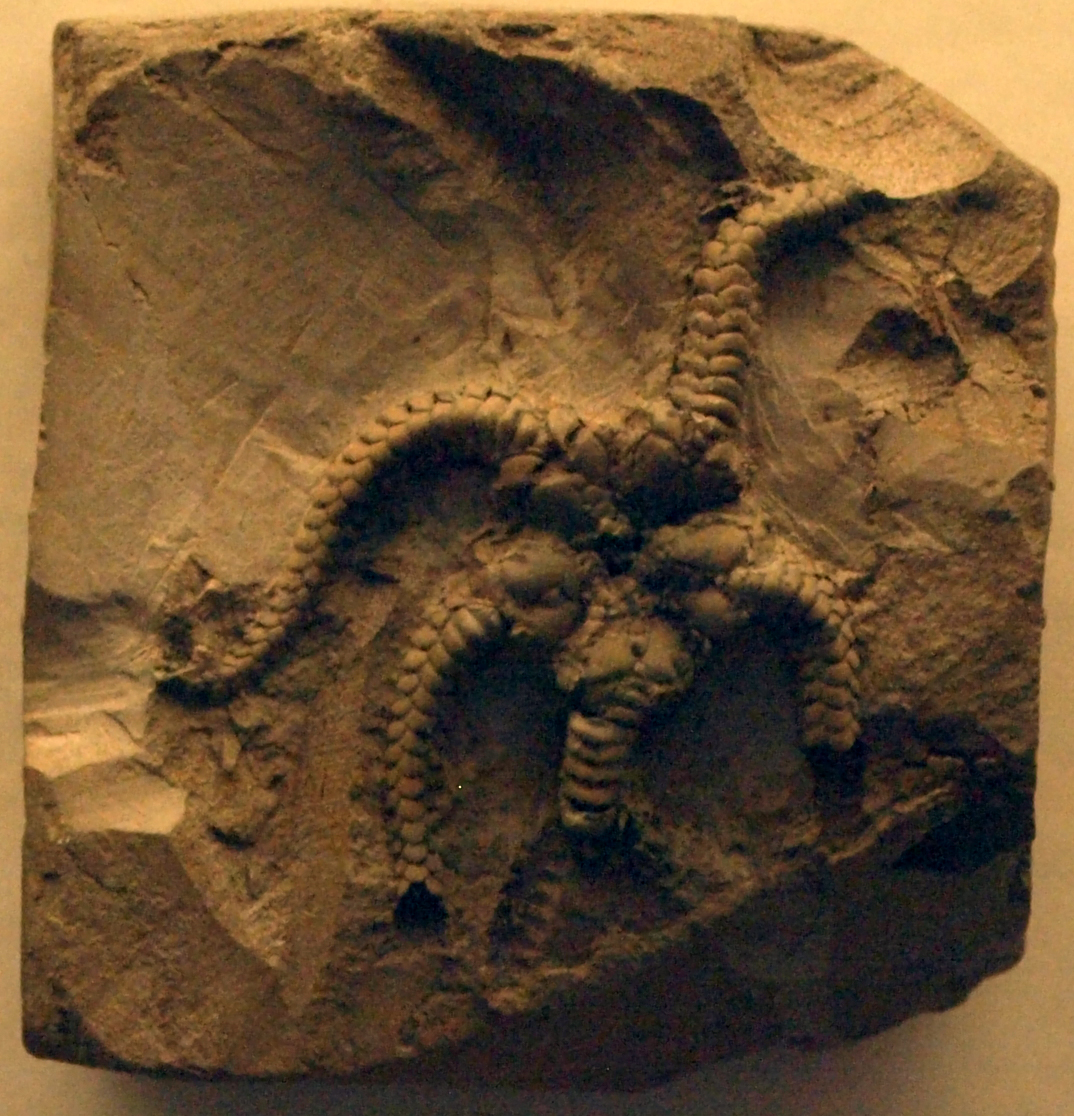
Ophiura wetherelli from the London Clay of Bognor Regis

- Asteropecten crispatus, Coulonia colei, Hemiaster bowerbanki, Hippasteria tuberculata, Ophioglypha wetherelli and Teichaster stokesii (Note: Sometimes placed in Asteropecten) – starfish
- Coelopleurus wetherelli, Micraster sp. and Schizaster sp. – sea urchins
- Democrinus londinensis (Note: Sometimes placed in Rhizochrinus) – crinoid
- ?Ophiacantha sp., Ophioglypha wetherelli, Ophiomusium sp. and Ophiura wetherelli – brittlestars

=== Annelids ===
- Rotularia bognoriensis
- Serpula trilineata

=== Cnidarians ===
- Paracyathus brevis and P. caryophyllus – corals
- Graphularia wetherelli – hydrozoan

=== Other invertebrates ===
- Adenellopsis wetherelli, Aimulosia sp., Batopora clithridiata, Beisselina sp., Cribrilina sp., Didymosella sp., Dittosaria wetherelli, Entalophora sp., Idmonia sp., Lunulites sp., Nellia sp., Pachythecella incisa, Vibracellina sp. and Websteria crissioides – bryozoans
- Hemiptera gen. et sp. indet. – true bug
- Lingula tenuis, Terebratulina striatula and T. wardenensis – lampshells
- Stelleta sp. – sponge

=== Ichnofossils ===
- Ditrupa plana – polychaete worm tubes?
- Scolithos
