= Ming (clam) =

World's oldest clam (c. 1498 or 1499–2006)

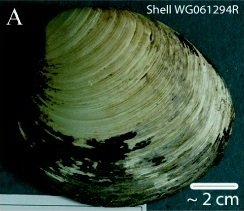
- Left valve of the shell, taken in 2006. The clam was 507 years old when captured.
- Other name: Hafrún
- Species: Arctica islandica (ocean quahog clam)
- Sex: Unknown
- Hatched: c. 1498 or 1499; Off the coast of the Crown Dependency of Iceland, Kingdom of Norway, Kalmar Union
- Died: 2006 (aged 507); Off the coast of Iceland
- Cause of death: Freezing
- Known for: Oldest individual animal ever discovered
- Named after: Ming dynasty, during which it was born

Ming (c. 1499 – 2006), also known as Hafrún, was an ocean quahog clam (Arctica islandica, family Arcticidae) that was dredged off the coast of Iceland in 2006 and whose age was calculated by counting annual growth lines in the shell. Ming was the oldest individual (non-clonal) animal ever discovered whose age could be precisely determined.

Initially thought to be 405 years old, Ming was later determined to be 507 years old, although it had previously been killed to make this determination. Its size was 87 mm × 73 mm (3.4 in × 2.9 in).

== Name ==
Ming's name was coined by Sunday Times journalists, in reference to the Ming dynasty in China, during which it was born. Later, the Icelandic researchers on the cruise which discovered the clam named it Hafrún, a woman's name that translates roughly as "the mystery of the ocean", taken from haf, 'ocean', and rún, 'mystery'. Ming's sex is unknown, as its reproductive state was recorded as "spent".

== Discovery ==
Ming was dredged off the northern coast of Iceland in 2006. In 2007, on the basis of counting the annual growth bands on the cross-sectional surface of the hinge region of the shell, researchers announced that it was 405 years old. The research was carried out by researchers from Bangor University. In the process, Ming died.

Professor Richardson said that the existence of such long-lived species could help scientists discover how some animals reach such advanced ages. Ming died in 2006 when it was frozen by researchers who were unaware of its exceptional age.

== Revision of age ==
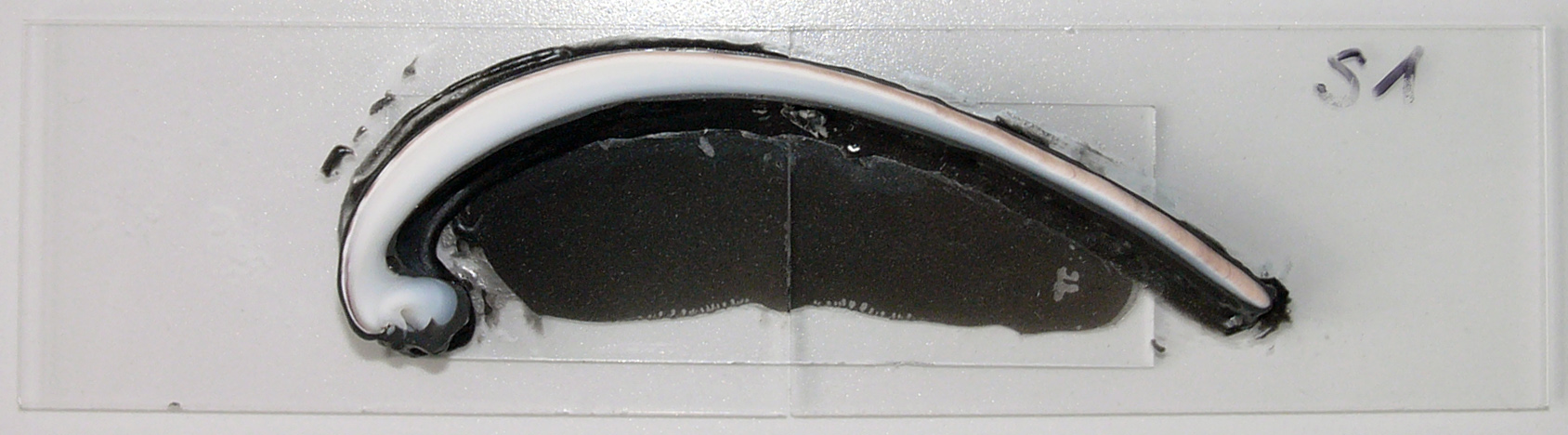
The clam must be killed to determine its age. A cross section is cut through the shell and bands revealed in this way can be counted using a variety of techniques.

In 2013, another assessment of Ming's age was carried out, counting bands which were measured on the sectioned surface of the outer shell margin. This was verified by comparing the banding patterns with those on other shells that were alive at the same time; this confirmed that Ming was 507 years old when it was caught. The revised age estimate is also supported by carbon-14 dating; marine biologist Rob Witbaard commented that he considers this second assessment accurate to within 1–2 years.

== See also ==
- Prometheus (tree)
- List of long-living organisms
