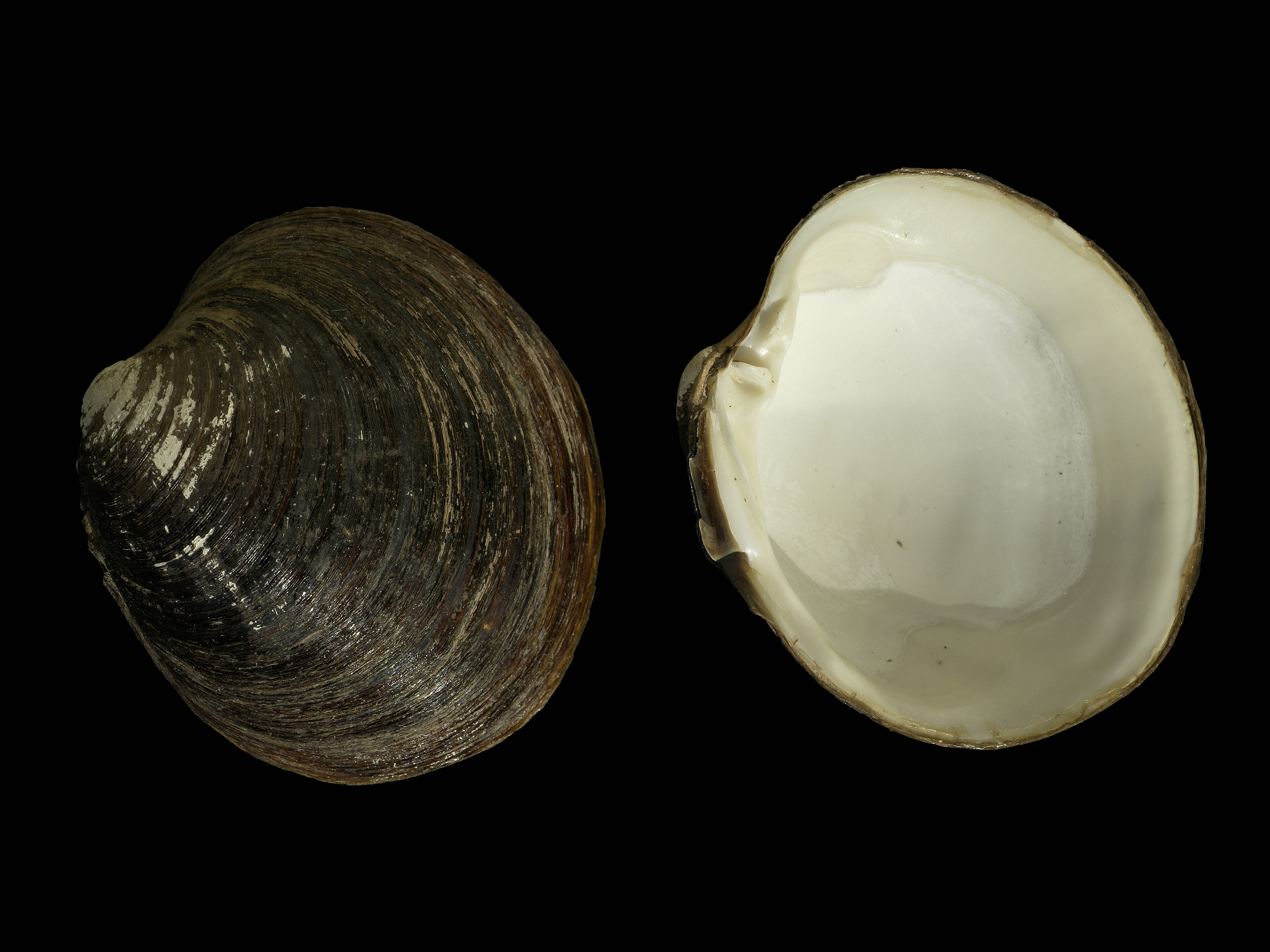
- A shell of Arctica islandica with the valves separated

Scientific classification
- Kingdom: Animalia
- Phylum: Mollusca
- Class: Bivalvia
- Order: Venerida
- Superfamily: Arcticoidea
- Family: Arcticidae
- Genus: Arctica
- Species: A. islandica

Binomial name
- Arctica islandica Linnaeus, 1767

= Arctica islandica =

Ocean quahog

Species of bivalve

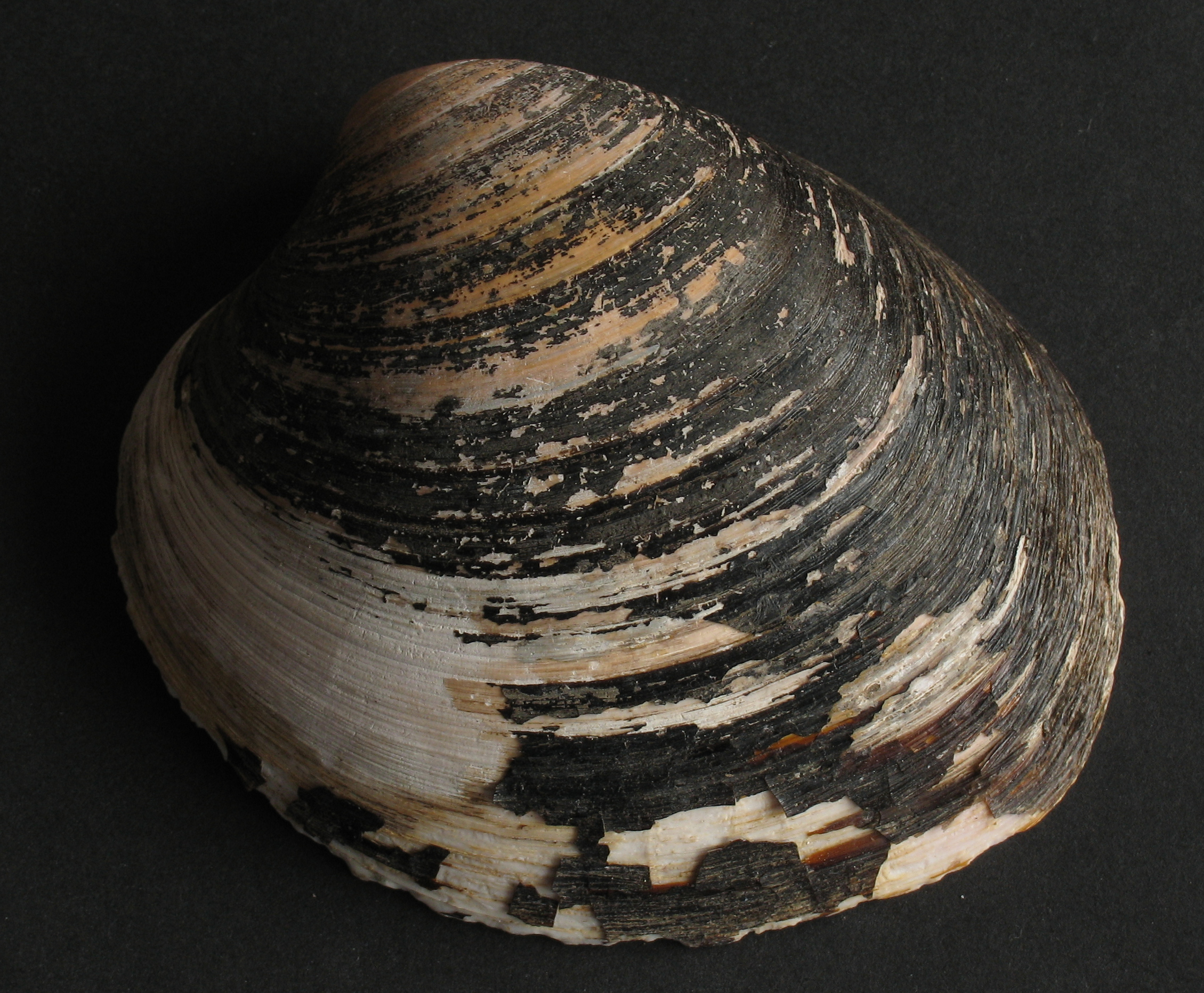
The dark periostracum is flaking off this dried valve of A. islandica from Wales

The ocean quahog (Arctica islandica) is a species of edible clam, a marine bivalve mollusk in the family Arcticidae. This species is native to the North Atlantic Ocean, and it is harvested commercially as a food source. This species is also known by a number of different common names, including Icelandic cyprine, mahogany clam, mahogany quahog, black quahog, and black clam.

The typical A. islandica resembles the quahog, but the shell of the ocean quahog is rounder, the periostracum is usually black, and on the interior of the shell, the pallial line has no indentation, or sinus. Unlike the quahog, which lives intertidally and can be collected by clam digging, this species lives subtidally, and can only be collected by dredging. They grow to sizes exceeding 50 mm or two inches shell height. An individual specimen was reported to have lived 507 years, making it the longest-lived non-clonal metazoan whose age was accurately known.

Right and left valve of the same specimen:

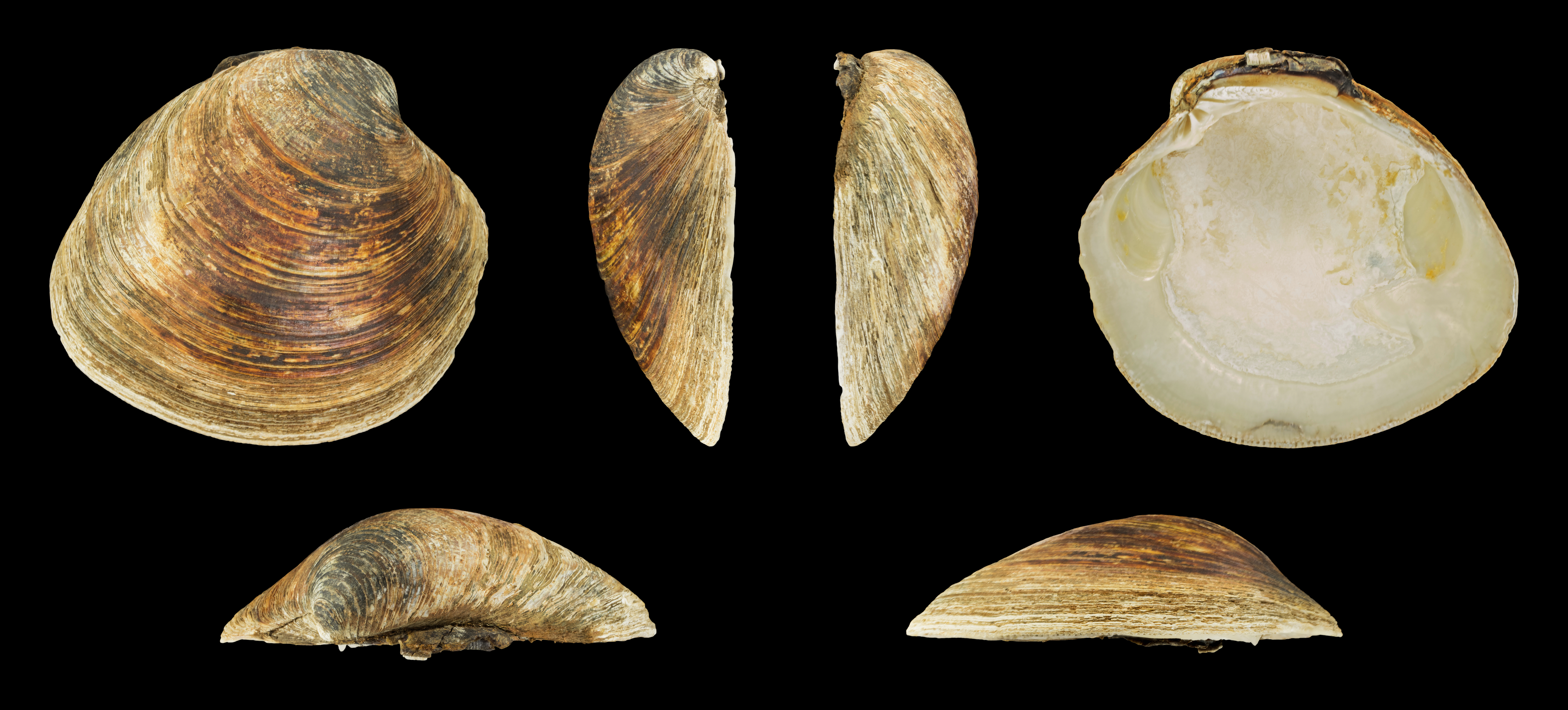
Right valve

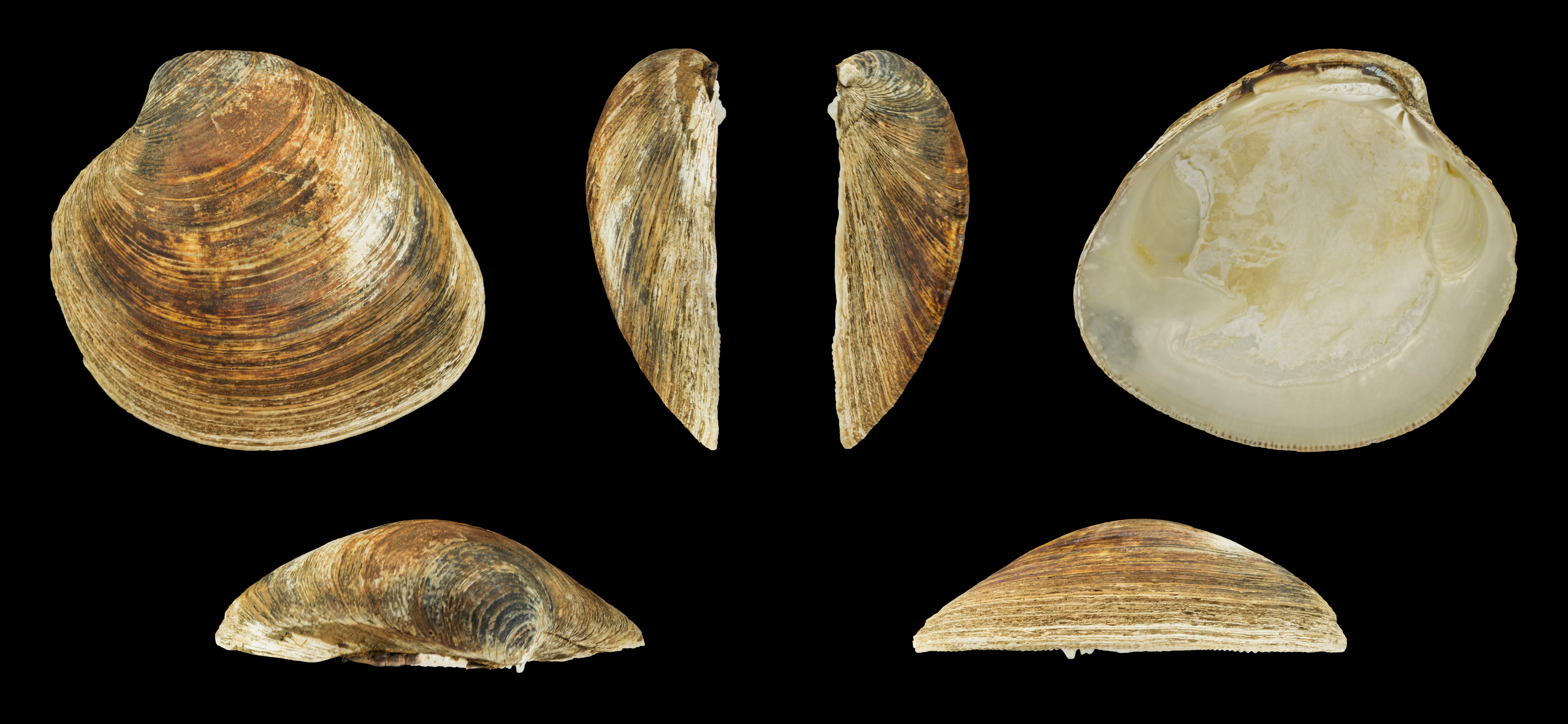
Left valve

== Life cycle and longevity ==
A. islandica shows slower growth rate than other species of clams. It takes an average rate of 4 days for birth (embryo to larvae stage). Furthermore, it takes an average of 5.8 years for A. islandica to reach maturity; at this point the somatic costs start going down. Dynamic Energy Models (DEM) predict that A. islandica's extreme longevity arises from lowered somatic maintenance costs and a low aging acceleration. For individuals in populations in cold areas the growth rate is probably further slowed because growth occurs only in summer. This slow life style results in exceptional longevity, e.g., with a reported age, for Ming the clam, of 507 years. It is the longest lived non-colonial metazoan species with an authenticated lifespan.

This characteristic has proven useful in the science of sclerochronology, the study of periodic physical and chemical features in the hard tissues of animals that grow by accretion, and is especially valuable for modeling of paleoclimates. In 1868 one specimen, collected alive near Iceland, was 374 years old. The study of its growth rate and the oxygen isotope data showed that it had a highly variable growth at the peak of the Little Ice Age around 1550–1620 and mild climate near its end around 1765–1780 and had recorded the volcanic eruption of Mount Tambora in 1815.

One study found that in animals aged 4–192 years, antioxidant enzymes declined rapidly in the first 25 years, which includes the growth and sexual maturity stages, but afterwards remained stable for over 150 years. Though more detailed studies are warranted, it appears this species is a case of negligible senescence. In contrast to the exceptionally long-lived populations in relatively deep, cold parts of its range, more southern populations that experience greater seasonal variations in salinity and temperature are typically far shorter-lived. For example, A. islandica from the German Bay of Kiel typically only reach an age of about 30 years and those from the German Bight about 150.

== Feeding ecology ==
Like other clam species, A. islandica is a filter feeder. Feeding activity appears regulated by light levels, which can be used as a proxy for food availability. This means that at the northern extreme of the distribution, feeding is concentrated during eight months of the year, while during the rest of the year the clams feed for only a few days a month.

== See also ==
- List of long-living organisms
- Maximum life span
- Ming (clam)
