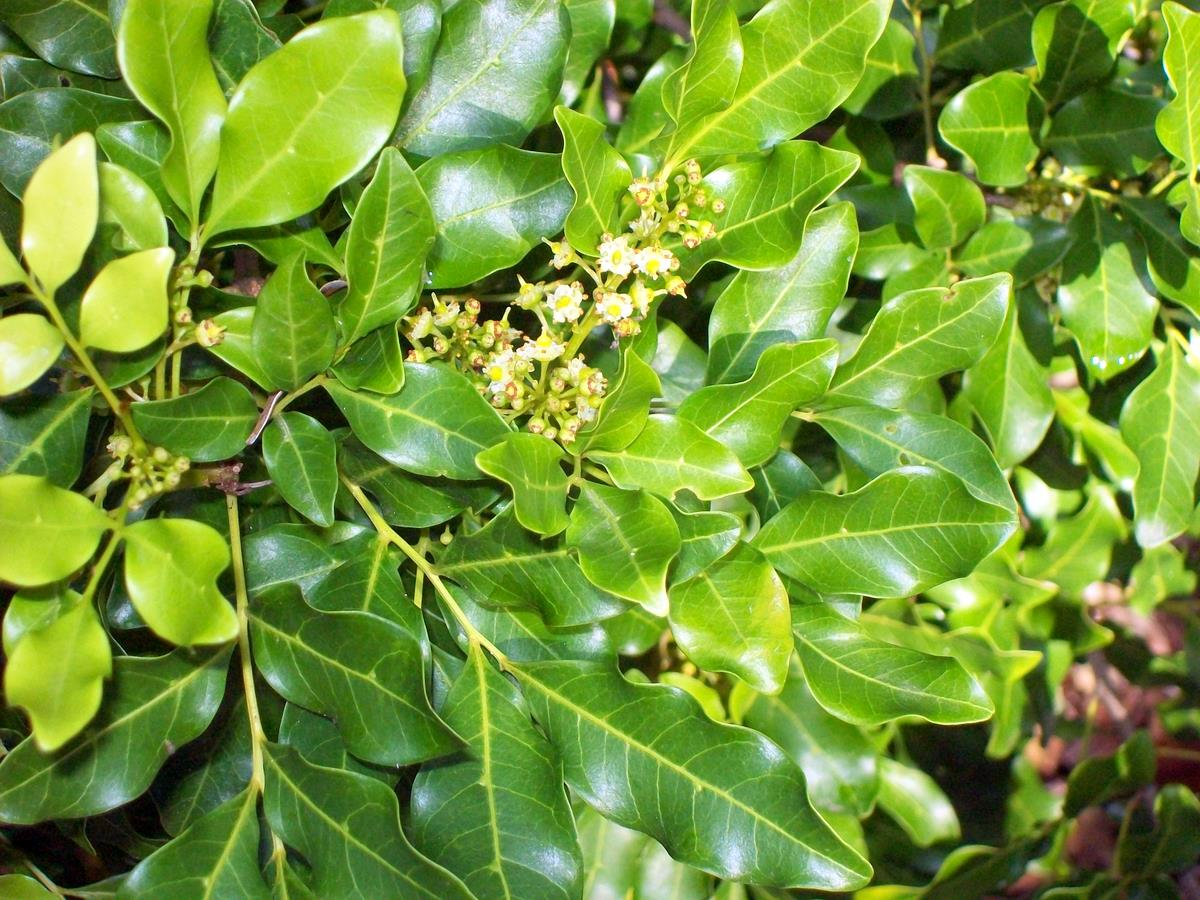

Scientific classification
- Kingdom: Plantae
- Clade: Tracheophytes
- Clade: Angiosperms
- Clade: Eudicots
- Clade: Rosids
- Order: Sapindales
- Family: Sapindaceae
- Genus: Toechima
- Species: T. tenax

Binomial name
- Toechima tenax (Benth.) Radlk.

Synonyms
- Ratonia tenax Benth.; Cupania tenax Benth. F.Muell.

= Toechima tenax =

Brush teak

Species of tree

Toechima tenax, known as the brush teak, is a rainforest tree found in eastern Australia. The specific epithet tenax probably refers to the tough wood.

It grows in the drier rainforests from the Richmond River, New South Wales in the south to Bundaberg in Queensland in the north. It is rarely seen in New South Wales.

A small tree with a bright green canopy, up to 18 metres tall and a stem diameter of 30 cm. The trunk is irregular, grey and smooth, the tree's base is usually buttressed.
