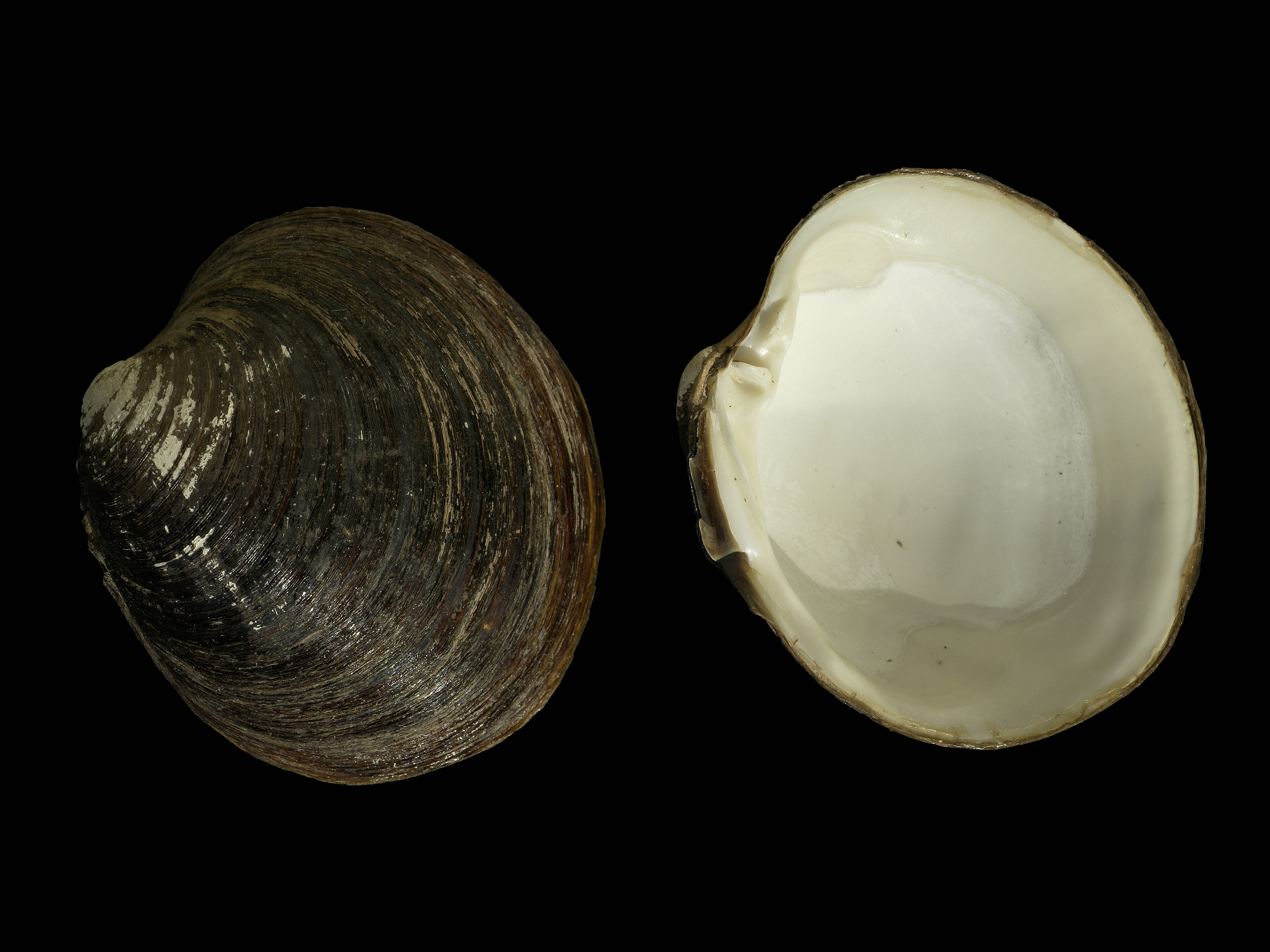
- A shell of Arctica islandica with the valves separated

Scientific classification
- Domain: Eukaryota
- Kingdom: Animalia
- Phylum: Mollusca
- Class: Bivalvia
- Order: Venerida
- Family: Arcticidae
- Genus: Arctica; Schumacher, 1817

= Arctica (bivalve) =

Genus of bivalves

Arctica is a genus of saltwater clams, marine bivalve mollusks in the family Arcticidae. In the present day this is a monotypic genus (contains only one species), however there are a number of additional species in the fossil record.

== Species ==
Species within the genus Arctica include

Living species:

- Arctica islandica Linnaeus, 1767

Fossil species:

- †Arctica limpidiana
- †Arctica murrayensis
- †Arctica provencialis
- †Arctica subanthooensis
