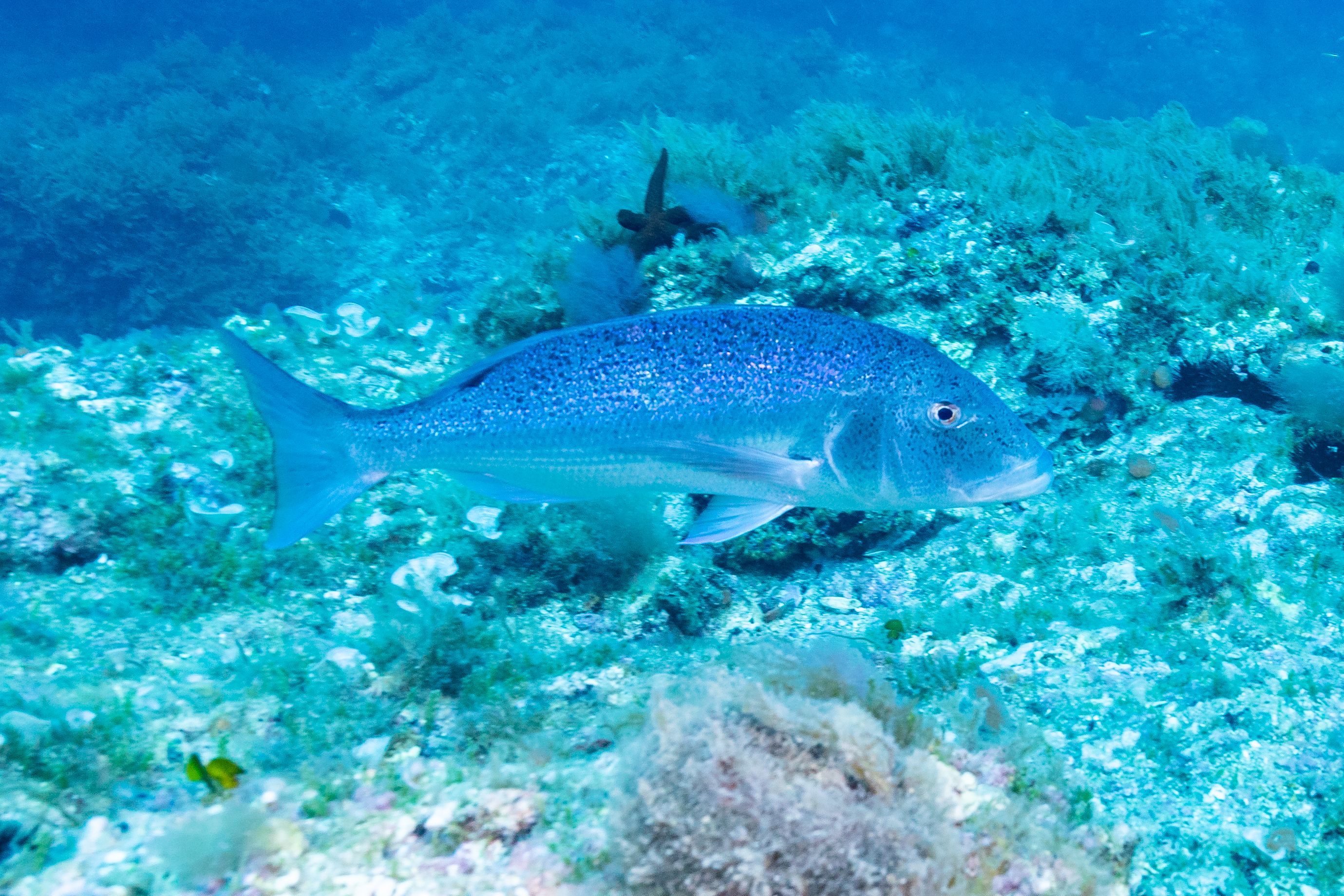
- Dentex dentex

Scientific classification
- Kingdom: Animalia
- Phylum: Chordata
- Class: Actinopterygii
- Division: Teleostei
- Order: Acanthuriformes
- Family: Sparidae
- Genus: Dentex; G. Cuvier, 1814

Type species
- Sparus dentex Linnaeus, 1758

Synonyms
- Allotaius Whitley, 1937; Opsodentex Fowler, 1925; Synagris Bleeker, 1876; Taius D. S. Jordan & Thompson, 1912

= Dentex =

Dentex Temporal range: Middle Miocene to present

Genus of fishes

Dentex is a genus of marine ray-finned fishes belonging to the family Sparidae, which includes the seabreams and porgies. The fishes in this genus are found in the eastern Atlantic Ocean and the eastern Indian and Western Pacific Oceans.

== Taxonomy ==
Dentex was first proposed as a genus by the French zoologist Georges Cuvier in 1814, Sparus dentex was the type species by absolute tautonymy. S. dentex had been described in 1758 by Carl Linnaeus in the 10th Edition of his Systema Naturae from the Mediterranean Sea. The five Indo-Pacific species form a species complex called the Dentex hypselosomus species complex but have not been separated into their own genus. This genus is placed in the family Sparidae within the order Spariformes by the 5th edition of Fishes of the World. Some authorities classify this genus in the subfamily Denticinae, but the 5th edition of Fishes of the World does not recognise subfamilies within the Sparidae.

== Etymology ==
Dentex means "with large teeth", is tautonymous with Linnaeus's Sparus dentex, and is a reference to the large teeth in both jaws.

== Species ==
There are currently 14 recognized species in this genus:

- Dentex abei Iwatsuki, Akazaki & Taniguchi, 2007 (Yellowfin seabream)
- Dentex angolensis Poll & Maul, 1953 (Angolan dentex)
- Dentex barnardi Cadenat, 1970 (Barnard's dentex)
- Dentex canariensis Steindachner, 1881 (Canary dentex)
- Dentex carpenteri Iwatsuki, S. J. Newman & B. C. Russell, 2015 (Yellow snout seabream)
- Dentex congoensis Poll, 1954 (Congo dentex)
- Dentex dentex (Linnaeus, 1758) (Common dentex)
- Dentex fourmanoiri Akazaki & Séret, 1999 (Fourmanoir's seabream)
- Dentex gibbosus (Rafinesque, 1810) (Pink dentex)
- Dentex hypselosomus Bleeker, 1854 (Yellowback seabream)
- Dentex macrophthalmus (Bloch, 1791) (Large-eye dentex)
- Dentex maroccanus Valenciennes, 1830 (Morocco dentex)
- Dentex spariformis J. D. Ogilby, 1910 (Saffronfin seabream)

The Eocene fossil species Dentex laekeniensis van Beneden, 1872 is generally placed in its own genus, Ctenodentex. Fossil specimens of modern Dentex are known from the Middle Miocene of the former Paratethys region, including in Hungary and Ukraine.

== Characteristics ==
Dentex seabreams are characterised within the Sparidae by the possession of a series of sharp conical teeth in each jaw, 4 in the upper jaw and 6 in the lower jaw, These teeth are enlarged and canine-like and they have no molar-like teeth. The scales between the eyes extend to near a level with the front part of the orbit. The flange on the preoperculum is completely covered in scales. The largest species in the genus is the pink dentex (D. gibbosus) with a maximum published fork length of 106 cm (42 in) while the smallest is D. fourmanoiri which has a maximum published standard length of 21.5 cm (8.5 in).

== Distribution ==
Dentex sea breams are found in the Eastern Atlantic Ocean, from Europe to Namibia, and in the Eastern Indian and Western Pacific Ocean from Japan south to Australia.
