= Dentex abei =

Conservation status
- Least Concern (IUCN 3.1)

Scientific classification
- Kingdom: Animalia
- Phylum: Chordata
- Class: Actinopterygii
- Order: Acanthuriformes
- Family: Sparidae
- Genus: Dentex
- Species: D. abei

Binomial name
- Dentex abei Iwatsuki, Akazaki & Taniguchi, 2007

Species of fish

Dentex abei, the yellowfin seabream, is a species of marine ray-finned fish belonging to the family Sparidae, which includes the seabreams and porgies. This species is found in the Western Pacific Ocean in East Asia.

== Taxonomy ==
Dentex abei was first formally described in 2007 by Yukio Iwatsuki, Masato Akazaki and Nobuhiko Taniguchi with its type locality given as Okinawa Island in the Ryukyu Islands of southern Japan. This species is one of the four Indo-Pacific species, along with D. carpenteri, D. fourmanoiri, D. hypselosomus and D, spariformis within the genus Dentex which form a species complex called the Dentex hypselosomus species complex but have not been separated into their own genus. The genus Dentex is placed in the family Sparidae within the order Spariformes by the 5th edition of Fishes of the World. Some authorities classify this genus in the subfamily Denticinae, but the 5th edition of Fishes of the World does not recognise subfamilies within the Sparidae.

== Etymology ==
Dentex abei honours Tokiharu Abe, an ichthyologist at the Zoological Institute of Tokyo University, a researcher on Japanese fishes and who knew of the uniqueness of this species.

== Description ==
Dentex abei has its dorsal fin supported by 12 spines and 10 soft rays while there are 3 spines and 8 soft rays supporting the anal fin. It has relatively small eyes and a blunt snout. The overall colour of the body is pinkish red silver tints with 5 to 6 lines of blue spots visible on looking from above with a similar line of blue spots irising diagonally obliquely above the lateral line. There is no yellow blotch on the snout. The membrane of the soft rayed part of the dorsal fin is yellow with the rays being reddish. This species has a maximum published standard length of 30.7 cm (12.1 in).

== Distribution and habitat ==
Dentex abei is found in the Western Pacific Ocean where it has been recorded from the Ogasawara Islands, Ryukyu Islands, Taiwan and off Luzon. It has been recorded at depths between 50 and 150 m (160 and 490 ft) in deep water reefs and banks.
