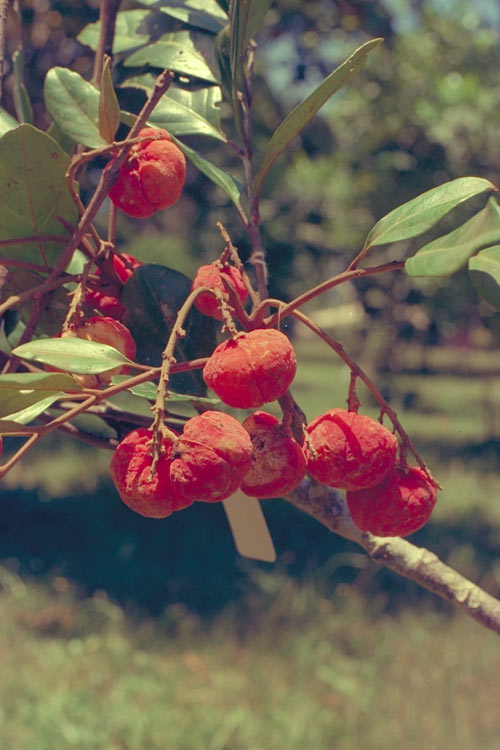

Scientific classification
- Kingdom: Plantae
- Clade: Tracheophytes
- Clade: Angiosperms
- Clade: Eudicots
- Clade: Rosids
- Order: Sapindales
- Family: Sapindaceae
- Genus: Toechima
- Species: T. monticola

Binomial name
- Toechima monticola S.T.Reynolds, 1985

= Toechima monticola =

Species of flowering plant

Toechima monticola, also known as mountain tamarind, is a species of plant in the lychee family that is endemic to Australia.

== Description ==
The species grows as a small tree, with a DBH rarely more than 20 cm. The pinnate leaves have 4–10 leaflets, which are 6–16.5 cm long and 2.8–5.2 cm wide. The flowers occur in inflorescences. The roundish orange fruits are about 20 mm in diameter.

== Distribution and habitat ==
The species is restricted to the area between Mount Spurgeon and the southern margin of the Atherton Tableland, with elevations of 700–1200 m, in the understorey of mature mountain rainforest in tropical Far North Queensland.
