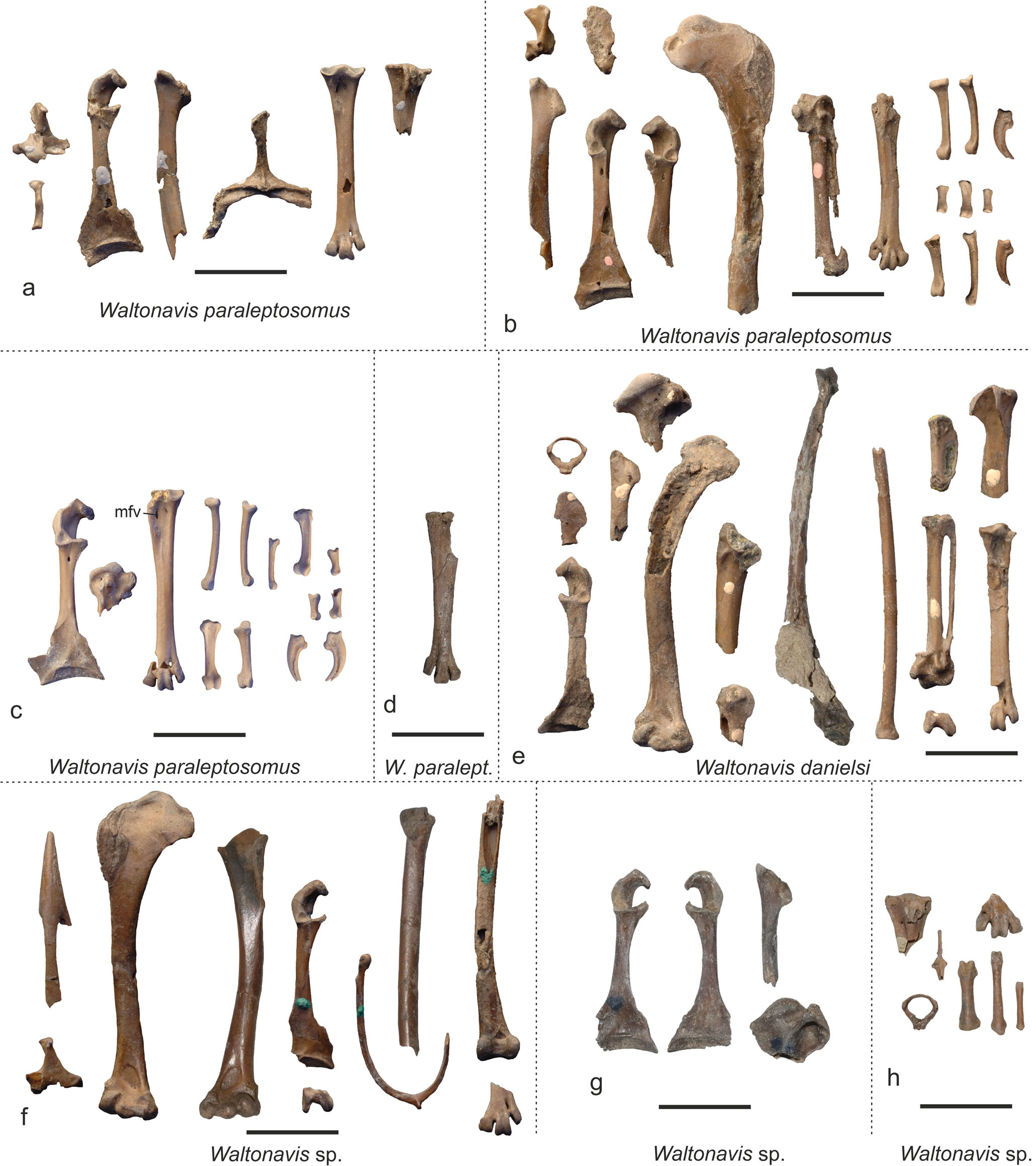
- Fossil material of Waltonavis spp.

Scientific classification
- Kingdom: Animalia
- Phylum: Chordata
- Class: Aves
- Clade: Coraciimorphae
- Clade: Cavitaves
- Order: Leptosomiformes (?)
- Genus: †Waltonavis; Mayr & Kitchener, 2022

Type species
- †Waltonavis paraleptosomus Mayr & Kitchener, 2022

Other species
- †W. danielsi Mayr & Kitchener, 2022

= Waltonavis =

Waltonavis Temporal range: early Eocene, 54.6–55 Ma

Extinct genus of birds

Waltonavis (meaning "Walton bird") is an extinct genus of potentially leptosomiform bird from the Early Eocene London Clay Formation of Essex, United Kingdom. The genus contains two species: W. paraleptosomus and W. danielsi, both known from partial skeletons.

== Discovery and naming ==
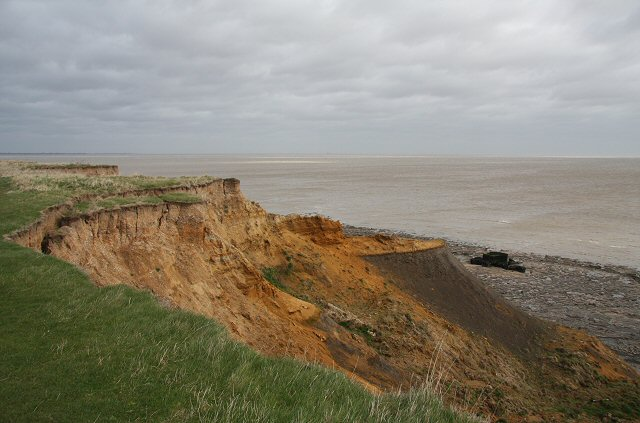
Cliffs near the type locality

Waltonavis was described in 2022 by German paleontologist Gerald Mayr and British zoologist Andrew C. Kitchener. The generic name, "Waltonavis", combines a reference to the type locality with the Latin word "avis", meaning "bird". The type species, W. paraleptosomus, was described on the basis of a partial skeleton collected in 1988. This specimen, NMS.Z.2021.40.16, which includes the left quadrate and pterygoid, a partial left scapula, a left coracoid, the cranial portion of the sternum, and a left and partial right tarsometatarsus, was designated as the holotype. NMS.Z.2021.40.17—19, additional specimens collected in 1996, 1983, and 1988, respectively, include more fossil material, including the remains of a juvenile individual. They were also referred to W. paraleptosomus. These fossils were discovered by Michael Daniels in layers of the London Clay Formation (Walton Member), dated to the early Ypresian, which is located near Walton-on-the-Naze in Essex, England. The specific name, "paraleptosomus", is derived from the Greek “παρα” (“para”) and the name of the extant bird Leptosomus, in reference to similarities between the bones of the two taxa.

Additional fossil material collected in 1985 was assigned to a separate species of Waltonavis, W. danielsi. The holotype of W. danielsi, NMS.Z.2021.40.20, consists of several vertebrae, the right coracoid, a partial right scapula, a right humerus, a partial left humerus, a right ulna, a partial left ulna, a left carpometacarpus, partial phalanges, a partial right femur, a partial right tibiotarsus, and a partial left tarsometatarsus. The specific name, “danielsi” honors Michael Daniels, the discoverer of the holotype.

Several additional fragmentary skeletons collected in the late 1900s by Daniels were assigned to Waltonavis, but they lack sufficient material to be assigned to either W. paraleptosomus or W. danielsi.

== Description ==
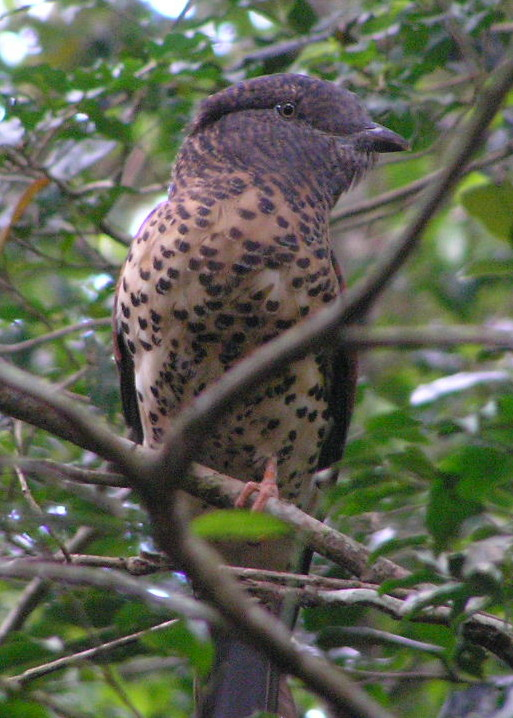
An extant Leptosomus discolor (cuckoo-roller), a relative of Waltonavis

Waltonavis was similar in size and morphology to Lapillavis, an extinct bird from the mid-Eocene Messel pit of Germany. It also shows several similarities to the larger extant Leptosomus, which feeds on large insects and small reptiles. Due to differences in beak and wing bone shape, Waltonavis likely had feeding habits distinct from Leptosomus.

== Classification ==
Mayr and Kitchener (2022) noted several similarities between Waltonavis and leptosomiforms. They suggested that an assignment to the Leptosomiformes is likely, but that a unique combination of features makes precise classification difficult. The cladogram below displays the relation of Waltonavis within Telluraves.

- Telluraves
  - - - Cariamidae
      - †Phorusrhacidae
    - - Falconidae
      - - Psittaciformes
        - Passeriformes
  - - - Cathartidae
      - - Accipitridae
        - Sagittariidae
    - - Strigiformes
      - - Coliidae
        - - - Leptosomidae
            - †Waltonavis
          - - Trogonidae
            - - - Upupiformes
                - Bucerotiformes
              - - Piciformes
                - - - Meropidae
                    - - Coraciidae
                      - Brachypteraciidae
                  - - Todidae
                    - - Momotidae
                      - Alcedinidae

== See also ==
- Paleobiota of the London Clay
