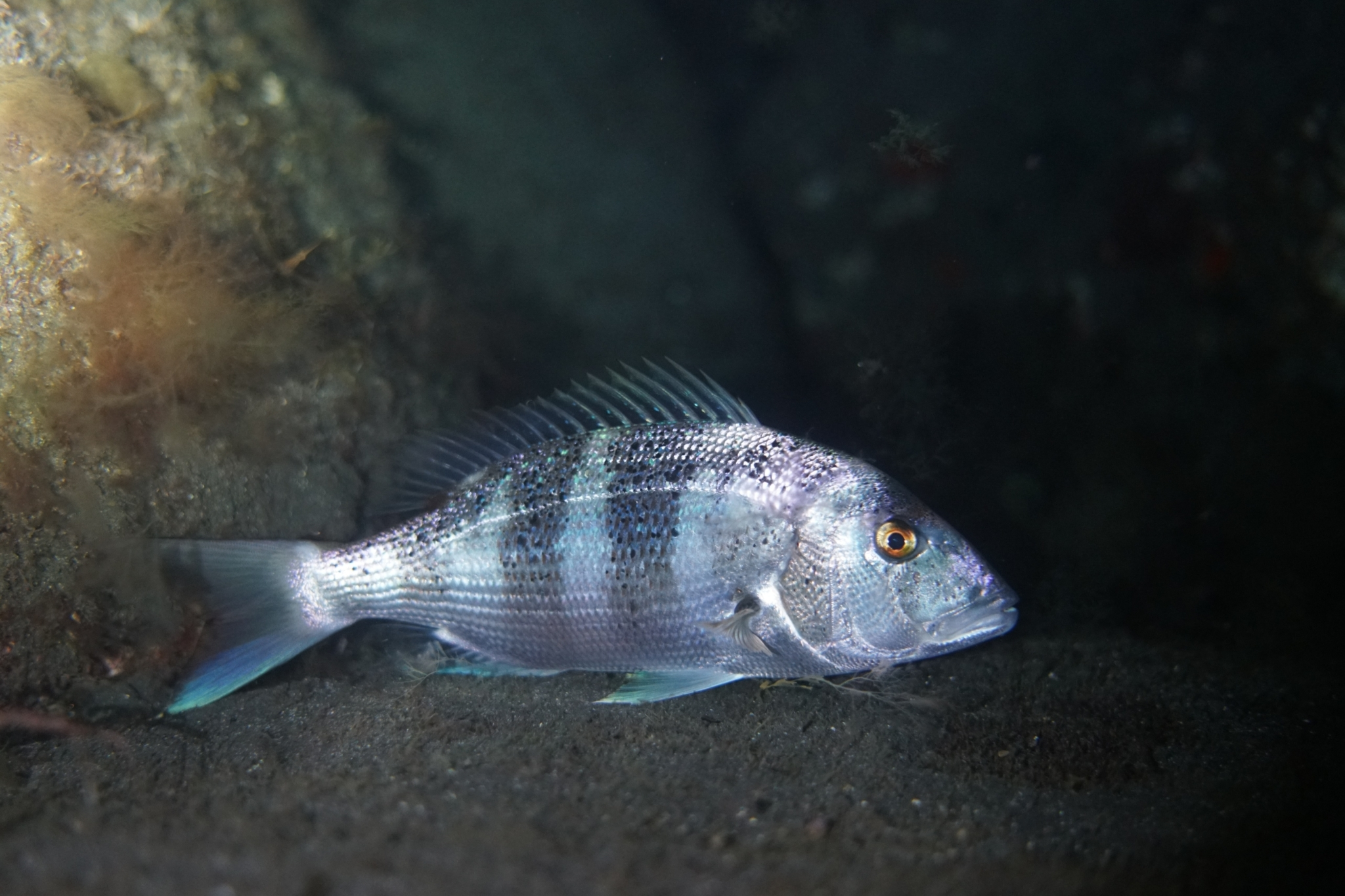
- Common dentex off Canary islands (Spain)

Conservation status
- Vulnerable (IUCN 3.1)

Scientific classification
- Kingdom: Animalia
- Phylum: Chordata
- Class: Actinopterygii
- Division: Teleostei
- Order: Acanthuriformes
- Family: Sparidae
- Genus: Dentex
- Species: D. dentex

Binomial name
- Dentex dentex (Linnaeus, 1758)
- Distribution map

Synonyms
- Dentex vulgaris Valenciennes, 1830; Sparus dentex Linnaeus, 1758

= Common dentex =

Species of fish

The common dentex (Dentex dentex) is a species of marine ray-finned fish belonging to the family Sparidae, which includes the seabreams and porgies. This species is found in the northeastern Atlantic Ocean and the Mediterranean Sea. It is a highly valued food fish and is an important target species for fisheries and the population has shown large declines leading the International Union for Conservation of Nature to classify its conservation status as Vulnerable.

== Taxonomy ==
The common dentex was first formally described as Sparus dentex by Carl Linnaeus in the 10th edition of his Systema Naturae. Linnaeus gave type locality as the Atlantic Ocean and the Mediterranean Sea. In 1814 Georges Cuvier proposed the genus Dentex with Sparus dentex as the type species by absolute tautonymy. The genus Dentex is placed in the family Sparidae within the order Spariformes by the 5th edition of Fishes of the World. Some authorities classify this genus in the subfamily Denticinae, but the 5th edition of Fishes of the World does not recognise subfamilies within the Sparidae.

== Etymology ==
The common dentex has the binomial Dentex dentex which is a tautonym. Dentex means "with large teeth", an allusion to the rows of canine-like teeth with the outermost row being the biggest and those in the front of the jaws being the most enlarged.

== Description ==
The common dentex has the dorsal fin supported by 11 spines, the spines increase in length from the first to the fourth or fifth and then are roughly equal in length from spine 6 to 12, and 11 or 12 soft rays while the anal fin has 3 spines and between 7 and 9 soft rays supporting it. The body is oval shaped and compressed. The dorsal profile of the head is smoothly rounded in adults but nearly straight in juveniles and is slightly convex in the largest specimens. The eyes are small and the space below them is wide. The cheeks are scaled as is the preoperculum except for its rear edge. The mouth is positioned low on the head and is slightly upward pointing. There are a number of rows of teeth, all are canine-like, with the most well-developed being in the front of the jaws. The young fishes are greyish with black spots on the back and upper flanks, changing to pink as they mature and the oldest specimens are bluish-grey with the dark spots fading and becoming more indistinct. The maximum published total length of the common dentex is 100 cm (39 in), although 50 cm (20 in) is more typical and the maximum published weight is 14.3 kg (32 lb).

== Distribution and habitat ==
The common dentex is found in the northeastern Atlantic Ocean between the Bay of Biscay and Ras Nouadhibouin Mauritania, as well as the Canaries and Madeira. It is rare as far north as the British Isles. It is also found throughout the Mediterranean Sea and into the western Black Sea. This is a benthopelagic fish found at depths down to 200 m (660 ft), although commonest at 15 to 50 m (49 to 164 ft), over rocky substrates in inshore waters.

== Biology ==
The common dentex is an active predator, feeding on other fish, mollusca and cephalopods. It is solitary for most of the year, but during reproduction it lives in groups for some weeks: fully-grown dentex stay together just two to three weeks during spring in the warmer water near the surface. A study off Mallorca found that males and females showed no differences in size, that spawning occurred in Spring and that both males and females reached sexual maturity at 2 to 4 years old. Most common dentex are gonochoristic but hermaphroditism has been recorded. The adults tend to be solitary when not spawning while the juveniles aggregate in schools.

== Fisheries and conservation ==
The common dentex is a highly valued food fish with a high commercial value and it has a life history which makes it vulnerable to overfishing, i.e. it is long-lived, slow-growing and is large bodied. In the Mediterranean its abundance increases within marine protected areas but it is scarce outside of these areas. Landings of common dentex increased drastically in the 1970s and 1980s before falling by 30% in the 1990s. The catches in the Mediterranean and West Africa decreased by 37% and 70%, respectively. Overall the total population for this species has been estimated to have declined by over 30% over the three generations (equivalent to 36 years) up to 2009 and the IUCN classifies this species as Vulnerable. This species is caught using bottom trawls, lines, fish traps and sometimes trammel nets. It is a popular sport fish for recreational anglers too. Bosnia and Herzegovina and Spain have reported producing this fish in aquaculture to the Food and Agriculture Organization of the United Nations (FAO).
