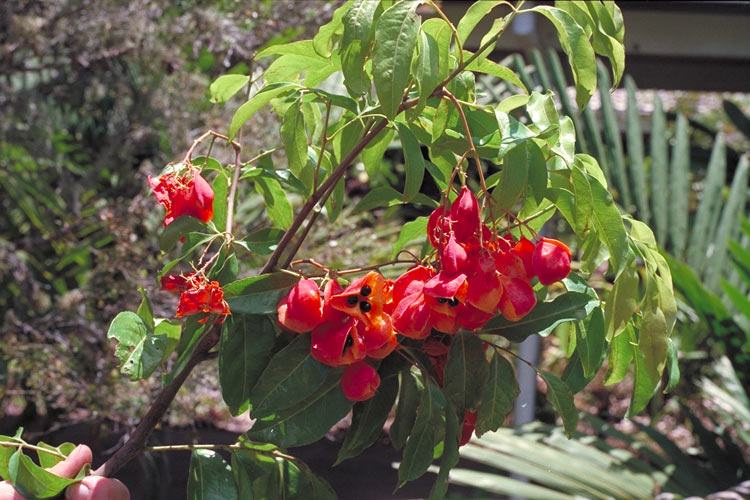

Conservation status
- Endangered (EPBC Act)

Scientific classification
- Kingdom: Plantae
- Clade: Tracheophytes
- Clade: Angiosperms
- Clade: Eudicots
- Clade: Rosids
- Order: Sapindales
- Family: Sapindaceae
- Genus: Toechima
- Species: T. pterocarpum

Binomial name
- Toechima pterocarpum S.T.Reynolds, 1985

= Toechima pterocarpum =

Species of plant in the family Sapindaceae

Toechima pterocarpum, also known as orange tamarind, is a species of plant in the lychee family endemic to Australia.

== Description ==
The species grow as a large shrub or small tree to 4 m in height. The pinnate leaves are 12–24 cm long, with the oval to sickle-shaped leaflets 2–11 cm long. The flowers occur in pendulous inflorescences. The fruits are 3-lobed, winged, orange to red seed capsules 3 cm long.

== Distribution and habitat ==
The species is known from the area around Julatten, Mossman and Wangetti in Far North Queensland. The plants are found in lowland tropical rainforest, often along streams, at elevations from sea level to 450 m.

== Conservation ==
The species has been listed as Endangered under Australia's EPBC Act. The main threat is from land clearing for agriculture and housing.
