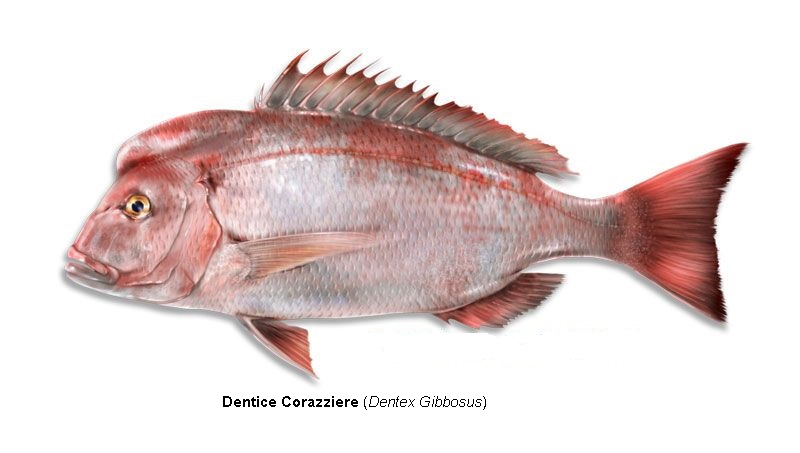

Conservation status
- Least Concern (IUCN 3.1)

Scientific classification
- Kingdom: Animalia
- Phylum: Chordata
- Class: Actinopterygii
- Division: Teleostei
- Order: Acanthuriformes
- Family: Sparidae
- Genus: Dentex
- Species: D. gibbosus

Binomial name
- Dentex gibbosus (Rafinesque, 1810)

Synonyms
- Sparus gibbosus Rafinesque, 1810; Dentex filosus Valenciennes, 1841; Cheimerius filosus (Valenciennes, 1841)

= Pink dentex =

Species of fish

The pink dentex (Dentex gibbosus) is a species of marine ray-finned fish belonging to the family Sparidae, a family that includes the seabreams and porgies. This species is found in the temperate and tropical waters of the eastern Atlantic Ocean and the Mediterranean Sea.

== Taxonomy ==
The pink dentex was first formally described in 1810 as Sparus gibbosus by the French naturalist and polymath Constantine Samuel Rafinesque with its type locality given as Sicily. The genus Dentex is placed in the family Sparidae within the order Spariformes by the 5th edition of Fishes of the World. Some authorities classify this genus in the subfamily Denticinae, but the 5th edition of Fishes of the World does not recognise subfamilies within the Sparidae.

== Etymology ==
The pink dentex has the specific name gibbosus which means "humpbacked", a reference to the bulging foreheads of the large adults of this species.

== Distribution and habitat ==
The pink dentex is found in the eastern Atlantic Ocean from Portugal in the north as far south as Angola, including Madeira, the Canary Islands and São Tomé and Príncipe. In the Mediterranean it is found throughout except for the northwestern part of the sea and the northern Adriatic Sea. It is found at depths between 20 and 220 m (66 and 722 ft) over substrates rock and rubble on the continental shelf. The juveniles occur near to the shore whereas the adults are found offshore close to the continental slope.

== Description ==
The pink dentex has an oval, rather elongate, laterally compressed body. In younger fish the dorsal profile of the head is smoothly convex but as the fish ages it develops an obvious hump on the front of the head. The mouth is set low and points slightly upwards and the jaws are roughly equal in length. Typical of the genus Dentex there are several rows of canine-like teeth with outer row of teeth being the most robust and the 4 to 6 in the front of the jaws are the largest. The dorsal fin is supported by 12 spines and 10 or 11 soft rays, with the first 2 spines being very short with those behind them being very long and filamentous in juveniles and decreasing in height from the third spine rearwards. The anal fin is supported by 3 spines and between 7 and 9 soft rays. The first soft ray in the pelvic fins are filamentous. The overall colour is reddish with bluish silvery tints and paler on the ventral surfaces. There is a small black spot behind the rear end of the dorsal fin and a brownish black spot the origin of the pectoral fin. The upper corner of the operculum is dark and the soft rayed portion of the dorsal fin has 1 or two dark lines. The caudal fin is red, with a black margin. Larger specimens are frequently tinged darker red, with black spots on the head in males and greyish spots on the heads of females. The pink dentex has a maximum published fork length of 106 cm (42 in), although a total length of 60 cm (24 in)is more typical, and a maximum published weight of 16.4 kg (36 lb).

== Biology ==
The pink dentex is a predator which feeds on cephalopods, crustaceans and other fishes. This species has been reported as a rudimentary hermaphrodite, a protogynous hermaphrodite and a protandrous hermaphrodite from different areas in which it occurs. Spawning takes place between April and September.

== Fisheries ==
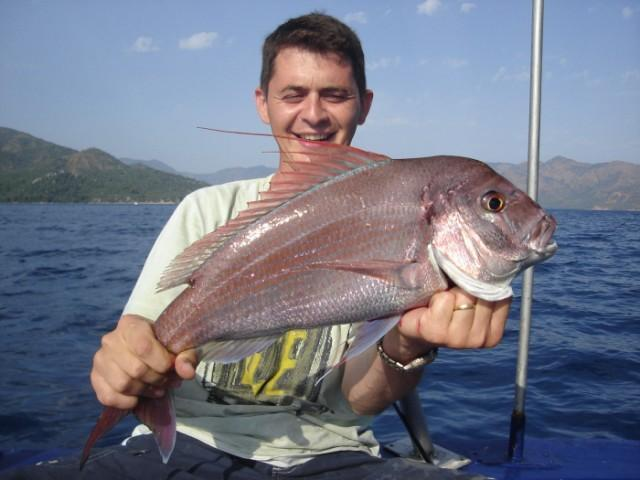
Dentex gibbosus

The pink dentex has very palatable flesh but is not subjected to intense commercial fisheries. It is common in fish markets in some areas such as Israel, although infrequent in markets in Sicily, Morocco and Greece. It is caught using fish traps, lines and bottom trawls. This species is also a game fish targeted by recreational anglers, the best areas for angling for pink dentex are the Balearic Islands, the Costa del Sol and the Tarifa area of Andalusia in Spain, Mediterranean France, Sardinia, Sicily and Naples in Italy, Montenegro and Morocco.
