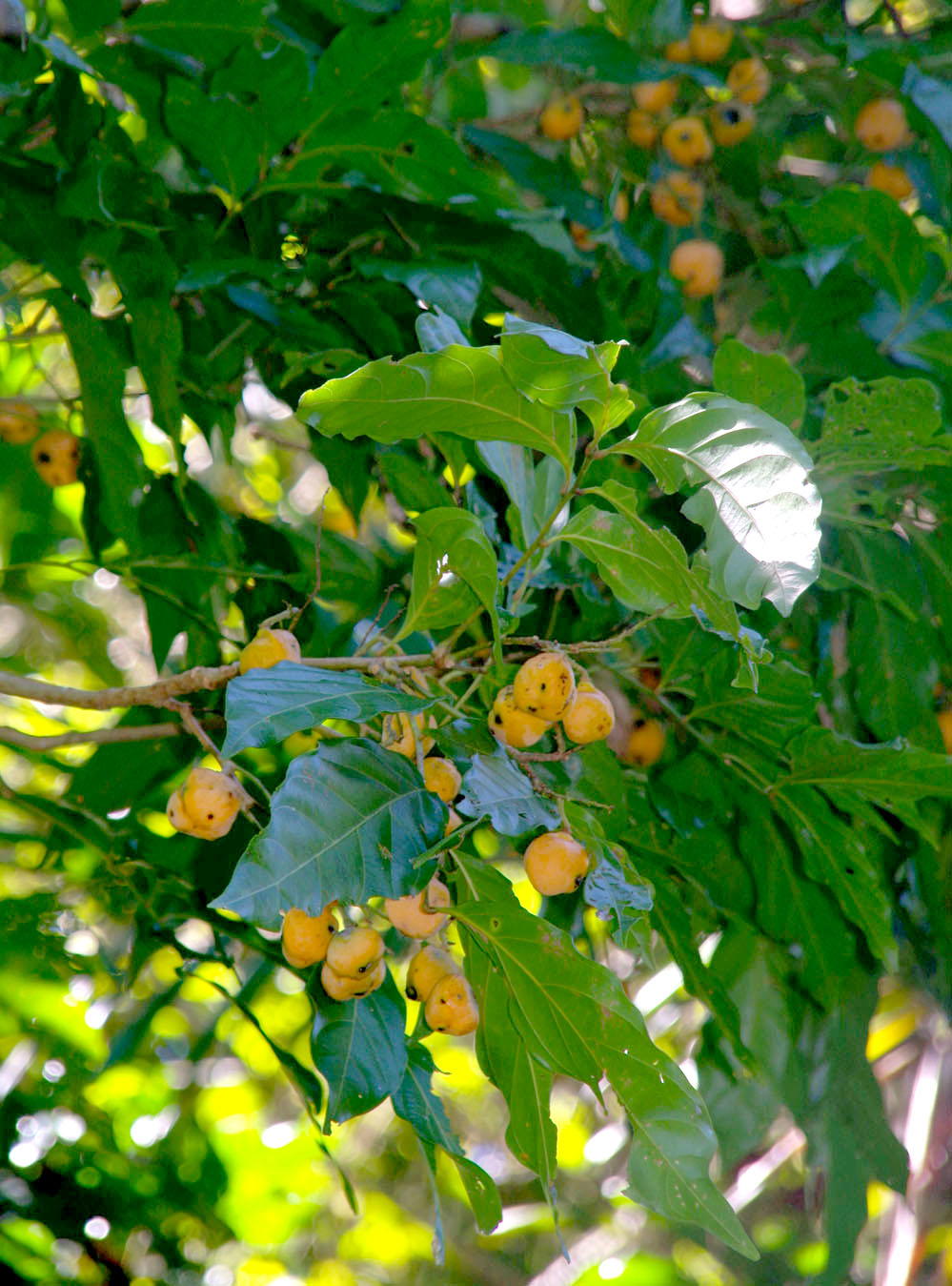

Conservation status
- Least Concern (IUCN 3.1)
- Least Concern (NCA)

Scientific classification
- Kingdom: Plantae
- Clade: Tracheophytes
- Clade: Angiosperms
- Clade: Eudicots
- Clade: Rosids
- Order: Sapindales
- Family: Sapindaceae
- Genus: Toechima
- Species: T. erythrocarpum

Binomial name
- Toechima erythrocarpum (F.Muell.) Radlk.

Subspecies
- Toechima erythrocarpum subsp. erythrocarpum; Toechima erythrocarpum subsp. papuanum Leenh.

Synonyms
- Cupania erythrocarpa F.Muell.

= Toechima erythrocarpum =

Species of flowering plant

Toechima erythrocarpum, also known as pink tamarind and foambark, is a species of plant in the lychee family Sapindaceae that is native to Australia and New Guinea.

== Description ==
The species grows as a small tree. The pinnate leaves have leaflets which are up to 23 cm (9.1 in) long and 12 cm (4.7 in) wide. The small white flowers occur in inflorescences up to 28 cm (11 in) long. The red to orange fruits, obovoid-ellipsoid in shape, may reach 35 mm (1.4 in) in length and 32 mm (1.3 in) wide.

== Taxonomy ==
This plant was initially described as Cupania erythrocarpa by the Victorian colonial botanist Ferdinand von Mueller in 1865, and later transferred to the genus Toechima by Ludwig Adolph Timotheus Radlkofer in 1879.

Two subspecies are recognised: Toechima erythrocarpum subsp. papuanum, and the autonym Toechima erythrocarpum subsp. erythrocarpum.

== Distribution and habitat ==
The species occurs in New Guinea and north-east Queensland, at elevations from sea level to 1,150 m (3,770 ft), in mature rainforest.
