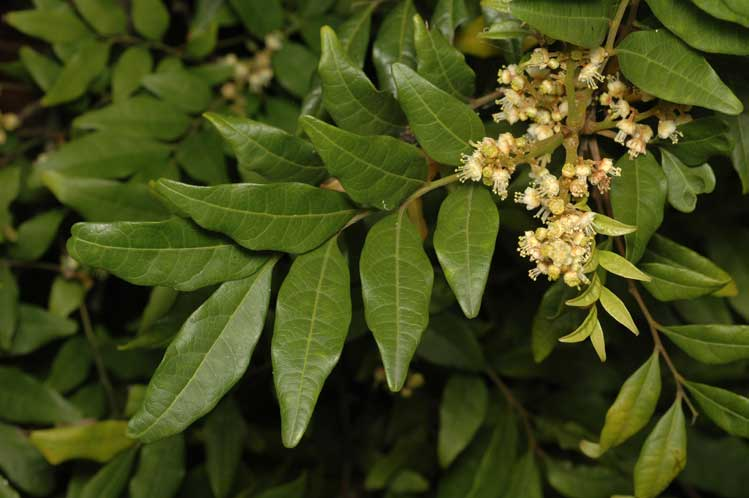

Conservation status
- Least Concern (IUCN 3.1)

Scientific classification
- Kingdom: Plantae
- Clade: Tracheophytes
- Clade: Angiosperms
- Clade: Eudicots
- Clade: Rosids
- Order: Sapindales
- Family: Sapindaceae
- Genus: Toechima
- Species: T. dasyrrhache

Binomial name
- Toechima dasyrrhache Radlk.

Synonyms
- Guioa chrysantha Radlk.

= Toechima dasyrrhache =

Species of flowering plant

Toechima dasyrrhache, also known as blunt-leaved steelwood, is a species of plant in the lychee family that is endemic to Australia.

== Description ==
The species grows as a small tree. The pinnate leaves are 8–20 cm long, with oval leaflets which are up to 2–7 cm long and 1–3 cm wide. The tiny white flowers occur in inflorescences 1–7 cm long. The red to orange fruits, 10–20 mm across, contain black seeds with yellow arils.

== Distribution and habitat ==
The species occurs in south-eastern Queensland and north-eastern New South Wales in lowland, subtropical rainforest.
