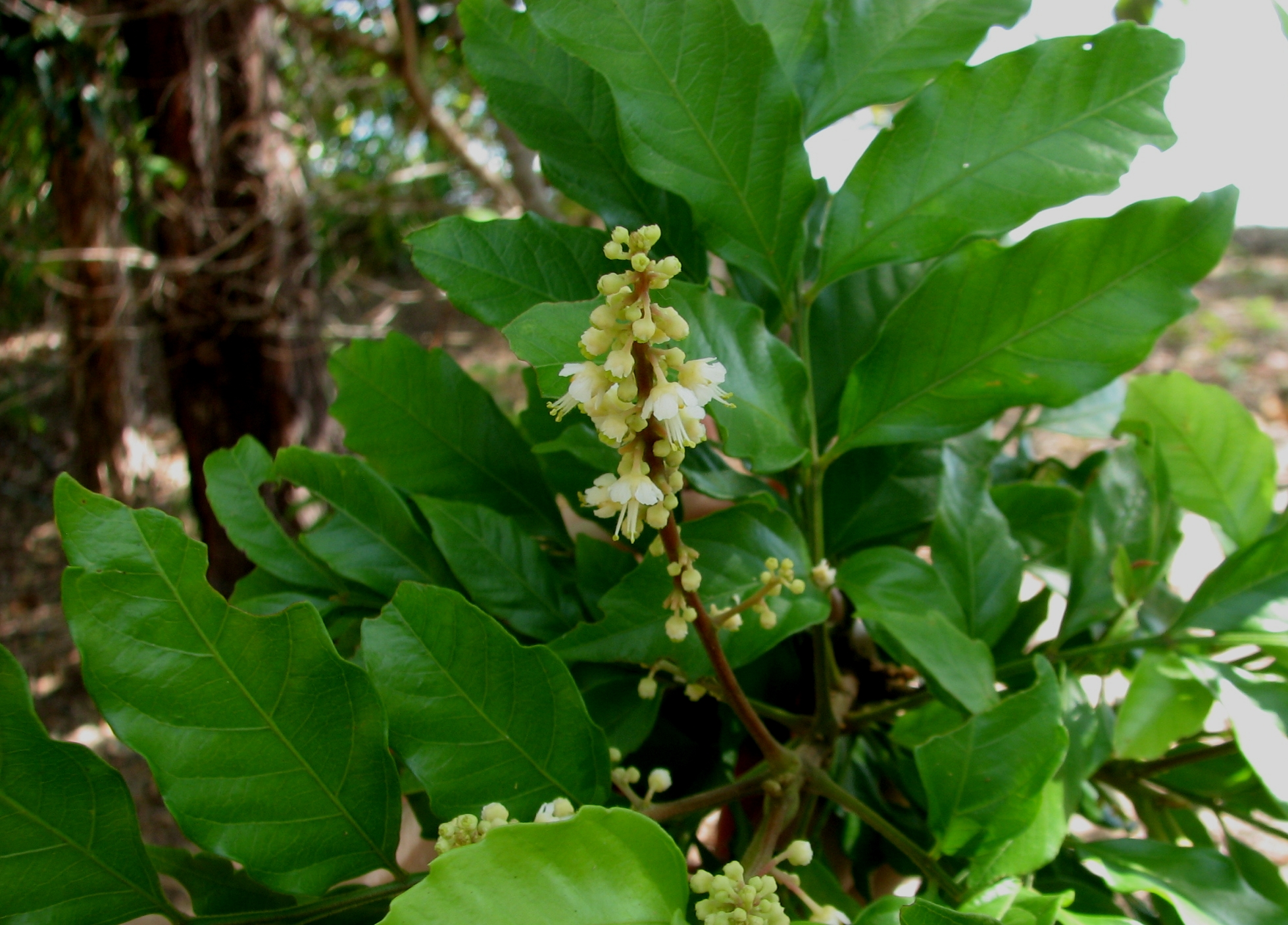

Scientific classification
- Kingdom: Plantae
- Clade: Tracheophytes
- Clade: Angiosperms
- Clade: Eudicots
- Clade: Rosids
- Order: Sapindales
- Family: Sapindaceae
- Genus: Toechima
- Species: T. daemelianum

Binomial name
- Toechima daemelianum (F.Muell.) Radlk.

Synonyms
- Cupania daemeliana F.Muell. Ratonia daemeliana (F.Muell.) F.M.Bailey

= Toechima daemelianum =

Species of tree

Toechima daemelianum, commonly known as cape tamarind, is an evergreen tree from north-east Queensland in Australia. It grows up to 13 metres high and a trunk which may be up to 20 cm wide.

The species was formally described in 1875 by Victorian Government Botanist Ferdinand von Mueller in the ninth volume of his Fragmenta Phytographiae Australiae. Mueller placed the species in the genus Cupania, naming it Cupania daemeliana, in honour of Edward Daemel who collected plant material from Cape York. In 1879, Bavarian botanist Ludwig Radlkofer reassigned the species to the genus Toechima.

Toechima daemelianum is found in dry and riverine rainforest between Cape York and Tully.
