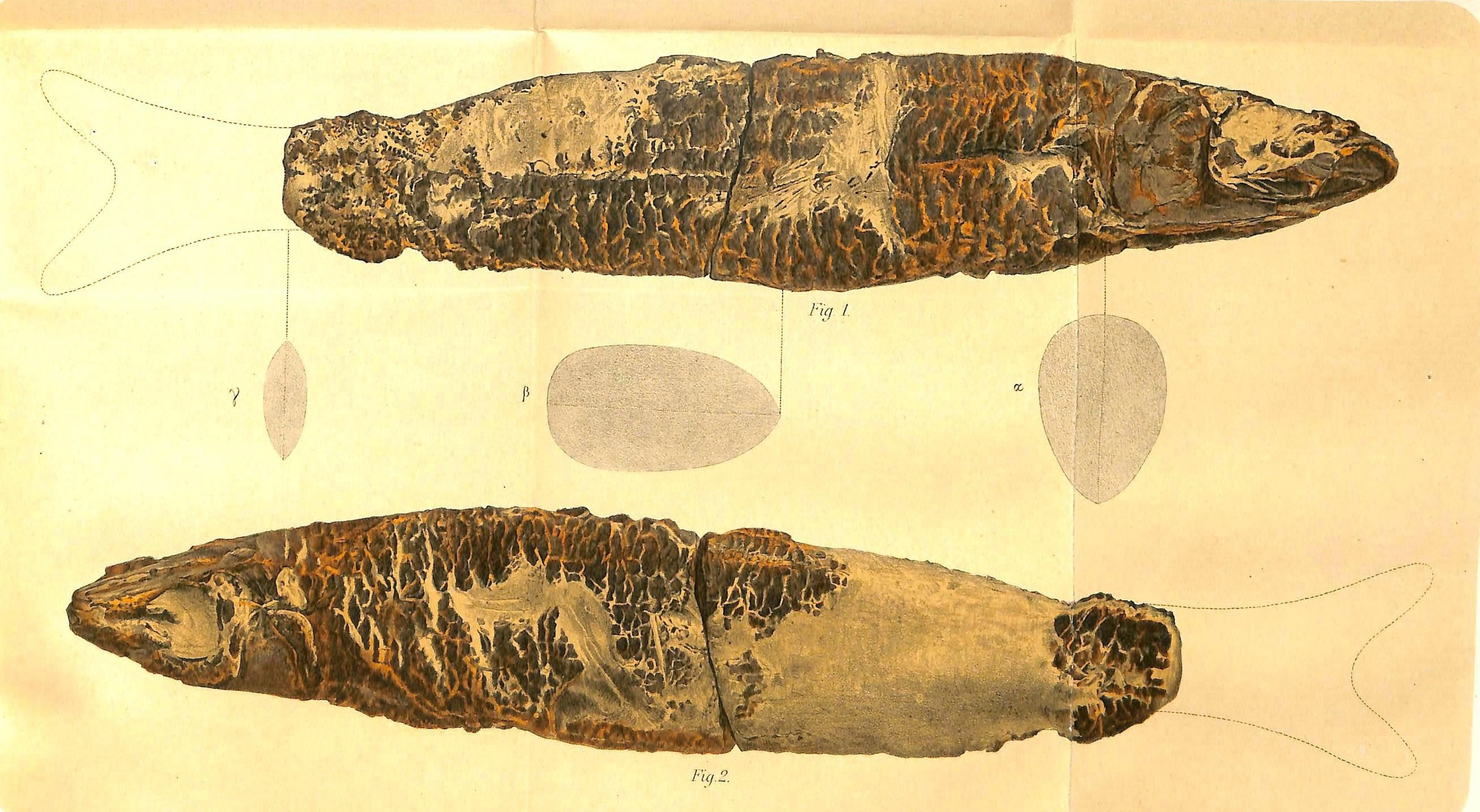
- Specimen of H. insignis from Belgium

Scientific classification
- Kingdom: Animalia
- Phylum: Chordata
- Class: Actinopterygii
- Division: Teleostei
- Order: Gonorynchiformes
- Family: †Halecopsidae; Casier, 1946
- Genus: †Halecopsis; Woodward, 1901
- Species: †H. insignis

Binomial name
- †Halecopsis insignis (Delvaux & Ortlieb, 1887)

Synonyms
- Osmeroides insignis Delvaux & Ortlieb, 1887

= Halecopsis =

Halecopsis Temporal range: Early Eocene

Halecopsis is an extinct genus of prehistoric marine gonorynchiform ray-finned fish that lived during the Early Eocene of Europe. It contains a single species, H. insignis, from England (London Clay), Belgium (Argile des Flandres), Germany (Hemmoor Clay), and northern France. It is the only member of the family Halecopsidae.

Initially classified in the genus Osmeroides, later studies found it to be a late-surviving member of an early-diverging gonorynchoid lineage, having diverged after Chanidae and the extinct Apulichthyidae, but prior to the other three extant families in the order. This divergence is estimated to have occurred in the Early Cretaceous. The extinct Neohalecopsis from the Oligocene was also previously placed in this family, but later studies suggest it may be a chanid.

Halecopsis was a small, shoaling fish that is one of the most abundant fossil fish at certain London Clay localities. The genus name Halecopsis was originally coined by Louis Agassiz for specimens of this genus, but remained a nomen nudum for decades until it was officially used by Woodward to reclassify Osmeroides insignis into its own genus.

== See also ==
- Prehistoric fish
- List of prehistoric bony fish
