= Rhynchorhinus =

Rhynchorhinus Temporal range: Lower Eocene

Scientific classification
- Kingdom: Animalia
- Phylum: Chordata
- Clade: Osteichthyes
- Genus: †Rhynchorhinus; Agassiz, 1845

Synonyms
- Rhynchorinus Agassiz, 1845

Rhynchorhinus is an extinct genus of prehistoric bony fish that lived during the lower Eocene.

== See also ==
- Prehistoric fish
- List of prehistoric bony fish
