= Serranopsis =

Serranopsis Temporal range: Early Eocene

Scientific classification
- Kingdom: Animalia
- Phylum: Chordata
- Class: Actinopterygii
- Division: Teleostei
- Order: Perciformes
- Family: Serranidae
- Genus: †Serranopsis; Casier, 1966
- Species: †S. londinensis

Binomial name
- †Serranopsis londinensis Casier, 1966

Extinct genus of fishes

Serranopsis is an extinct genus of prehistoric ray-finned fish belonging to the family Serranidae, the sea basses and groupers. The only known species in the genus is Serranopsis londinensis which was found in Ypresian marine claystone of the London Clay Formation on the Isle of Sheppey in the United Kingdom.
