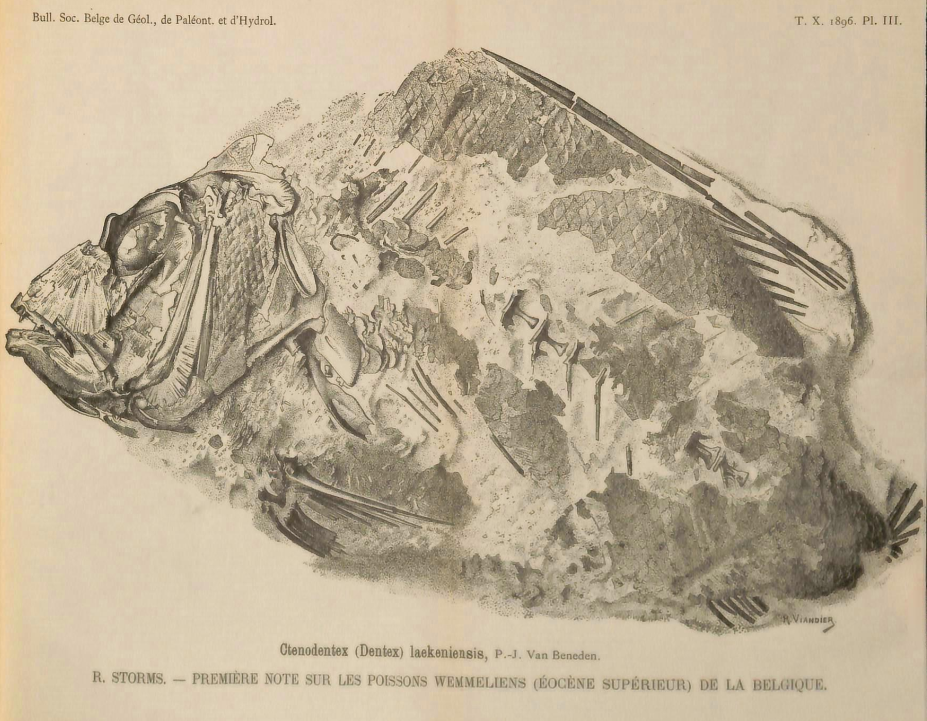
- Illustration of holotype specimen

Scientific classification
- Domain: Eukaryota
- Kingdom: Animalia
- Phylum: Chordata
- Class: Actinopterygii
- Order: Acanthuriformes
- Family: Sparidae
- Genus: †Ctenodentex; Storms, 1896
- Species: †C. laekeniensis

Binomial name
- †Ctenodentex laekeniensis (van Beneden, 1872)

Synonyms
- †Dentex laekeniensis van Beneden, 1872; †Serranus wemmeliensis Storms, 1896; †Plesioserranus Casier, 1966

= Ctenodentex =

Ctenodentex Temporal range: Bartonian

Extinct genus of fishes

Ctenodentex is an extinct genus of prehistoric seabream from the middle Eocene of Europe. It contains a single species, C. laekeniensis, from the Bartonian-aged Wemmel Member of the Maldegem Formation in Belgium. It was initially described as Dentex laekeniensis before being placed in its own genus, Ctenodentex, although some authors continue to classify it in Dentex.

Plesioserranus Casier, 1966, a putative serranid from the same formation which only contains the single species P. wemmeliensis Storms, 1896 (=Serranus wemmeliensis Storms, 1896), was found to be synonymous with C. laekeniensis based on their identical otolith morphology.

== See also ==
- Prehistoric fish
- List of prehistoric bony fish
