= Teredina =

Teredina Temporal range: Late Cretaceous – late Pliocene

Scientific classification
- Kingdom: Animalia
- Phylum: Mollusca
- Class: Bivalvia
- Order: Myida
- Family: Teredinidae
- Genus: †Teredina; Lamarck, 1818

Species
- †Teredina annulata O. Boettger, 1875; †Teredina gibberosa Staadt, 1913; †Teredina oweni Deshayes, 1856; †Teredina personata (Lamarck, 1806); †Teredina chilensis R. A. Philippi, 1887 (uncertain/unassessed)

Extinct genus of bivalves

Teredina is an extinct genus of fossil bivalve mollusc that lived from the Late Cretaceous to the late Pliocene in Asia, Europe, and North America.

Teredina shells consist of 2 short, hooked valves with a pair of furrows and each valve with transverse ridges. The overall body was long and clud-shaped. Teredina used the ridges on each valve to bore into driftwood by rocking back and forth; its long body shape allowed for large intestines for it to carry bacteria capable of breaking down the cellulose in the wood. Petrified drift wood with Teridina burrows can be found in the Cretaceous rocks of Vancouver Island.
