= Percostoma =

Percostoma Temporal range: Lower Eocene

Scientific classification
- Kingdom: Animalia
- Phylum: Chordata
- Class: Actinopterygii
- Division: Teleostei
- Order: Perciformes
- Genus: †Percostoma; Casier, 1966

Extinct genus of fishes

Percostoma is an extinct genus of prehistoric bony fish that lived during the lower Eocene.

== See also ==
- Prehistoric fish
- List of prehistoric bony fish
