= Podocarpus novae-caledoniae =

Conservation status
- Least Concern (IUCN 3.1)

Scientific classification
- Kingdom: Plantae
- Clade: Tracheophytes
- Clade: Gymnosperms
- Division: Pinophyta
- Class: Pinopsida
- Order: Araucariales
- Family: Podocarpaceae
- Genus: Podocarpus
- Species: P. novae-caledoniae

Binomial name
- Podocarpus novae-caledoniae Vieill. ex Brongn. & Gris

Synonyms
- Nageia novae-caledoniae (Vieill. ex Brongn. & Gris) Kuntze; Podocarpus rivularis Pancher ex Brongn. & Gris

Species of plant

Podocarpus novae-caledoniae is a species of conifer in the family Podocarpaceae. It is endemic to the islands of Grande Terre and Île des Pins in New Caledonia.

== Habitat and ecology ==
This species is usually found along watercourses running through maquis shrublands.
