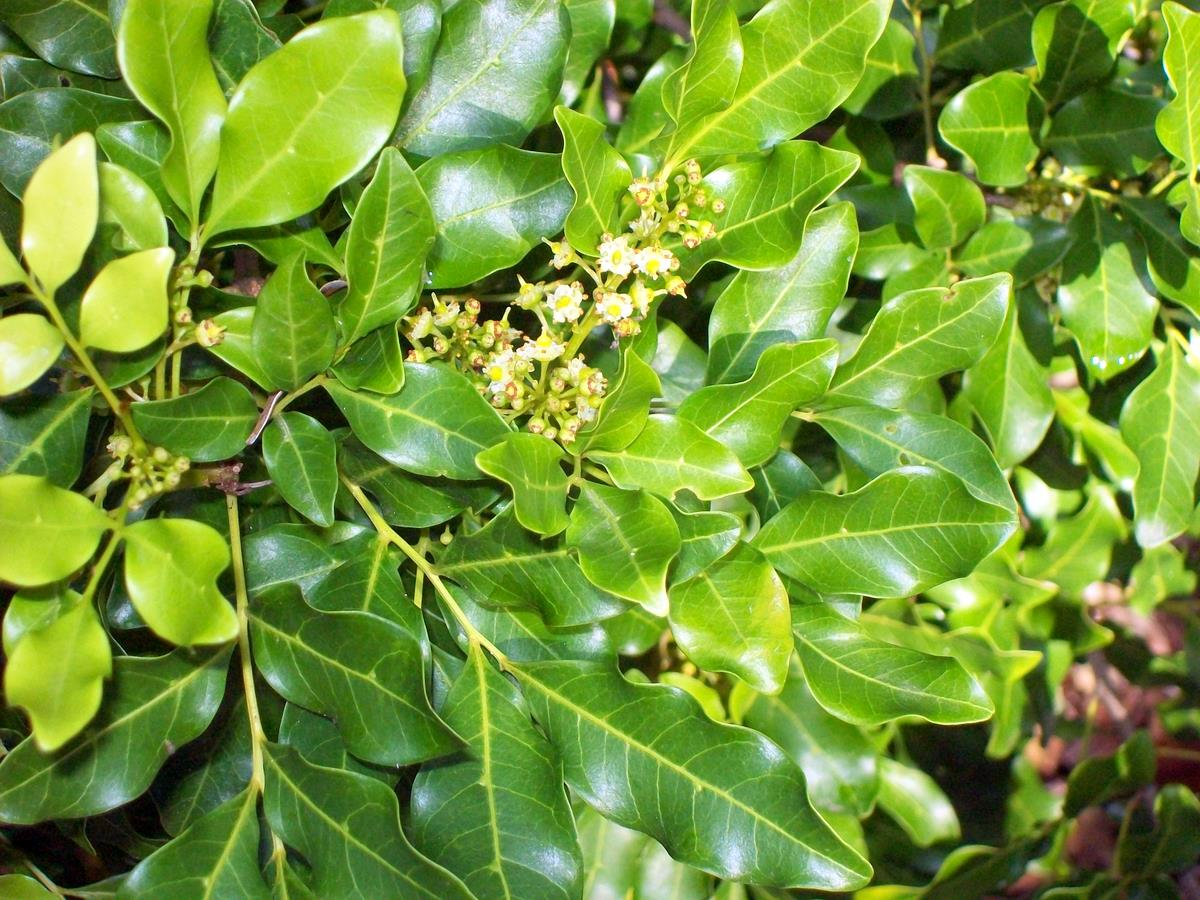
- Toechima tenax

Scientific classification
- Kingdom: Plantae
- Clade: Tracheophytes
- Clade: Angiosperms
- Clade: Eudicots
- Clade: Rosids
- Order: Sapindales
- Family: Sapindaceae
- Subfamily: Sapindoideae
- Genus: Toechima; Radlk.

Species
- See text

= Toechima =

Genus of trees

Toechima is a genus of small to medium-sized trees in the plant family Sapindaceae. The species are native to New South Wales, the Northern Territory and Queensland in Australia as well as New Guinea.

== Species ==
Eight species (including one undescribed) recognised by the Australian Plant Census and by the Census of Vascular Plants of Papua New Guinea are:

- Toechima daemelianum (F.Muell.) Radlk.
- Toechima dasyrrhache Radlk. - blunt-leaved steelwood
- Toechima erythrocarpum (F.Muell.) Radlk. - pink tamarind, foambark
  - Toechima erythrocarpum subsp. papuanum P.W.Leenhouts
- Toechima livescens Radlk
- Toechima monticola S.T.Reynolds
- Toechima pterocarpum S.T.Reynolds
- Toechima sp. East Alligator (J.Russell-Smith 8418) NT Herbarium
- Toechima tenax (Benth.) Radlk.
