= Pseudosphaerodon =

Pseudosphaerodon Temporal range: Early- Middle Eocene

Scientific classification
- Domain: Eukaryota
- Kingdom: Animalia
- Phylum: Chordata
- Class: Actinopterygii
- Order: Perciformes
- Genus: †Pseudosphaerodon; Noetling, 1885

Extinct genus of fishes

Pseudosphaerodon is an extinct genus of prehistoric Actinopterygii, or ray-finned fish, that lived from the early to middle Eocene.

== See also ==
- Prehistoric fish
- List of prehistoric bony fish
