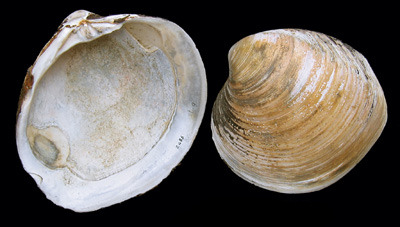
- Two valves of Arctica islandica

Scientific classification
- Kingdom: Animalia
- Phylum: Mollusca
- Class: Bivalvia
- Order: Venerida
- Superfamily: Arcticoidea
- Family: Arcticidae; Newton, 1891

Genera
- See text.

= Arcticidae =

Family of bivalves

The Arcticidae are a family of marine clams in the order Venerida. The only living species in the family is Arctica islandica. There are also many fossil species classified in a number of genera.
