= Archaehierax =

Archaehierax Temporal range: Late Oligocene, ~26–24 Ma

Scientific classification
- Kingdom: Animalia
- Phylum: Chordata
- Class: Aves
- Order: Accipitriformes
- Family: Accipitridae
- Subfamily: †Archaehieraxinae; Mather et al., 2022
- Genus: †Archaehierax; Mather et al., 2022
- Species: †A. sylvestris

Binomial name
- †Archaehierax sylvestris Mather et al., 2022

Extinct genus of birds

Archaehierax is an extinct genus of accipitrid that lived during the Chattian stage of the Oligocene epoch.

== Distribution ==
Archaehierax sylvestris is known from the Namba Formation of South Australia.
