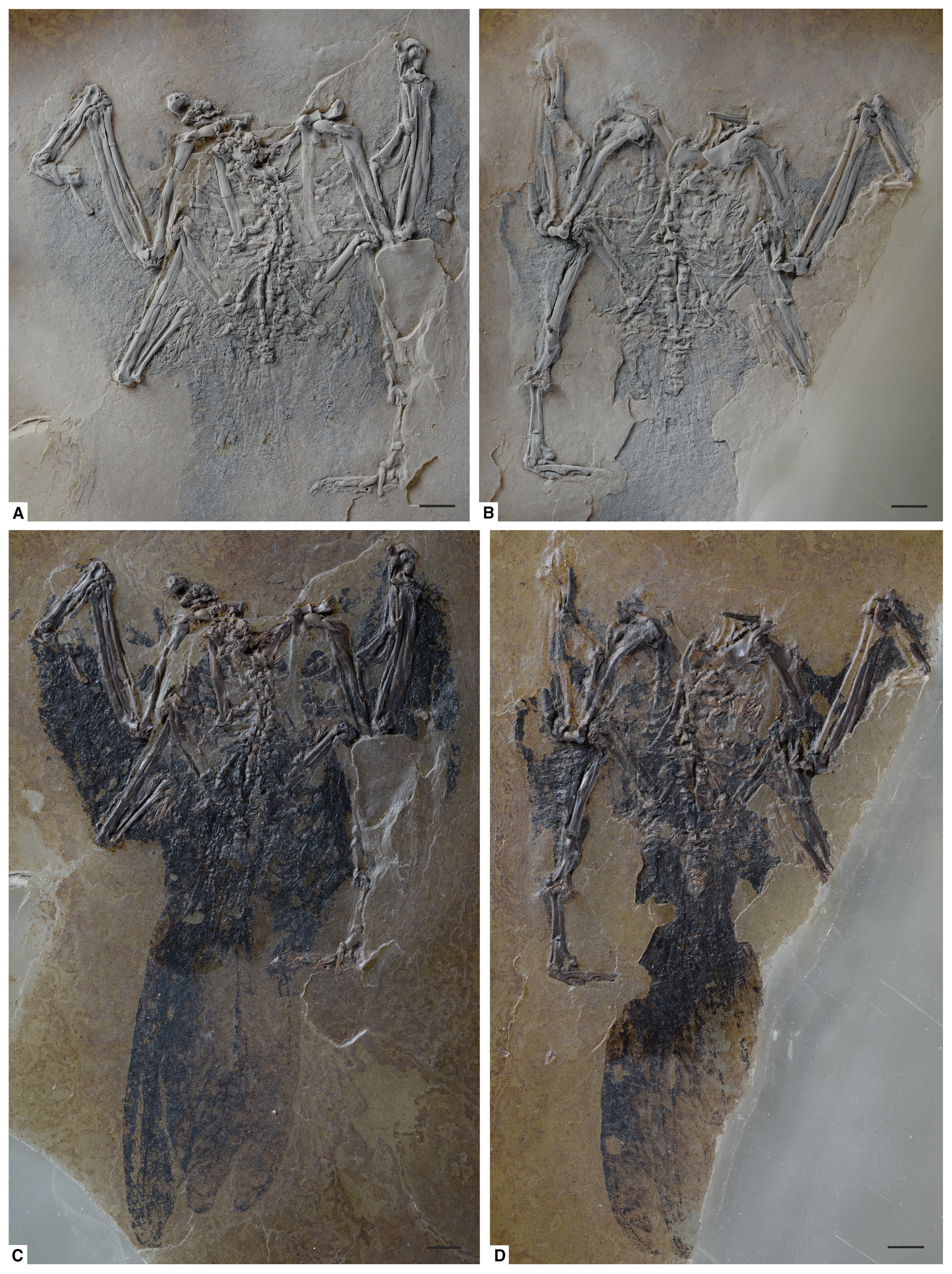
- Hassiavis cf. laticauda

Scientific classification
- Kingdom: Animalia
- Phylum: Chordata
- Class: Aves
- Clade: Strisores
- Family: †Archaeotrogonidae; Wetmore, 1926

Genera
- †Hassiavis Mayr 1998; †Archaeotrogon Milne-Edwards 1892; †Archaeodromus Mayr 2021

= Archaeotrogonidae =

Archaeotrogonidae Temporal range: Early Eocene–Early Oligocene

Extinct family of birds

Archaeotrogonidae is a prehistoric bird family known from the Eocene and Oligocene of Europe. They are members of Strisores, and are thought to be closely related to nightjars.

The remains of Archaeotrogon have been found in the Quercy Phosphorites of France, a geological formation containing Late Eocene and Early Oligocene deposits. They are primarily known from limb bones. Four species are presently considered valid.

The Middle Eocene Hassiavis, a more recently described bird from the famous Messel Pit in Germany, is also a member of the family. In 2021, a new genus, Archaeodromus was described from fossils found in the Early Eocene (Ypresian) aged London Clay, which are the oldest representatives of the family.

They were initially thought be prehistoric trogon. However, it is nowadays generally believed that they are not very closely related to these tropical forest birds of our time, but rather convergent. The Archaeotrogonidae actually seem to be Cypselomorphae and related to nightjars and hummingbirds, either as a basal lineage or as a distinct but entirely extinct family. The latter might be more justified than with other indeterminate Cretaceous and Paleogene modern birds: they are known from a time when the living cypselomorph families were already distinct, yet appears as well highly autapomorphic and the archaeotrogonid lineage seems to go as far back as that of nightjars for example. A 2021 phylogenetic analysis constrained to molecular results found them to be the sister group to nightjars.

== Taxonomy ==
†Archaeotrogonidae Wetmore 1926

- †Hassiavis laticauda Mayr 1998
- †Archaeotrogon Milne-Edwards 1892 (Late Eocene/Early Oligocene)
  - †A. nocturnus Mlíkovský 2002
  - †A. venustus Milne-Edwards 1892
  - †A. zitteli Gaillard 1908
  - †A. cayluxensis Gaillard 1908
  - †A. hoffstetteri Mourer-Chauviré 1980
- †Archaeodromus anglicus Mayr, 2021
