= Archaeodromus =

Archaeodromus Temporal range: Early Ypresian

Scientific classification
- Kingdom: Animalia
- Phylum: Chordata
- Class: Aves
- Family: †Archaeotrogonidae
- Genus: †Archaeodromus; Mayr, 2021
- Species: †A. anglicus

Binomial name
- †Archaeodromus anglicus Mayr, 2021

Extinct genus of birds

Archaeodromus anglicus is a species of prehistoric bird in the family Archaeotrogonidae, found in the Early Ypresian of the London Clay formation. It is the only species in the monotypic genus Archaeodromus. Both species and genus were described in 2021 by Gerald Mayr.
