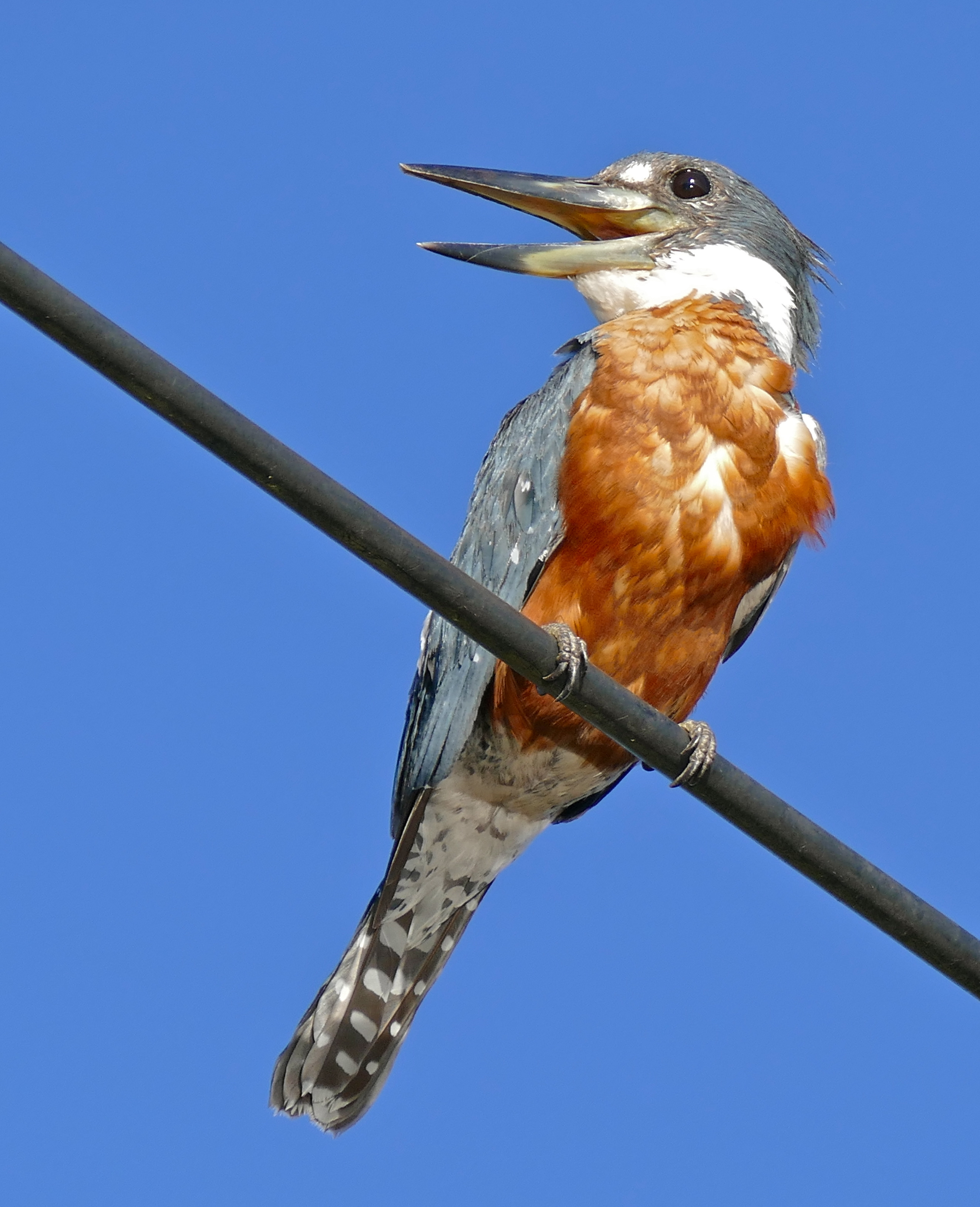
- Male perching on a pole, Brazil
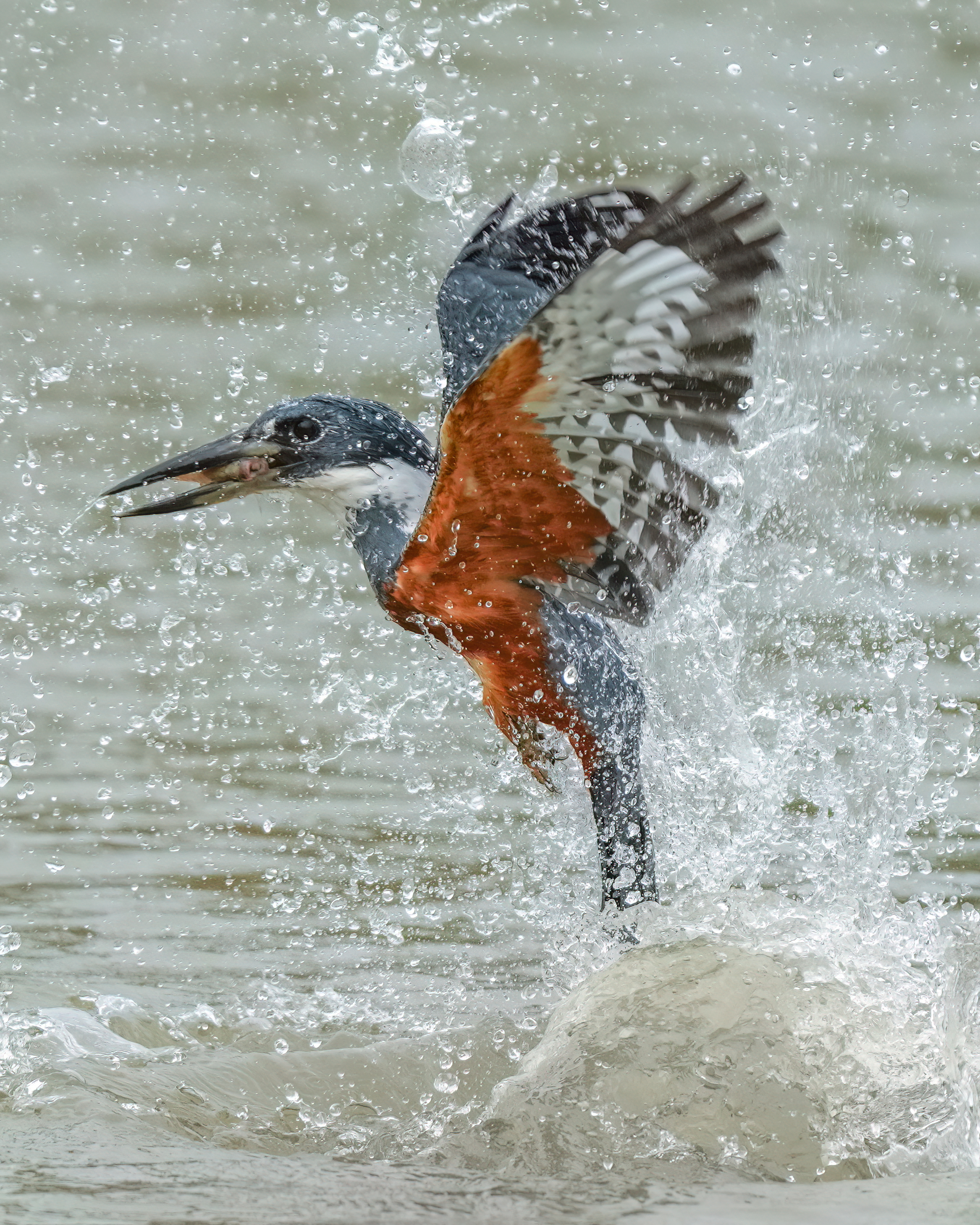
- Female in flight, emerging from water with a fish in its mouth, Brazil

Conservation status
- Least Concern (IUCN 3.1)

Scientific classification
- Kingdom: Animalia
- Phylum: Chordata
- Class: Aves
- Order: Coraciiformes
- Family: Alcedinidae
- Subfamily: Cerylinae
- Genus: Megaceryle
- Species: M. torquata

Binomial name
- Megaceryle torquata (Linnaeus, 1766)

Subspecies
- M. t. stictipennis - (Lawrence, 1885); M. t. torquata - (Linnaeus, 1766); M. t. stellata - (Meyen, 1834)

Synonyms
- Alcedo torquata Linnaeus, 1766; Ceryle torquata (Linnaeus, 1766)

= Ringed kingfisher =

Species of bird

The ringed kingfisher (Megaceryle torquata) is a large, conspicuous, and noisy kingfisher bird commonly found along the lower Rio Grande Valley in southeasternmost Texas in the United States through Central America to Tierra del Fuego in South America.

== Description ==
Megaceryle torquata is a Neotropical kingfisher that lives in habitats ranging between the US and Mexico. In 1888, the species was first discovered in the US, while the first ringed kingfisher nest was found in 1970. They are commonly seen along the Rio Grande and in water bodies in southern Texas. Their distribution is increasing and expanding northwards.

=== Measurement ===
The wings of adult males range between 184.9 and 211.1 mm (7.28 and 8.31 in), with an average of 196.3 mm (7.73 in). Their tails range from 110.0–129.0 mm (4.33–5.08 in), and their bills measure 74.9–94 mm (2.95–3.70 in). Female wings are from 185.0-210.1 mm, and their tails measure 111.5–132.1 mm (4.39–5.20 in) and possess bills measuring 75.9–90.9 mm (2.99–3.58 in). Individuals can weigh between 305 and 341 g (10.8 and 12.0 oz). Such measurements prove that the species do not differ sexually in terms of size.

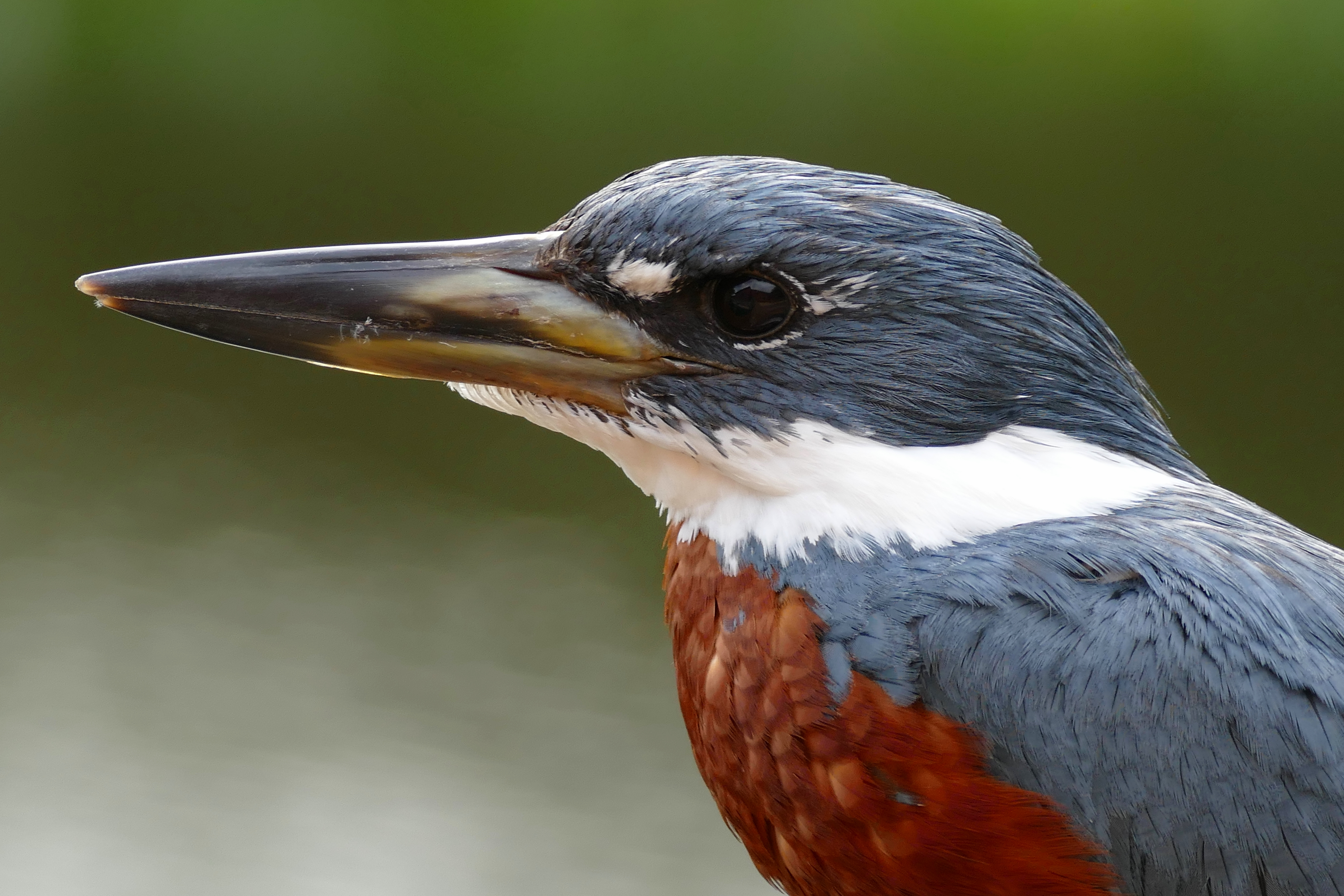
A closer look at the head of a male ringed kingfisher

=== Identification ===
Ringed kingfishers have dark-brown irises that are consistent among all age groups. They have straight bills that are longer than their heads, along with curved culmens and tomial serrations. The lower mandible appears to have some yellowish colorations. They possess syndactyl feet with olive-green or yellowish toes and black claws. A large crest appears between the base of their bills and necks. Several individuals have a white collar located around the neck.

=== Plumage ===
Each ringed kingfisher possesses 10 primary wings, 15 secondaries, three tertials, and 12 rectrices. They are rounded, and the tail is squared. Subspecies can be found in Texas, Mexico, Central America, and South America, due to slight plumage differences. Individuals themselves vary slightly as a result of variable environmental constraints and day-length regimes.

=== Sexual dimorphism ===
Ringed kingfishers can be identified by sex due to differences in coloration. The males possess rusty-brown underparts with white undertail coverts and a white throat. Females have a bluish-gray band seen on the upper breast and a whitish band.

=== Eggs ===
A ringed kingfisher's clutch size is typically three to six eggs, which are incubated for about 22 days.

== Taxonomy ==
The ringed kingfisher is from the family Alcedinidae in the order Coraciiformes. The ringed kingfisher is related to the belted kingfisher. Overall, the species appears much larger than its counterpart, while possessing a rufous belly, a massive bill, and a blue back.

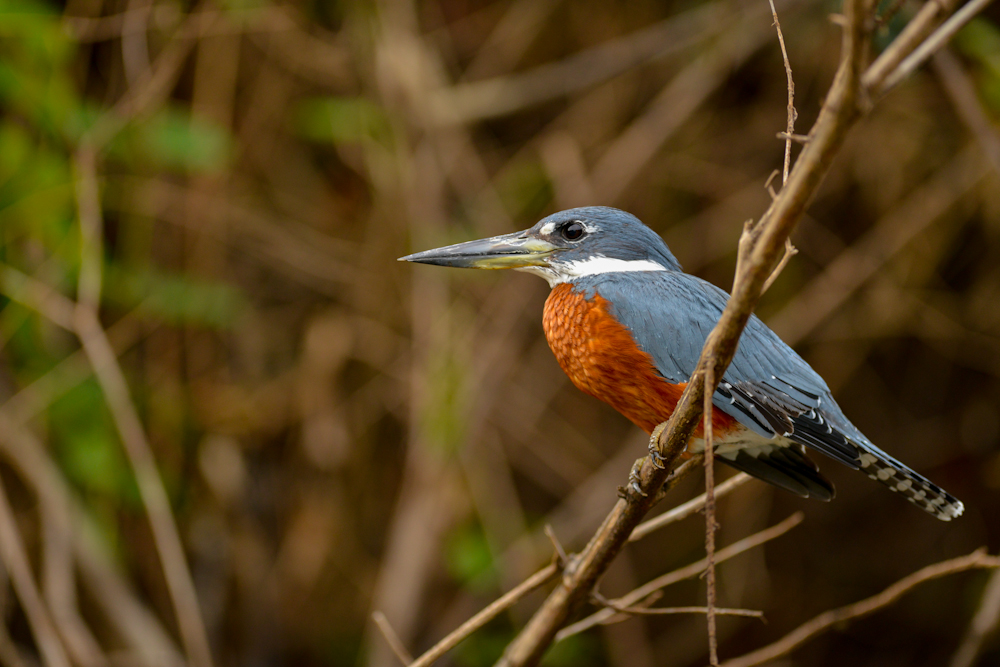
Male Kingfisher perching over a river to capture its prey

=== Subspecies ===
Three subspecies are identified by size and color, as well as location.

- M. t. torquata is found in regions of southern Texas and southern Sinaloa, Central America to South America, and throughout the Amazon basin, Argentina, and Uruguay, as well as Isla Margarita in Venezuela. Its undertail coverts are either fully white or spotted lightly with unmarked white underwing coverts for males, brown for females, and with a bill measuring more than 66 mm (2.6 in).
- M. t. stictipennis is found in the Lesser Antilles, Dominica, and Martinique. Individuals have secondary feathers with white spots that reach the outer part of the feathers. The dorsum appears to be darker blue or gray.
- M. t. stellate has breeding ranges and wintering grounds located in Chile and the southern part of Argentina. Its undertail coverts are spotted heavily with dark blue or gray coloration, with spotted or dusky underwing coverts, the dorm appears to be dark blue to gray, and the outer webs of its secondary wings do not appear to have white spots. Their bills measure less than 69 mm.

== Habitat and distribution ==
=== Habitat ===
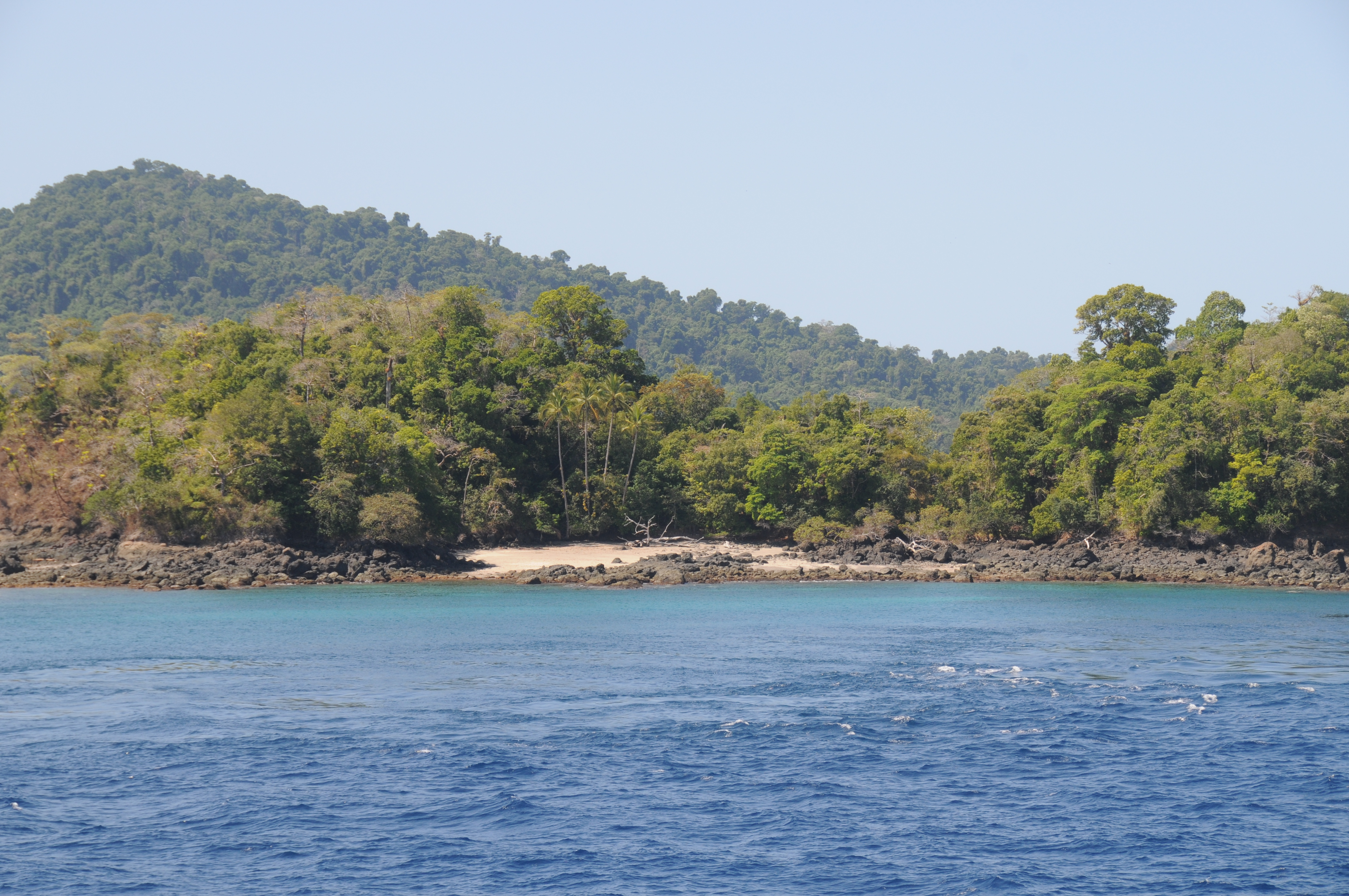
Coiba Island, an example of a preferred ringed kingfisher habitat

Ringed kingfishers are seen in freshwater habitats, tropical and temperate marine shorelines, and several islands, such as Coiba Island. Breeding occurs in aquatic regions with the support of aquatic animals, including fish-populated areas for nesting burrows. Nests can be found farther away from water. Habitats are near waterbodies that include streams, rivers, ponds, lakes, estuaries, and marine habitats. Habitats with clear water and less vegetation are preferred to easily access prey.

=== Distribution ===
Ringed kingfishers are found in broad areas between Texas, USA and South America. The ranges of ringed and belted kingfishers overlap from Central America and above for 6–8 months. Ringed kingfishers also have ranges that overlap with other kingfisher species in Central and South America. Breeding ranges of ringed kingfishers vary in the Neotropics in Mexico, the Caribbean, and South America. Their preference for mangrove habitats has been observed in the tropics. Foraging occurs offshore as far as 1 km (.7 mi). Overwintering ringed kingfishers are indifferent to breeding ranges, but are able to forage farther than during their breeding periods. Large irrigation canals in Rio Grande, Texas, have been used as wintering grounds by such species. They are usually found in areas with high fish densities during the dry season.

== Behavior ==
=== Locomotion ===
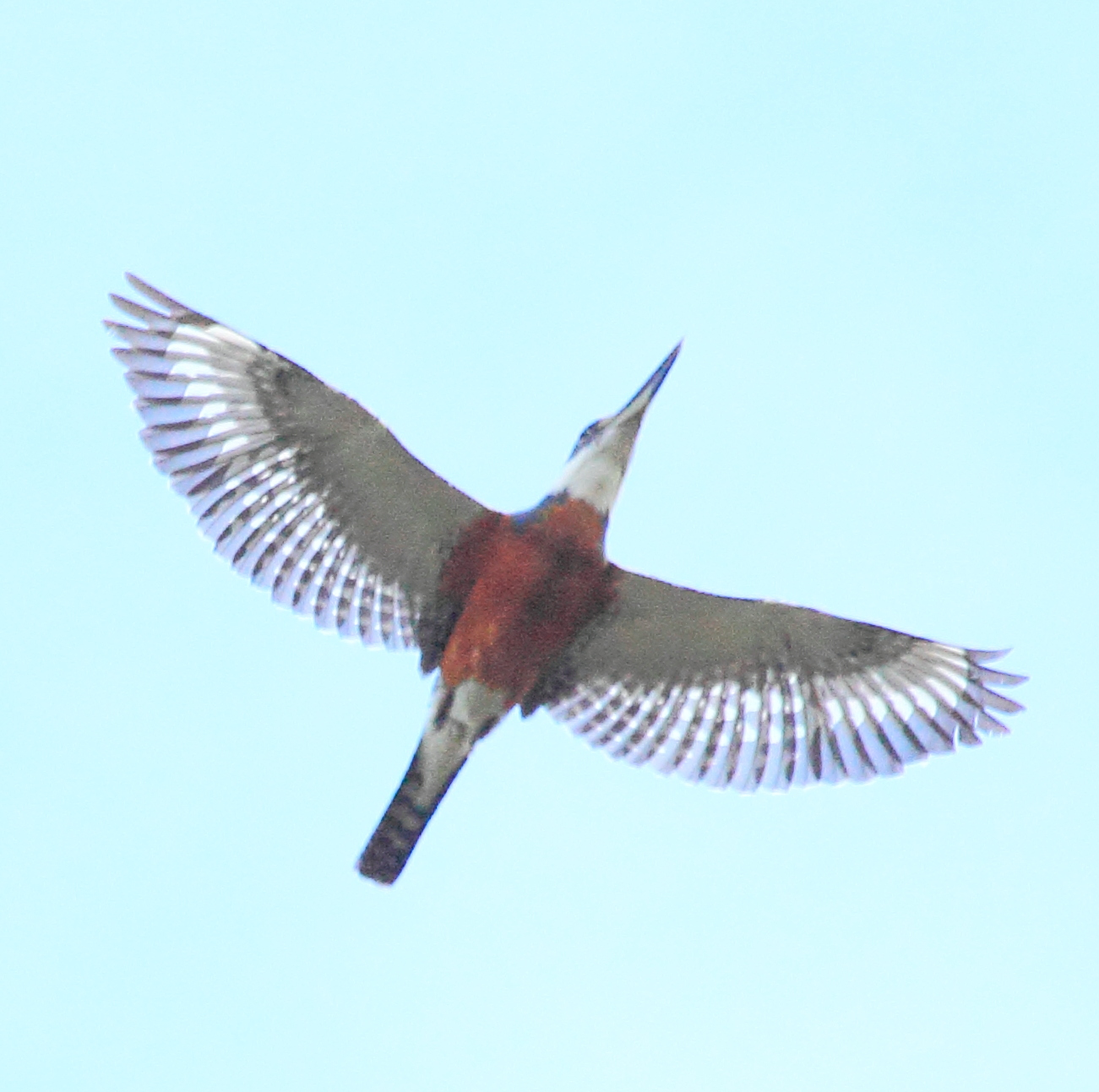
Ringed kingfisher flying with wings extended

The anatomy of ringed kingfishers prevents efficient terrestrial movements. Individuals shuffle into and out of nesting burrows, so displacing between branches is difficult for this species. They possess strong wings that beat very slowly as a result of their size. They are able to fly over land for long periods of time in comparison to other species of kingfishers.

=== Breeding ===
==== Mating ritual ====
A mating ritual involves the male ringed kingfisher offering fish to the female before copulation. The pair performs, wherein the male creates calls circling above the water, while dropping into the water. This process lasts for a short time.

==== Parental behavior ====
Female and male ringed kingfishers incubate their eggs while performing other duties equally. Short foraging breaks are taken during late afternoon since incubation periods are long. Each individual takes turns during the morning. Incubating birds are capable of finding prey by regurgitating their undigested food to attract flies in their burrows.

=== Vocalization ===
Ringed kingfishers have louder and lower-pitched calls compared to the belted kingfishers. Captured Juveniles have been heard screaming, giving a klek or kek call. The same call is heard during human intervention or other disturbances. A softer klek is produced by the adult to signal its incubating partner. Its common vocalizations are described as rattles.

=== Foraging behavior ===
Ringed kingfishers can perch for several hours on trees while watching for prey in fresh water. Belted kingfishers perch for only a few moments. Ringed kingfishers have also been observed to forage in marine water. They catch their prey by diving from a perch.

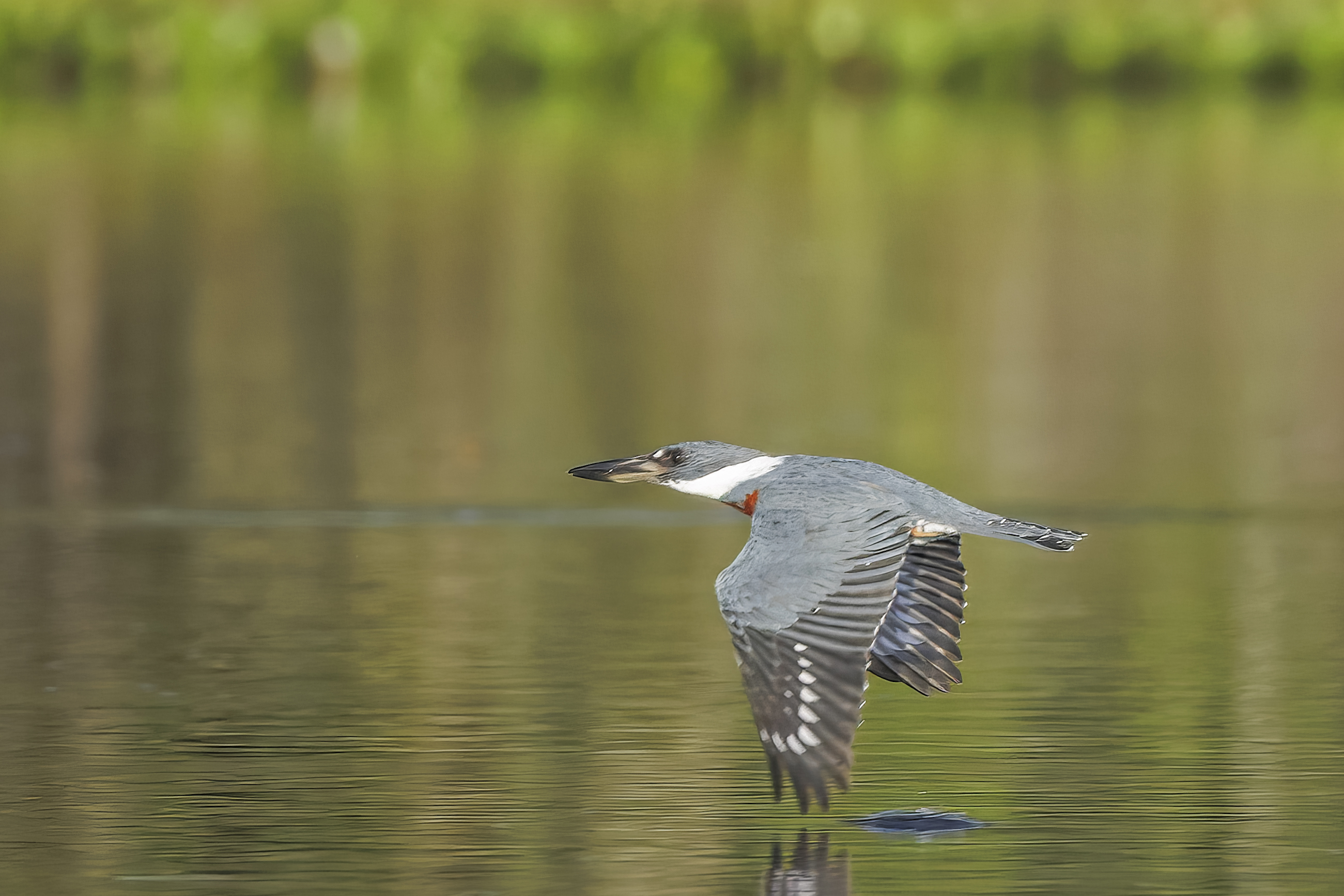
male, Ecuador

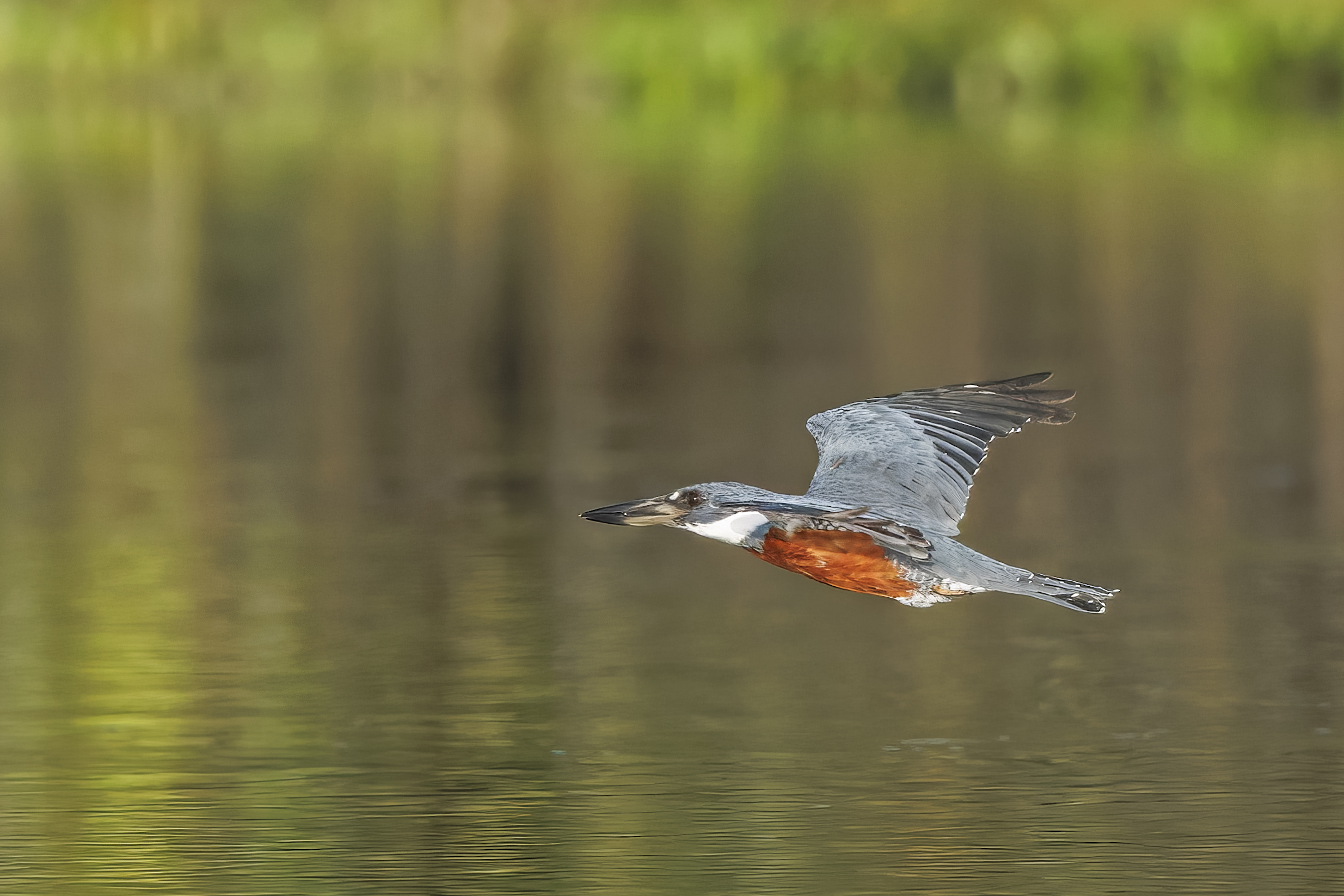
male

perched with fish, Brazil

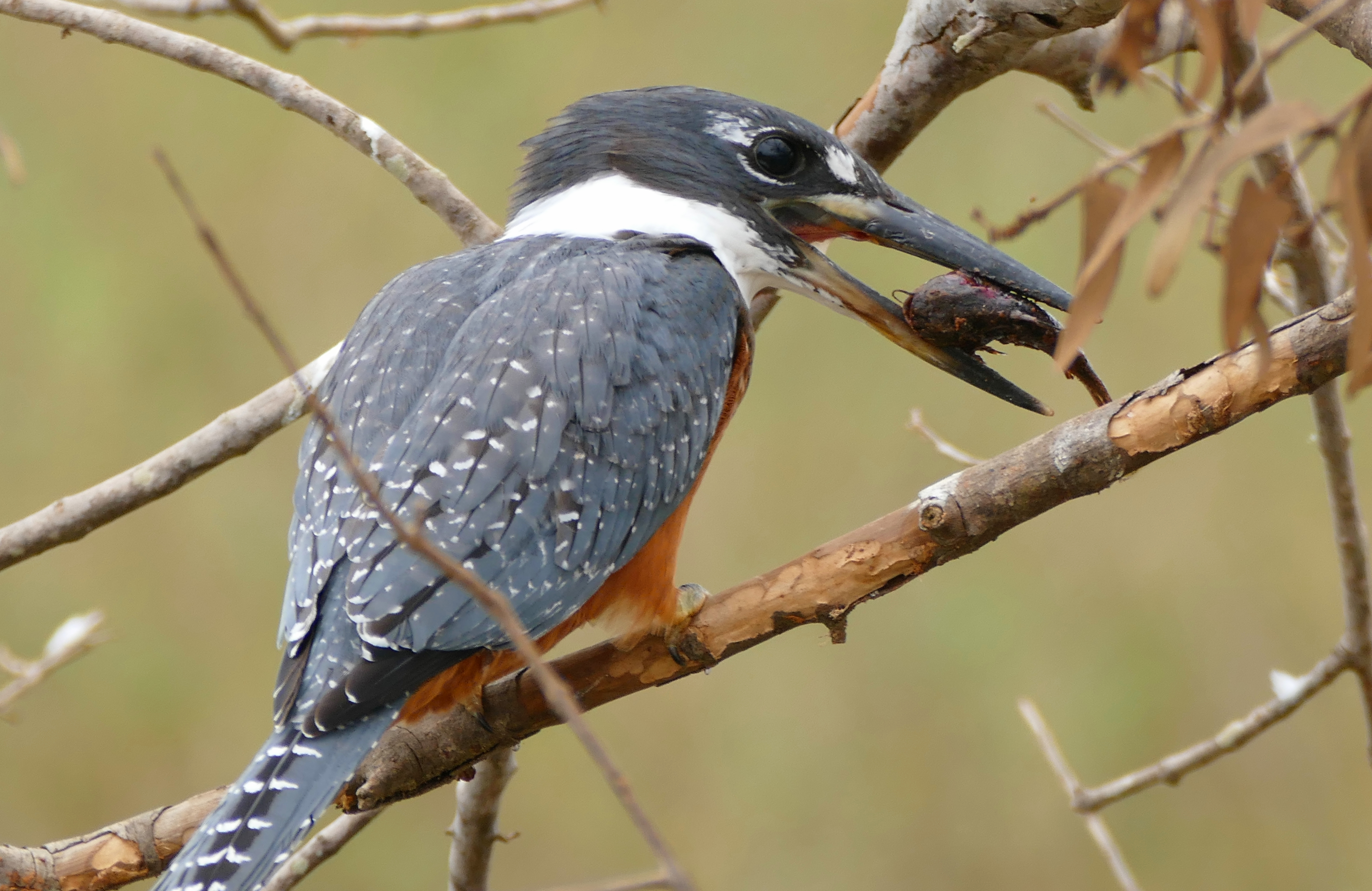
with armored catfish

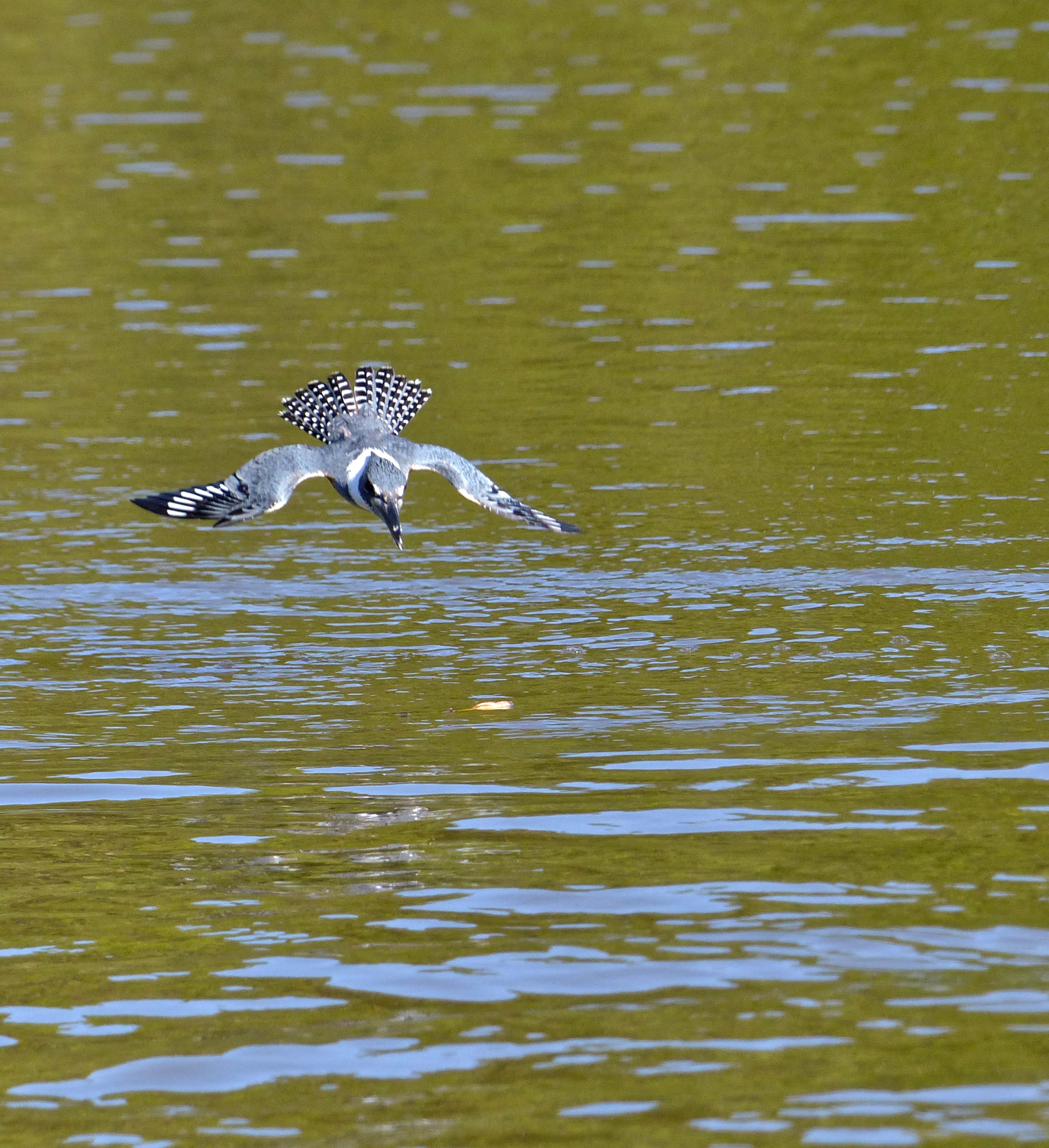
Female diving for hand-thrown fish

== Diet ==
The ringed kingfisher's diet is largely dependent on fish, but they sometimes target crabs and other crustaceans. Fish consumed include several species from the families Characidae and Cichlidae.

== Threats ==
=== Diseases ===
A parasitic infection caused by Pulchrosopa pulchrosopa, a type of flatworm, causes internal damage in the respiratory system of ringed kingfishers. Infected individuals were examined, with the species found in their lungs, tracheae, and coelomic cavities. The parasite migrates to the lungs as the host experiences stressful or immunosuppressive periods. The parasite also causes significant damage to tissues due to its migration to the lungs.

=== Predation ===
Predators of ringed kingfishers include the white-tailed hawk, sharp-shinned hawk, bald eagle, golden eagle, and peregrine falcon.

== Conservation status ==
The IUCN considers the ringed kingfisher to be of least concern. Increasing population trends indicate that the species is not vulnerable, as it is widespread and has a large habitat distribution and breeding ranges.

== See also ==
- List of birds of South America
- Belted kingfisher — closely related bird which ranges as far north as Alaska
