= Palaeogeranos =

Palaeogeranos Temporal range: Early Oligocene

Scientific classification
- Kingdom: Animalia
- Phylum: Chordata
- Class: Aves
- Order: Gruiformes
- Genus: †Palaeogeranos
- Species: †P. tourmenti

Binomial name
- †Palaeogeranos tourmenti Louchart & Duhamel, 2021

Extinct genus of birds

Palaeogeranos is an extinct genus of bird that lived during the Rupelian stage of the Oligocene epoch.

== Distribution ==
Palaeogeranos tourmenti is known from the Calcaires de Campagne-Calavon of France.
