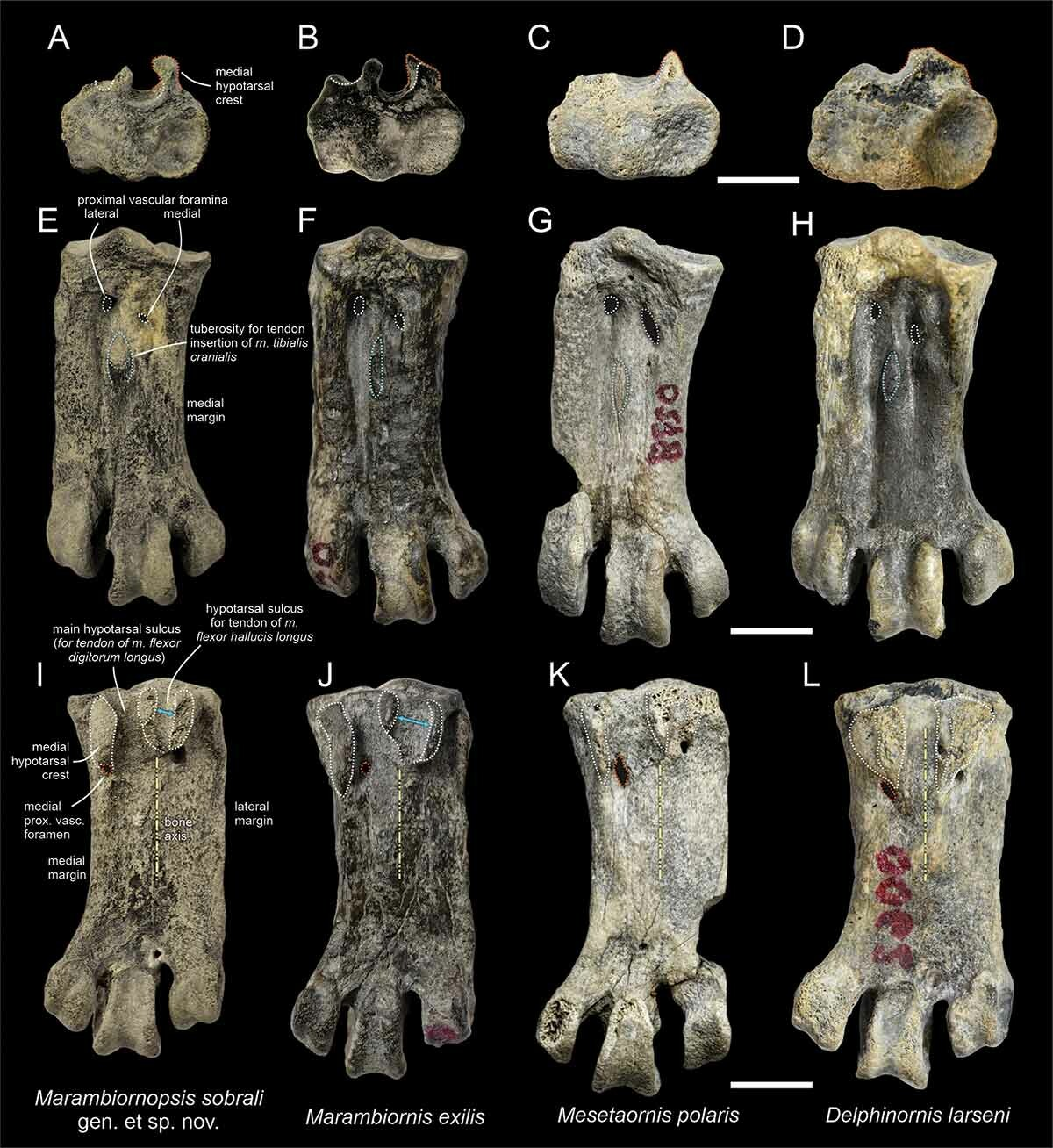
- Holotype fossils

Scientific classification
- Domain: Eukaryota
- Kingdom: Animalia
- Phylum: Chordata
- Class: Aves
- Order: Sphenisciformes
- Family: Spheniscidae
- Genus: †Marambiornopsis
- Species: †M. sobrali

Binomial name
- †Marambiornopsis sobrali Jadwiszczak et al., 2021

= Marambiornopsis =

Extinct penguin

Marambiornopsis is an extinct genus of Eocene penguin known from the Submeseta Formation in Antarctica. It contains one species, M. sobrali.

== Discovery ==
The fossils were found during two joined Argentine and Swedish expeditions between February 2011 to February 2012 to the Submeseta Formation, which were later stored in the fossil collections by the staff of the Swedish Museum of Natural History in Stockholm.

== Etymology ==
The genus Marambiornopsis is named after another already-existing genus Marambiornis, combined with the Greek word ópsis, which in this case was used for "appearance". The specific names was in honor of Argentine geologist and Navy Sub-Lieutenant José María Sobral, who also found the first antarctic penguin fossils.
