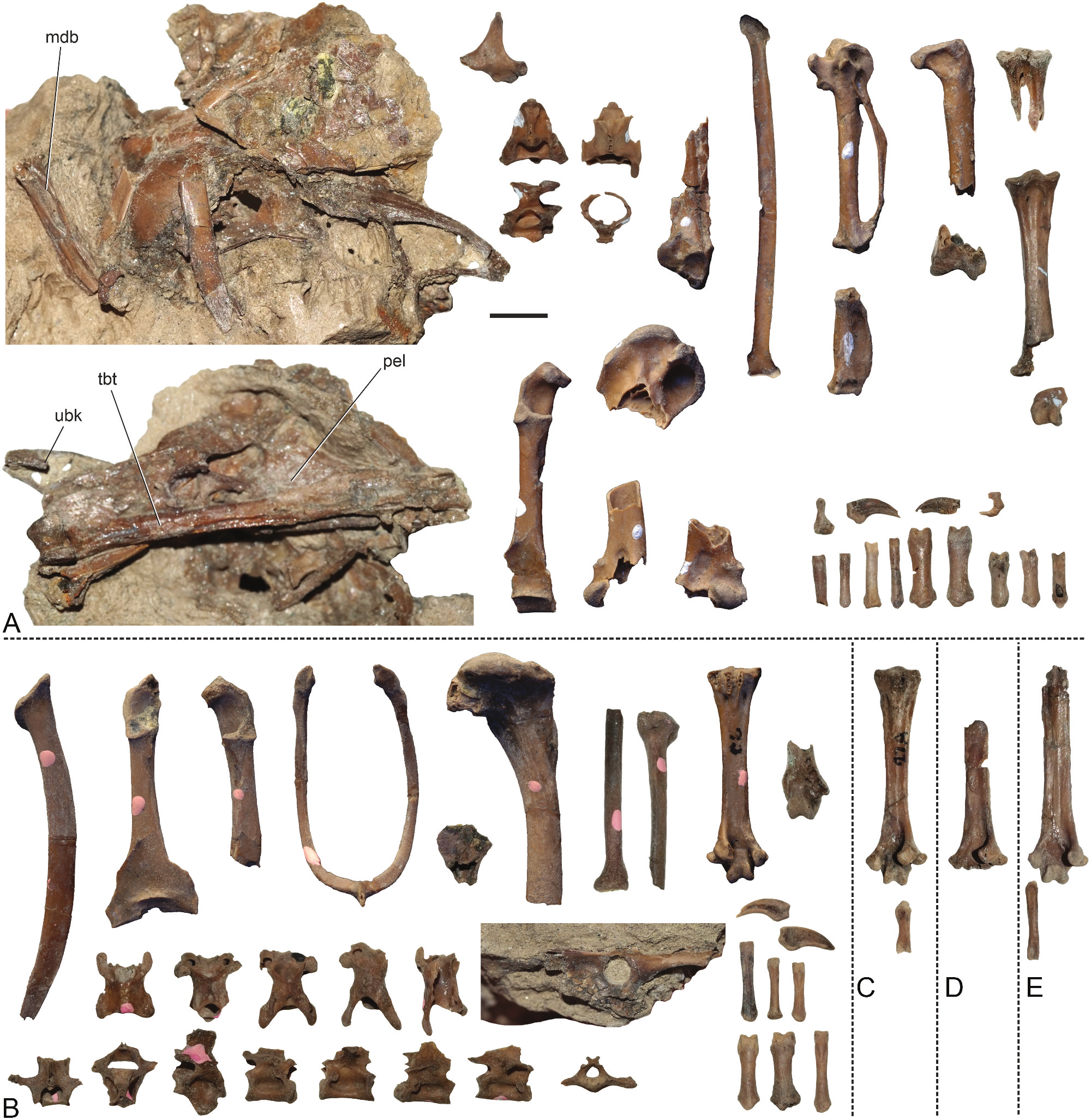
- Holotype fossil elements of Psittacomimus

Scientific classification
- Kingdom: Animalia
- Phylum: Chordata
- Class: Aves
- Clade: Passerimorphae
- Family: †Psittacopedidae
- Genus: †Psittacomimus; Mayr & Kitchener, 2022
- Species: †P. eos

Binomial name
- †Psittacomimus eos Mayr & Kitchener, 2022

= Psittacomimus =

Psittacomimus Temporal range: early Eocene, 54.6–55 Ma

Extinct genus of psittacopedid birds

Psittacomimus (meaning "Psittacus imitator") is an extinct genus of psittacopedid bird from the Early Eocene London Clay Formation of Essex, United Kingdom. The genus contains a single species, P. eos, known from a partial skeleton.

== Discovery and naming ==
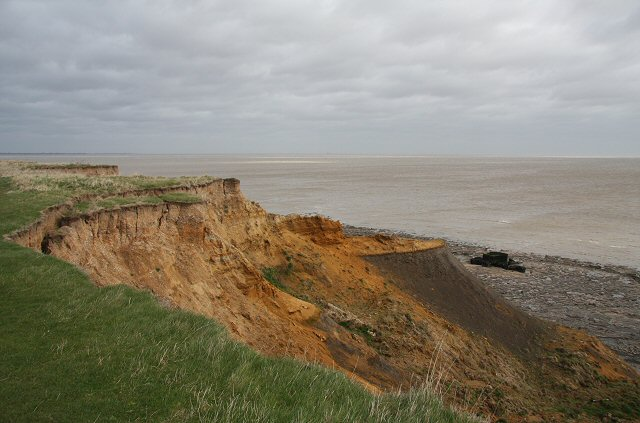
Cliffs near the type locality

The holotype specimen, NMS.Z.2021.40.38, was discovered in 1991 by Michael Daniels in layers of the London Clay Formation (Walton Member), dated to the early Ypresian, which is located near Walton-on-the-Naze in Essex, England. This specimen consists of the skull, the left quadrate, several vertebrae, the left coracoid, a partial left and right humerus, a partial left ulna, a right radius, a right and partial left carpometacarpus, the pelvis, a partial right femur, a right tibiotarsus, a partial left and right tarsometatarsus, and pedal phalanges.

The fossil material, particularly the nearly-complete skull, closely resembles bones of the contemporary related Parapsittacopes.

A preliminary description of the fossil material was published by German paleontologist Gerald Mayr and Michael Daniels in 1998. In 2022, Gerald Mayr and British zoologist Andrew C. Kitchener described Psittacomimus eos, a new genus and species of psittacopedid, based on these fossil remains. The generic name, "Psittacomimus", combines the Greek word "μῖμος" ("mimos"), meaning "imitator", with the name of the extant parrot Psittacus, in reference to the similarity of Psittacomimus with psittaciforms. The specific name, "eos", references the discovery of the fossils in Eocene-aged sediments. Additional bones discovered at the same locality were also assigned to Psittacomimus as referred specimens.

== Classification ==
Mayr and Kitchener (2022) recovered Psittacomimus within the Psittacopedidae in their phylogenetic analyses. Their results are shown in the cladogram below:

- Psittacopasseres
  - - - Psittacidae
      - †Quercypsitta
    - - †Eofringillirostrum
      - - - †Pseudasturides
          - - †Cyrilavis
            - - †Serudaptus
              - - †Messelastur
                - †Tynskya
        - - †Pumiliornis
          - †Psittacopes
          - †Morsoravis
          - - †Parapsittacopes
            - †Psittacomimus
          - - †Minutornis
            - Parapasseres

== See also ==
- Paleobiota of the London Clay
