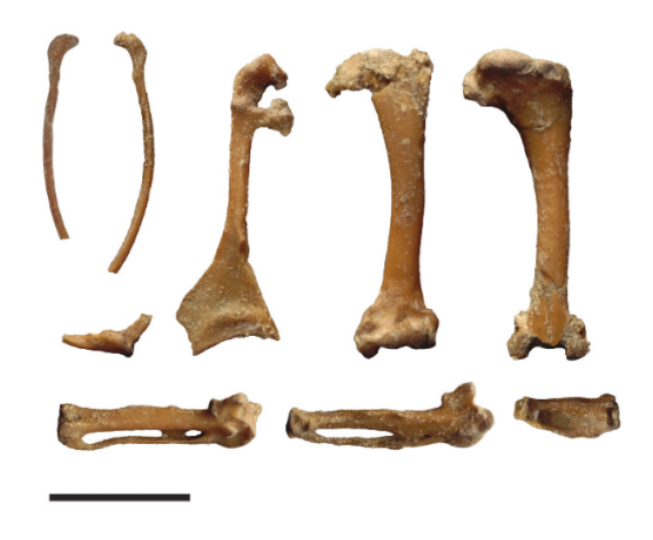
- Holotype fossil elements of Minutornis

Scientific classification
- Kingdom: Animalia
- Phylum: Chordata
- Class: Aves
- Clade: Psittacopasseres
- Clade: †Parapasseres
- Family: †incertae sedis
- Genus: †Minutornis; Mayr & Kitchener, 2022
- Species: †M. primoscenoides

Binomial name
- †Minutornis primoscenoides Mayr & Kitchener, 2022

= Minutornis =

Minutornis Temporal range: early Eocene, 54.6–55 Ma

Extinct genus of parapasserine birds

Minutornis (meaning "tiny bird") is an extinct genus of parapasserine bird from the Early Eocene London Clay Formation of Essex, United Kingdom. The genus contains a single species, M. primoscenoides, known from a fragmentary skeleton.

== Discovery and naming ==
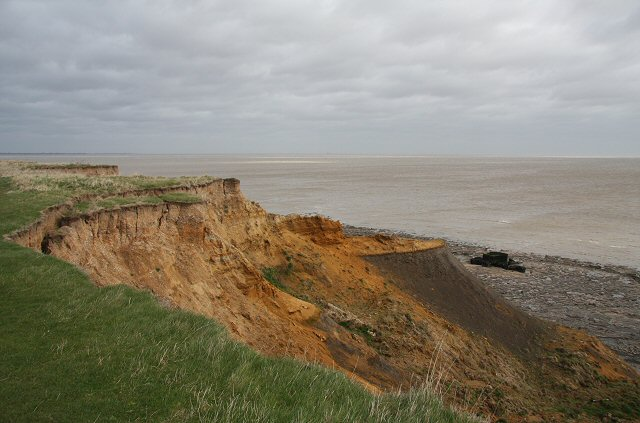
Cliffs near the type locality

The holotype specimen, NMS.Z.2021.40.62, was discovered in 1987 by Michael Daniels in layers of the London Clay Formation (Walton Member), dated to the early Ypresian, which is located near Walton-on-the-Naze in Essex, England. This specimen consists of the left coracoid, a fragmentary furcula, a partial sternum, left and right humeri, left and right carpometacarpi, and a wing phalanx.

In 1998, German paleontologist Gerald Mayr incorrectly assigned the fossil material to Primoscens minutus. In 2022, Gerald Mayr and British zoologist Andrew C. Kitchener described Minutornis primoscenoides, a new genus and species of parapasserine, based on these fossil remains. The generic name, "Minutornis", combines the Latin word "minutus", meaning "tiny" with the Greek word "ornis", meaning "bird". The specific name, "primoscenoides", references the extinct bird Primoscens which shares some anatomical similarities. It also references the fact that the fossil material was initially described as belonging to Primoscens.

== Classification ==
Mayr and Kitchener (2022) recovered Minutornis as closely related to the Parapasseres, which is the clade containing zygodactylids and crown group Passeriformes, in their phylogenetic analyses. In their description of the new genus and species they placed Minutornis in Parapasseres incertae sedis. Their results are shown in the cladogram below:

- Psittacopasseres
  - - - Psittacidae
      - †Quercypsitta
    - - †Eofringillirostrum
      - - - †Pseudasturides
          - - †Cyrilavis
            - - †Serudaptus
              - - †Messelastur
                - †Tynskya
        - - †Pumiliornis
          - †Psittacopes
          - †Morsoravis
          - - †Parapsittacopes
            - †Psittacomimus
          - - †Minutornis
            - Parapasseres

== See also ==
- Paleobiota of the London Clay
