= Sororavis =

Sororavis Temporal range: 55–54.6 Ma Early Eocene

Scientific classification
- Kingdom: Animalia
- Phylum: Chordata
- Class: Aves
- Family: †Morsoravidae
- Genus: †Sororavis; Mayr & Kitchener, 2023
- Species: †S. solitarius

Binomial name
- †Sororavis solitarius (Mayr & Kitchener, 2023)

Extinct genus of birds

Sororavis is an extinct genus of bird from the Early Eocene London Clay of Walton-on-the-Naze, United Kingdom. It contains a single named species, Sororavis solitarius. It is a member of the Morsoravidae.

== Discovery and naming ==
The holotype of Sororavis, NMS.Z.2021.40.75, was discovered in 1986 by the late Michael Daniels, a fossil collector who also collected other specimens of Early Eocene zygodactyl birds and numerous other birds. The fossil was collected from the Walton Member of the London Clay, of lower Ypresian age (between 54.6 and 55 million years old), near the town of Walton-on-the-Naze. It consists of the tip of an upper beak, fragments of the mandible, the coracoids, parts of the furcula and sternum, portions of the humeri and an ulna, portions of the tibiotarsi and tarsometatarsi, and several phalanges.

Mayr & Kitchener (2023) named the new genus and species Sororavis solitarius based on these remains, also erecting the new family Morsoravidae including the genus. The generic name Sororavis is from Latin soror, meaning "sister", and avis, meaning "bird", in reference to the closeness of Sororavis to Morsoravis. The names are intended to sound similar. The specific ephitet solitarius is from Latin solitaries, meaning "single", and is based on the presence of only one specimen of Sororavis in Michael Daniels' large collection of bird fossils.

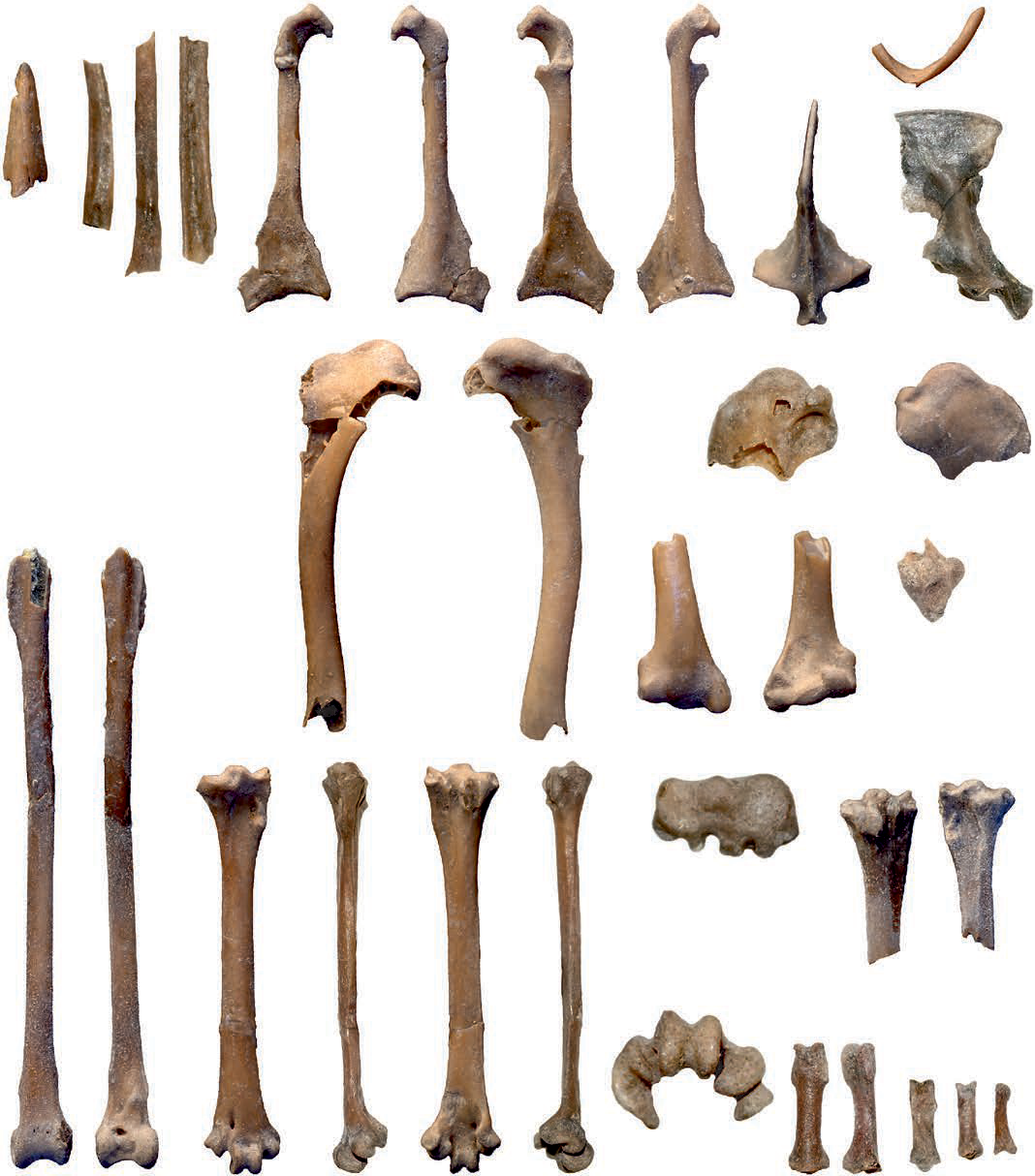
The fossil bones of the holotype of Sororavis solitarius

== Description ==
Sororavis was a bird of similar size to Morsoravis sedilis, but larger than another related bird, Pumiliornis tessellatus. The beak is similar to that of Morsoravis, and resembles that of thrushes in shape. Its tip is narrow and pointed. The coracoid is similar in proportions to that of Psittacopedidae and extant songbirds. There was a long procoracoid process but no foramen for the supracoracoid nerve. The pneumatic fossa of the humerus lacks pneumatic openings, possibly related to the presence of pleurocoelous vertebra. The tibiotarsus is very long and slender, and the tarsometatarsus is longer and narrower than that found in relatives of Sororavis. It has a flattened shape. The trochlea of the fourth metatarsal is deflected downwards and has a flange that is indicative of a zygodactyl foot arrangement.

== Classification ==
Sororavis is a member of the Morsoravidae, a family also including such birds as Morsoravis and Pumiliornis. This family has only been formally described from fossils discovered in Europe, but it is also thought to have been present in North America, on the basis of a bird fossil from the Green River Formation of the western United States. The precise position of the Morsoravidae is not clear. Mayr & Kitchener (2023), in an analysis including Sororavis recovered the morsoravids as the sister taxon to a clade including the songbirds and the Zygodactylidae, as per the simplified cladogram:

- - - Psittaciformes
    - †Quercypsitta
  - - - - Passeriformes
        - †Zygodactylus
        - †Primozygodactylus
        - †Primoscens
        - †Minutornis
      - - †Pumiliornis
        - †Morsoravis
        - †Sororavis
    - †Psittacopes
    - - †Parapsittacopes
      - †Psittacomimmus
  - †Eofringillirostrum
  - †Pseudasturides
  - †Cyrilavis
  - †Serudaptus
  - - †Messelastur
    - †Tynskya

== Paleobiology ==
Sororavis, like other Morsoravidae, has a distinctive morphology of the tarsometatarsus, including facilities for a foot that was at least semi-zygodactyl. The tarsometatarsus is generally similar to that of the mousebirds, and the tibiotarsus is also similar in its dimensions. Sororavis might have been able to hang and dangle from branches in order to better access food, like fruits or flowers. The related taxon Pumiliornis has been found with pollen fossilised in its gut, indicating that it probably ate nectar. Sororavis could have been a small, arboreal, and acrobatic bird, living much lke modern mousebirds.
