= 2016 in archosaur paleontology =

This archosaur paleontology list records new fossil archosauriform taxa that were described during the year 2016, as well as notes other significant Archosaur paleontology discoveries and events which occurred during the year.

== Basal archosauriforms ==
Name	Novelty	Status	Authors	Age	Unit	Location	Notes	Images
Litorosuchus	Gen. et sp. nov	Valid	Li et al.	Middle Triassic	Falang Formation	China	Probably a relative of Vancleavea. The type species is L. somnii.	
Triopticus	Gen. et sp. nov	Valid	Stocker et al.	Late Triassic (latest Carnian-early Norian)	Dockum Group	United States (Texas)	Probably a basal member of Archosauriformes. The type species is T. primus.	

=== Basal archosauriform research ===
- A study on the resting metabolic rate of 14 taxa of fossil archosauromorph reptiles as indicated by bone histology is published by Legendre et al. (2016).
- A study of the phylogenetic relationships of the archosauriforms traditionally assigned to the family Euparkeriidae is published by Sookias (2016).
- A redescription of the braincase and the inner ear of Euparkeria capensis is published by Sobral et al. (2016).
- A study of the phylogenetic relationships of archosauromorph reptiles, with an emphasis on the phylogenetic relationships of proterosuchids and erythrosuchids, is published by Ezcurra (2016).
- A study on the patterns of morphological diversity of the skulls of late Permian to Early Jurassic archosauromorph reptiles is published by Foth et al. (2016).
- A study on the braincase anatomy of the type specimens of Pseudochampsa ischigualastensis and Tropidosuchus romeri is published by Trotteyn & Paulina-Carabajal (2016).
- A reevaluation of the neotype specimen of Parasuchus hislopi and a study of the phylogenetic relationships of the species is published by Kammerer et al. (2016), who consider the genus Parasuchus to be a senior synonym of the genera Paleorhinus and Arganarhinus, and refer the species Paleorhinus bransoni Williston (1904), Francosuchus angustifrons Kuhn (1936) and Paleorhinus magnoculus Dutuit (1977) to the genus Parasuchus.
- A study on the endocranial anatomy (including the brain, inner ear, neurovascular structures and sinus systems) of Parasuchus angustifrons and Ebrachosuchus neukami is published by Lautenschlager & Butler (2016).

== Pseudosuchians ==
=== Research ===
- A study of the skull anatomy of the ornithosuchid Riojasuchus tenuisceps is published by von Baczko & Desojo (2016).
- A restudy of Dasygnathoides longidens and Ornithosuchus woodwardi, rejecting their synonymy, is published by von Baczko & Ezcurra (2016).
- A study on the cranial anatomy and phylogenetic relationships of the aetosaur Paratypothorax andressorum is published by Schoch & Desojo (2016).
- New fossil material from the Triassic (Ladinian or earliest Carnian) Pinheiros-Chiniquá Sequence of the Santa Maria Supersequence in Brazil attributed to the rauisuchian species Prestosuchus chiniquensis is described by Lacerda et al. (2016).
- A study on the presence, size, shape, and position of the subnarial foramen (an opening located between premaxilla and maxilla) in Prestosuchus chiniquensis and its implication for archosaurian phylogeny is published by Roberto-da-Silva et al. (2016).
- A redescription of the fossil material assignable to the species Trialestes romeri and a study of the phylogenetic relationships of the species is published by Lecuona, Ezcurra & Irmis (2016).
- The osteological description of Carnufex carolinensis and a study of its phylogenetic position is published by Drymala & Zanno (2016).
- A study on the changes of crocodyliform biodiversity through the Jurassic/Cretaceous transition and on probable causes of the decline of some crocodyliform lineages at this time is published by Tennant, Mannion & Upchurch (2016).
- Description of postcranial skeletons of three specimens of the sphagesaurid Caipirasuchus (representing Caipirasuchus montealtensis, Caipirasuchus paulistanus and Caipirasuchus sp.) is published by Iori, Carvalho & Marinho (2016).
- Description of the postcranial elements of the skeleton of Pissarrachampsa sera is published by Godoy et al. (2016).
- Description of new cranial remains of Pholidosaurus purbeckensis from the Early Cretaceous (Berriasian) of France and a study of phylogenetic relationships of the species is published by Martin, Raslan-Loubatié & Mazin (2016).
- Fossils of the dyrosaurid crocodylomorph Hyposaurus are described from the Late Cretaceous Shendi Formation of Sudan by Salih et al. (2016).
- A description of the endocranial anatomy of Steneosaurus is published by Brusatte et al. (2016).
- A study on the body proportions and body size of teleosaurids is published by Young et al. (2016).
- Fossils of teleosauroid thalattosuchians, including a close relative of Lemmysuchus and Machimosaurus, are described from the Middle Jurassic (Bathonian) of Morocco by Jouve et al. (2016), who name a new tribe Machimosaurini.
- A redescription of the holotype specimen of the metriorhynchid species "Plesiosaurus" mexicanus Wieland (1910) is published by Barrientos-Lara et al. (2016), who transfer the species to the genus Torvoneustes.
- New goniopholidid specimen belonging or related to the species Goniopholis lucasii / Amphicotylus lucasii, representing a single individual rather than a composite of unassociated elements, is described from the Upper Jurassic Morrison Formation (Wyoming, United States) by Erickson (2016).
- A Middle Jurassic dentary from the Isle of Skye, Scotland, United Kingdom, referred to Theriosuchus sp., is described by Young et al. (2016).
- A histological study of a specimen of Susisuchus anatoceps is published by Sayão et al. (2016).
- New fossil material of Allodaposuchus precedens is described from the Late Cretaceous of France by Martin et al. (2016).
- Fossil mekosuchine vertebrae, tentatively assigned to Mekosuchus whitehunterensis, are described from Riversleigh (Australia) by Stein, Archer & Hand (2016), who interpret them as confirming that even adult specimens of this species were smaller in snout-vent length than adults of extant small crocodilian species belonging to the genera Paleosuchus and Osteolaemus, and indicating that this species employed feeding behaviours that were unusual for crocodilians.
- Partial skeleton of the Chinese alligator is described from the late Pliocene of western Japan by Iijima, Takahashi & Kobayashi (2016).
- A study on the osteology of alligator fossils from the late Miocene Moss Acres Racetrack locality in Marion County, Florida and the phylogenetic placement of the alligators these fossils belonged to within the genus Alligator is published by Whiting, Steadman & Vliet (2016).
- New information on the anatomy of Globidentosuchus brachyrostris and Centenariosuchus gilmorei and a study of the phylogenetic relationships of these species is published by Hastings, Reisser & Scheyer (2016).

=== New taxa ===
Name	Novelty	Status	Authors	Age	Unit	Location	Notes	Images
Agaresuchus	Gen. et sp. et comb. nov	Valid	Narváez et al.	Late Cretaceous (late Campanian–Maastrichtian)	Tremp Formation	Spain	A member of Allodaposuchidae. Genus includes new species Agaresuchus fontisensis, as well as "Allodaposuchus" subjuniperus.	A. fontisensis
Bayomesasuchus	Gen. et sp. nov	Valid	Barrios, Paulina-Carabajal & Bona	Late Cretaceous	Cerro Lisandro Formation	Argentina	A peirosaurid crocodyliform. The type species is Bayomesasuchus hernandezi.	
Elosuchus broinae	Sp. nov	Valid	Meunier & Larsson	Late Cretaceous (Cenomanian)		Algeria		
Fortignathus	Gen. et comb. nov	Valid	Young et al.	Cretaceous (late Albian-early Cenomanian)	Echkar Formation	Niger	A itasuchid or a relative of itasuchids; a new genus for "Elosuchus" felixi de Lapparent de Broin (2002).	
Gryposuchus pachakamue	Sp. nov	Valid	Salas-Gismondi et al.	Miocene	Pebas Formation	Peru	A member of Gryposuchinae, a species of Gryposuchus.	
Kalthifrons	Gen. et sp. nov	Valid	Yates & Pledge	Pliocene	Tirari Formation	Australia	A member of Mekosuchinae. The type species is K. aurivellensis.	
Kentisuchus astrei	Sp. nov	Valid	Jouve	Eocene (late Lutetian)		France	A member of Tomistominae, a species of Kentisuchus.	
Lavocatchampsa	Gen. et sp. nov	Valid	Martin & De Lapparent De Broin	Cretaceous (Albian-Cenomanian)	Kem Kem Beds	Morocco	A notosuchian. The type species is L. sigogneaurusselae.	
Llanosuchus	Gen. et sp. nov	Valid	Fiorelli et al.	Late Cretaceous (Campanian?)	Los Llanos Formation	Argentina	A notosuchian crocodyliform. The type species is Llanosuchus tamaensis.	
Machimosaurus rex	Sp. nov	Valid	Fanti et al.	Early Cretaceous		Tunisia	A machimosaurid crocodylomorph, a species of Machimosaurus.	
Patagosuchus	Gen. et sp. nov	Valid	Lio et al.	Late Cretaceous (Turonian–Coniacian)	Portezuelo Formation	Argentina	A peirosaurid crocodylomorph. The type species is Patagosuchus anielensis.	
Protoalligator	Gen. et comb. nov	Valid	Wang, Sullivan & Liu	Middle Paleocene	Wanghudun Formation	China	A member of Orientalosuchina of uncertain phylogenetic placement; a new genus for "Eoalligator" huiningensis Young (1982).	
Sabinosuchus	Gen. et sp. nov	Valid	Shiller, Porras-Muzquiz & Lehman	Late Cretaceous (Maastrichtian)	Escondido Formation	Mexico	A member of Dyrosauridae or Pholidosauridae. The type species is S. coahuilensis.	
Sabresuchus	Gen. et comb. nov	Valid	Tennant, Mannion & Upchurch	Cretaceous (late Barremian–Maastrichtian)		Romania; Spain	A member of Paralligatoridae. The type species is "Theriosuchus" ibericus Brinkmann (1989); genus also includes "Theriosuchus" sympiestodon Martin, Rabi & Csiki (2010).	
Scutarx	Gen. et sp. nov	Valid	Parker	Late Triassic (middle Norian)	Chinle Formation; Cooper Canyon Formation	United States (Arizona, Texas)	An aetosaur. The type species is Scutarx deltatylus.	
Ultrastenos	Gen. et sp. nov	Valid	Stein, Hand & Archer	Late Oligocene	Riversleigh World Heritage Area	Australia	A member of Mekosuchinae. The type species is U. willisi. Yates & Stein (2024) subsequently interpreted U. willisi as a junior synonym of "Baru" huberi, but maintained Ultrastenos as a distinct mekosuchine genus, resulting in a new combination Ultrastenos huberi.	
Vivaron	Gen. et sp. nov	Valid	Lessner et al.	Late Triassic (Norian)	Chinle Formation	United States (New Mexico)	A rauisuchid. The type species is V. haydeni.	

== Basal dinosauromorphs ==
=== Research ===
- Marsicano et al. (2016) date the Chañares Formation, containing fossils of non-dinosaurian dinosauromorphs Lagerpeton, Lewisuchus, Marasuchus and Pseudolagosuchus, to early Carnian (236–234 Ma), 5–10 million years younger than previously thought. On this basis the authors postulate that the origin of dinosaurs was a relatively rapid event, as the transition from vertebrate communities containing only non-dinosaurian dinosauromorphs to communities containing the first dinosaurs occurred in less than a 5-million year interval.
- A study on the ontogeny of the femur and the histology of long bones of the silesaurid Asilisaurus kongwe is published by Griffin & Nesbitt (2016).
- Basal dinosauromorph fossils including fossils of both Dromomeron romeri and D. gregorii, as well as a dinosauriform fibula resembling the fibula of Marasuchus lilloensis but with much larger size, are described from the Late Triassic Dockum Group of Texas, USA by Sarıgül (2016).

=== New taxa ===
Name	Novelty	Status	Authors	Age	Unit	Location	Notes	Images
Dromomeron gigas	Sp. nov	Valid	Martínez et al.	Late Triassic (Norian)	Quebrada del Barro Formation	Argentina	A lagerpetid dinosauromorph, a species of Dromomeron.	
Ixalerpeton	Gen. et sp. nov	Valid	Cabreira et al.	Late Triassic (Carnian)	Santa Maria Formation	Brazil	A lagerpetid dinosauromorph. The type species is I. polesinensis.	

== Non-avian dinosaurs ==
=== Research ===
- An assessment of methods used to the determine the ontogenetic status of non-avian dinosaur specimens is published by Hone, Farke & Wedel (2016).
- A study of the evolutionary dynamics of speciation and extinction through time in Mesozoic dinosaurs is published by Sakamoto, Benton & Venditti (2016).
- A study on the dinosaur metabolism, re-evaluating earlier studies of Werner & Griebeler (2014) and Grady et al. (2014), is published by Myhrvold (2016).
- A study on the morphological similarities of the skulls of Plateosaurus engelhardti, Stegosaurus stenops and Erlikosaurus andrewsi, their feeding mechanics and behaviour is published by Lautenschlager et al. (2016).
- A study testing for a correlation between the presence of bony cranial ornaments and large body size in non-avian theropod dinosaurs is published by Gates, Organ & Zanno (2016).
- A description of theropod teeth from the Late Jurassic of Northern Germany and a study of their phylogenetic relationships is published by Gerke & Wings (2016).
- A study on the tooth attachment tissues in Coelophysis bauri is published by Fong et al. (2016).
- A study on the variation in morphological changes during ontogeny among members of the same species in early dinosaurs Coelophysis bauri and Megapnosaurus rhodesiensis as compared to the variation among living birds and crocodilians is published by Griffin & Nesbitt (2016).
- Senter & Juengst (2016) identify pathological features in eight pectoral girdle and forelimb bones of the holotype specimen of Dilophosaurus wetherilli.
- A study of osteology and phylogenetic relationships of Elaphrosaurus bambergi is published by Rauhut & Carrano (2016).
- A new specimen of Velocisaurus unicus is described by Brissón Egli, Agnolín & Novas (2016).
- Footprints attributed to large megalosaurid theropods are described from the Middle Jurassic (Bathonian) Serra de Aire Formation (Portugal) by Razzolini et al. (2016), who interpret the tracks as left by dinosaurs crossing the tidal flat during low tide periods.
- A study on the validity of the theropod genus Altispinax is published by Maisch (2016).
- Six isolated spinosaurid quadrates, most likely coming from the Kem Kem Beds, are described by Hendrickx, Mateus & Buffetaut (2016), who interpret the differences in their anatomy as confirming the presence of two spinosaurine taxa in the Cenomanian of North Africa, rather than only one (Spinosaurus aegyptiacus).
- The description of a new large abelisaurid femur (Dinosauria: Theropoda) from the Kem Kem Beds, by Alfio Alessandro Chiarenza & Andrea Cau (2016) demonstrates the presence of large bodied individuals of this clade sympatric with other giant theropod dinosaurs from this area. This study includes also an overview on the Cenomanian (Late Cretaceous) theropod assemblage from Morocco.
- Fossils of a large Early Cretaceous (Albian) megaraptorid theropod are described from the Griman Creek Formation (New South Wales, Australia) by Bell et al. (2016), who consider the theropod to be the largest predatory dinosaur yet identified from Australia.
- A study on the manual anatomy of Megaraptor and Australovenator, as well as its implications for the phylogenetic relationships of these taxa, is published by Novas, Aranciaga Rolando & Agnolín (2016).
- A study of the phylogenetic relationships of tyrannosauroid theropods is published by Brusatte and Carr (2016).
- Medullary bone homologous with one present in living birds is identified in a specimen of Tyrannosaurus rex by Schweitzer et al. (2016).
- Three fossil feathers from the Crato Member of the Early Cretaceous Santana Formation (Brazil) are described by Prado et al. (2016), who attribute them to coelurosaurian theropods of uncertain phylogenetic placement.
- Feathered tail of a theropod dinosaur, probably of a juvenile non-avian coelurosaur, preserved in Cretaceous (Albian-Cenomanian) Burmese amber is described by Xing et al. (2016)
- A study of the effectiveness of proposed pathways for the evolution of the flight stroke in non-avian coelurosaurian theropods and early birds using biomechanical mathematical models is published by Dececchi, Larsson & Habib (2016).
- A detailed description of the morphology of the mandible and teeth of Segnosaurus galbinensis is published by Zanno et al. (2016).
- The first known oviraptorosaur (Avimimus) bone bed is described from the Nemegt Formation (Mongolia) by Funston et al. (2016).
- New specimens of Elmisaurus rarus are described from the Late Cretaceous of Mongolia by Currie, Funston & Osmólska (2016).
- New specimens of Leptorhynchos elegans and Leptorhynchos sp. are described from the Late Cretaceous of Canada by Funston, Currie & Burns (2016).
- A study on the micro- and ultrastructure of the fossil claw sheath of a specimen of Citipati osmolskae, indicating the preservation of original keratinous claw material, is published by Moyer, Zheng & Schweitzer (2016).
- A study of the morphological disparity of teeth of maniraptoran theropods living during the last 18 million years of the Cretaceous is published by Larson, Brown and Evans (2016).
- A robust ilium of a basal sauropodomorph dinosaur is described from the Elliot Formation (South Africa) by McPhee & Choiniere (2016).
- A new complete femur assigned to Pampadromaeus barberenai is described by Müller et al. (2016).
- A study on the jaw adductor musculature and bite forces in Plateosaurus and Camarasaurus is published by Button, Barrett & Rayfield (2016).
- A study of the evolution of whole-body shape and body segment properties of sauropod dinosaurs is published by Bates et al. (2016).
- A study on the intervertebral joints in the necks and tails of sauropod dinosaurs, characterized by having the convex articular face directed away from the body and the concave articular face directed toward the body, is published by Fronimos, Wilson & Baumiller (2016), who argue that these joints evolved to prevent possible joint failure caused by rotation, providing stability with greater mobility and facilitating the evolution of elongated necks and tails in sauropods.
- A restudy of Sanpasaurus yaoi, originally classified as an ornithopod dinosaur, is published by McPhee et al. (2016), who consider this species to be an early sauropod instead.
- Description of several sauropod vertebrae collected from the Early Cretaceous Kirkwood Formation (South Africa) and a study on the diversity of the sauropods known from the Kirkwood Formation is published by McPhee et al. (2016).
- Gallina (2016) argues that Amargatitanis macni, initially considered to be a titanosaur, is actually a dicraeosaurid.
- A reassessment of the systematics, paleoenvironment, life history and geologic age of Sonorasaurus thompsoni is published by D'Emic, Foreman & Jud (2016).
- A study on divergence dates and ancestral ranges of Titanosauria is published by Gorscak & O'Connor (2016).
- Osteoma and hemangioma are documented for the first time in a vertebra of a titanosaur sauropod from the Late Cretaceous of Brazil by de Souza Barbosa et al. (2016).
- Sauropod fossils, including a caudal vertebra attributed to a large-bodied lithostrotian titanosaur, are reported from the Cretaceous Kem Kem Beds (Morocco) by Ibrahim et al. (2016).
- A study on the anatomy of the appendicular skeleton of Dreadnoughtus schrani is published by Ullmann & Lacovara (2016).
- A study of the skull anatomy and phylogenetic relationships of Tapuiasaurus macedoi is published by Wilson et al. (2016).
- A juvenile specimen of Rapetosaurus krausei is described by Curry Rogers et al. (2016).
- Well-vascularised endosteally formed bone tissue is reported in the saltasaurine titanosaurs by Chinsamy, Cerda & Powell (2016), who argue that additional evidence is required to determine whether vascularised endosteal bone tissues reported in extinct archosaurs are medullary bone or just a pathological bone.
- A study on the effect of jaw shape and jaw adductor musculature on the relative bite force in members of 52 ornithischian genera is published by Nabavizadeh (2016).
- A study on the anatomical diversity of the predentary in ornithischian dinosaurs is published by Nabavizadeh & Weishampel (2016).
- Heterodontosaurid metatarsi, phalanges and tail vertebrae are described from the Early Jurassic (late Toarcian) Cañadon Asfalto Formation (Argentina) by Becerra et al. (2016), who note the similarities in anatomy of the digits of this heterodontosaurid and the digits of arboreal birds and argue that the heterodontosaurid might have had grasping feet with long digits.
- New specimens of Lesothosaurus diagnosticus are described by Barrett et al. (2016).
- A description of the braincase anatomy of Pawpawsaurus campbelli based on CT scans is published by Paulina-Carabajal, Lee & Jacobs (2016).
- A new specimen of Haya griva is described from the Late Cretaceous of Mongolia by Norell & Barta (2016).
- A reassessment of the holotype locality of Leaellynasaura amicagraphica is published by Herne, Tait & Salisbury (2016), who argue that several fossils traditionally referred to L. amicagraphica cannot be confidently attributed to this species.
- A study on the evolution of the teeth morphologies of the ornithopod dinosaurs is published by Strickson et al. (2016), who argue that major increases of rates of dental character evolution among ornithopods did not correspond to times of plant diversification, including the radiation of the flowering plants.
- Fossils of a diminutive ornithopod dinosaur, probably a member of Rhabdodontidae, are described from the upper Barremian-lower Aptian Castrillo de la Reina Formation (Cameros Basin, Spain) by Dieudonné et al. (2016).
- A new specimen of Valdosaurus canaliculatus, the most complete yet found, is described by Barrett (2016).
- Tibia and tail vertebrae of iguanodontian dinosaurs are described from the Cleaver Bank (North Sea) by Mulder & Fraaije (2016).
- Isolated teeth of large-bodied iguanodontians are described from the Early Cretaceous (Albian) of Tunisia by Fanti et al. (2016).
- Parallel trackways of medium-sized and robust ornithopods similar to Draconyx or Cumnoria, providing evidence of gregarious behavior, are described from the Late Jurassic of Spain by Piñuela et al. (2016).
- A mandible of Telmatosaurus transsylvanicus exhibiting ameloblastoma is described from the Late Cretaceous Sînpetru Formation (Hațeg Basin, Romania) by Dumbravă et al. (2016).
- A revision of the original diagnosis of Willinakaqe salitralensis and of fossil material attributed to this species is published by Cruzado Caballero and Coria (2016), who argue that the fossils attributed to Willinakaqe salitralensis might represent more than a single taxon of hadrosaurid and that all characters of the original diagnosis are invalid.
- Large ornithopod (probably hadrosaurid) tracks, assigned to the ichnogenus Hadrosauropodus, are described from the Maastrichtian-Danian Yacoraite Formation of Argentina by Díaz-Martínez, de Valais & Cónsole-Gonella (2016).
- A hadrosaurid radius and ulna affected by a severe septic arthritis are described from the Late Cretaceous Navesink Formation (New Jersey, USA) by Anné, Hedrick & Schein (2016).
- A study on the development of the dental battery of the hadrosaurid dinosaurs through their ontogeny and on the evolution of the hadrosaurid dental battery is published by LeBlanc et al. (2016).
- Chondroid bone (a tissue intermediate between bone and cartilage) is reported in embryos and nestlings of Hypacrosaurus by Bailleul et al. (2016).
- Restudies of the fossil material attributed to Stegoceras novomexicanum are published by Williamson & Brusatte (2016) and Jasinski & Sullivan (2016).
- A study on the skull anatomy of Yinlong downsi is published by Han et al. (2016).
- A study of the bristle-like appendages on the tail of Psittacosaurus is published by Mayr et al. (2016).
- A study on the color patterns of a well-preserved specimen of Psittacosaurus sp. as indicated by the distribution of organic residues is published by Vinther et al. (2016).
- A study on the dental microwear in Leptoceratops gracilis is published by Varriale (2016).
- A study of the frill bones of Protoceratops andrewsi, indicating that its frill increased in length and width during the ontogeny of the animal and that the growth of the frill was greater than the overall growth of the animal, is published by Hone, Wood & Knell (2016), who interpret these findings as indicating that Protoceratops most likely used its frill for sexual and social dominance signaling.
- Partial skull of a ceratopsid related to Nasutoceratops titusi is described from the Late Cretaceous Oldman Formation (Alberta, Canada) by Ryan et al. (2016), who also name new ceratopsid tribes Centrosaurini and Nasutoceratopsini.
- A revision of the species assigned to the genus Chasmosaurus is published by Campbell et al. (2016).
- Forelimb studies show Oryctodromeus was extremely adapted for an underground lifestyle (2016).
- A group of paleontologists discovered the remains of the smallest specimen of Pachycephalosaurus to date. The specimen also casts doubt on the validity of Dracorex and Stygimoloch (2016).
- A study was done on the skulls of Majungasaurus and revealed changes throughout the life cycle of this dinosaur (2016).
- A study was conducted on the skeleton of Nasutoceratops, revealing that it and Avaceratops belonged to a completely new group of centrosaurines (2016).

=== New taxa ===
Name	Novelty	Status	Authors	Age	Unit	Location	Notes	Images
Agujaceratops mavericus	Sp. nov	Valid	Lehman, Wick & Barnes	Late Cretaceous	Aguja Formation	United States (Texas)	A chasmosaurine ceratopsian.	
Alcovasaurus	Gen. et comb. nov	Valid	Galton & Carpenter	Late Jurassic	Morrison Formation	United States (Wyoming)	A stegosaur; a new genus for "Stegosaurus" longispinus Gilmore (1914). This species was previously made the type species of the new genus Natronasaurus by Roman Ulansky (2014); however, Galton & Carpenter (2016) claim it did not meet the requirements of the International Code of Zoological Nomenclature.	
Aoniraptor	Gen. et sp. nov	Valid	Motta et al.	Late Cretaceous (middle Cenomanian-early Turonian)	Huincul Formation	Argentina	A theropod dinosaur of uncertain phylogenetic placement, a possible relative of Deltadromeus. The type species is A. libertatem.	
Apatoraptor	Gen. et sp. nov	Valid	Funston & Currie	Late Cretaceous	Horseshoe Canyon Formation	Canada (Alberta)	A caenagnathid theropod. The type species is Apatoraptor pennatus.	
Austroposeidon	Gen. et sp. nov	Valid	Bandeira et al.	Late Cretaceous (Campanian-Maastrichtian)	Presidente Prudente Formation	Brazil	A titanosaur sauropod. The type species is A. magnificus.	
Beipiaognathus	Gen. et sp. nov	Valid	Hu, Wang & Huang	Early Cretaceous	Yixian Formation	China	A compsognathid theropod. The type species is B. jii.	
Buriolestes	Gen. et sp. nov	Valid	Cabreira et al.	Late Triassic (Carnian)	Santa Maria Formation	Brazil	A basal member of Sauropodomorpha. The type species is B. schultzi.	
Datonglong	Gen. et sp. nov	Valid	Xu et al.	Late Cretaceous	Huiquanpu Formation	China	A non-hadrosaurid hadrosauroid ornithopod. The type species is Datonglong tianzhenensis.	
Dracoraptor	Gen. et sp. nov	Valid	Martill et al.	Early Jurassic (Hettangian)	Blue Lias Formation	United Kingdom	A basal member of Neotheropoda. The type species is Dracoraptor hanigani.	
Eotrachodon	Gen. et sp. nov	Valid	Prieto-Marquez, Erickson & Ebersole	Late Cretaceous (latest Santonian)	Mooreville Chalk	United States (Alabama)	A hadrosaurid ornithopod. The type species is Eotrachodon orientalis.	
Foraminacephale	Gen. et comb. nov	Valid	Schott & Evans	Late Cretaceous (Campanian)		Canada (Alberta)	A new genus for "Stegoceras" brevis Lambe (1918).	
Fukuivenator	Gen. et sp. nov	Valid	Azuma et al.	Early Cretaceous (Barremian or Aptian)	Kitadani Formation	Japan	A member of Maniraptora of uncertain phylogenetic placement, subsequently argued to be a therizinosaur. The type species is Fukuivenator paradoxus.	
Gastonia lorriemcwhinneyae	Sp. nov	Valid	Kinneer, Carpenter & Shaw	Early Cretaceous	Cedar Mountain Formation	United States (Utah)		
?Gryposaurus alsatei	Sp. nov	Valid	Lehman, Wick & Wagner	Late Cretaceous (Maastrichtian)	Javelina Formation	United States (Texas)	A hadrosaurid, possibly a species of Gryposaurus.	
Gualicho	Gen. et sp. nov	Valid	Apesteguía et al.	Late Cretaceous (Cenomanian to Turonian)	Huincul Formation	Argentina	A theropod dinosaur of uncertain phylogenetic placement, a possible relative of Deltadromeus. The taxon informally referred to as "Nototyrannus" before its formal description. The type species is G. shinyae.	
Lohuecotitan	Gen. et sp. nov	Valid	Díaz et al.	Late Cretaceous (late Campanian-early Maastrichtian)	Villalba de la Sierra Formation	Spain	A titanosaur sauropod. The type species is L. pandafilandi.	
Machairoceratops	Gen. et sp. nov	Valid	Lund et al.	Late Cretaceous (Campanian)	Wahweap Formation	United States (Utah)	A centrosaurine ceratopsian. The type species is Machairoceratops cronusi.	
Magnamanus	Gen. et sp. nov	Valid	Fuentes Vidarte et al.	Early Cretaceous (late Hauterivian or early Barremian)	Golmayo Formation	Spain	A basal member of Styracosterna. The type species is M. soriaensis.	
Meroktenos	Gen. et comb. nov	Valid	Peyre de Fabrègues & Allain	Late Triassic	Lower Elliot Formation	Lesotho	A non-sauropod sauropodomorph. The type species is "Melanorosaurus" thabanensis Gauffre (1993).	
Morrosaurus	Gen. et sp. nov	Valid	Rozadilla et al.	Late Cretaceous (Maastrichtian)	López de Bertodano Formation	Antarctica	An iguanodontian ornithopod. The type species is Morrosaurus antarcticus.	
Murusraptor	Gen. et sp. nov	Valid	Coria & Currie	Late Cretaceous (Coniacian)	Sierra Barrosa Formation	Argentina	A theropod belonging to the group Megaraptora. The type species is M. barrosaensis.	
Notocolossus	Gen. et sp. nov	Valid	González Riga et al.	Late Cretaceous (late Coniacian–early Santonian)	Plottier Formation	Argentina	A titanosaur sauropod. The type species is Notocolossus gonzalezparejasi.	
Rativates	Gen. et sp. nov	Valid	McFeeters et al.	Late Cretaceous (late Campanian)	Dinosaur Park Formation	Canada (Alberta)	An ornithomimid theropod. The type species is R. evadens.	
Sarmientosaurus	Gen. et sp. nov	Valid	Martínez et al.	Late Cretaceous (Cenomanian-Turonian)	Bajo Barreal Formation	Argentina	A titanosaur sauropod, a basal member of Lithostrotia. The type species is Sarmientosaurus musacchioi.	
Savannasaurus	Gen. et sp. nov		Poropat et al.	Late Cretaceous (Cenomanian-early Turonian)	Winton Formation	Australia	A titanosaur sauropod. The type species is S. elliottorum.	
Spiclypeus	Gen. et sp. nov	Valid	Mallon et al.	Late Cretaceous (late Campanian)	Judith River Formation	United States (Montana)	A chasmosaurine ceratopsian. The type species is Spiclypeus shipporum.	
Taurovenator	Gen. et sp. nov	Valid	Motta et al.	Late Cretaceous (middle Cenomanian-early Turonian)	Huincul Formation	Argentina	A carcharodontosaurid theropod. The type species is T. violantei.	
Timurlengia	Gen. et sp. nov	Valid	Brusatte et al.	Late Cretaceous (Turonian)	Bissekty Formation	Uzbekistan	A non-tyrannosaurid tyrannosauroid. The type species is Timurlengia euotica.	
Tongtianlong	Gen. et sp. nov		Lü et al.	Late Cretaceous (Maastrichtian)	Nanxiong Formation	China	An oviraptorid theropod. The type species is T. limosus.	
Tototlmimus	Gen. et sp. nov	Valid	Serrano-Brañas et al.	Late Cretaceous	Packard Shale Formation	Mexico	An ornithomimid theropod. The type species is Tototlmimus packardensis.	
Viavenator	Gen. et sp. nov	Valid	Filippi et al.	Late Cretaceous (Santonian)	Bajo de la Carpa Formation	Argentina	A brachyrostran abelisaurid theropod. The type species is Viavenator exxoni.	
Wiehenvenator	Gen. et sp. nov.	Valid	Rauhut, Hübner & Lanser	Middle Jurassic (Callovian)	Ornatenton Formation	Germany	A megalosaurid theropod. The type species is W. albati.	

== Birds ==
=== Research ===
- A study on the rates of morphological evolution in Early Cretaceous birds is published by Wang and Lloyd (2016).
- A study on the microbodies associated with feathers of a new specimen of Eoconfuciusornis from the Early Cretaceous Huajiying Formation (China) and on the matrix in which the microbodies were embedded is published by Pan et al. (2016), who interpret the microbodies as melanosomes.
- Remains of non-plumage soft tissues, including scales, toe pads, skin and muscle, are identified in two specimens of Confuciusornis by Falk et al. (2016).
- A skeleton of an enantiornithine bird preserving a gastric pellet that includes fish bones is described from the Early Cretaceous Jehol Biota of China by Wang, Zhou & Sullivan (2016).
- Two partial wings with vestiges of soft tissues, probably belonging to precocial hatchlings of enantiornithine birds, are described from the Late Cretaceous (Cenomanian) Burmese amber by Xing et al. (2016).
- A revised diagnosis of Cerebavis cenomanica, a study on the braincase anatomy of the species and a study on its phylogenetic relationships is published by Walsh, Milner & Bourdon (2016).
- A study on the shape, growth, attachment, implantation, replacement, and tissue microstructures of the teeth of Hesperornis and Ichthyornis is published by Dumont et al. (2016).
- A phylogenetic analysis of Hesperornithiformes is published by Bell & Chiappe (2016).
- A specimen of Hesperornis with a healed wound is described from the Late Cretaceous Pierre Shale (South Dakota, United States) by Martin, Rothschild & Burnham (2016), who interpret the wound as caused by an unsuccessful attack of a polycotylid plesiosaur.
- Pelvic elements of Gargantuavis philoinos, providing new information about the pelvic morphology of the species, are described from the Late Cretaceous (late Campanian/early Maastrichtian) of southern France by Buffetaut & Angst (2016).
- A specimen of Vegavis iaai with a fossilized syrinx is described from the Late Cretaceous of Antarctica by Clarke et al. (2016).
- A study on the feeding mechanics and behaviour of five moa species is published by Attard et al. (2016).
- Mariana B.J. Picasso & María Clelia Mosto, 2016: Hinasuri nehuensis Tambussi was a robust, extinct rheid bird from the early Pliocene of Buenos Aires province, Argentina. This paper revisits the femoral morphology of H. nehuensis and provides an updated osteological description together with new insights into its palaeobiology.
- Restudies of the Pleistocene species Rhea pampeana and Rhea anchorenensis are published by Picasso (2016) and Picasso and Mosto (2016), respectively, who consider these species to be junior synonyms of the extant greater rhea (Rhea americana).
- Demarchi et al. (2016) report the recovery of mineral-bound protein sequences from ostrich eggshells from the paleontological sites of Laetoli and Olduvai Gorge (Tanzania).
- Worthy et al. (2016) argue that Sylviornis neocaledoniae is a stem-galliform related to Megavitiornis altirostris and both are placed in the Sylviornithidae Mourer-Chauviré et Balouet, 2005.
- A revision of the systematics of the early Eocene North American members of Geranoididae is published by Mayr (2016), who argues that geranoidids might be stem group representatives of the Gruoidea (the clade including trumpeters, cranes and related birds).
- Zelenkov, Boev & Lazaridis (2016) reinterpret Otis hellenica from the Miocene of Greece, originally thought to be a bustard, as a member of Gruiformes belonging to the family Eogruidae and the subfamily Ergilornithinae; the authors classify it as a possible member of the genus Amphipelargus of uncertain specific assignment ("?Amphipelargus sp.").
- A restudy of the holotype specimen of Bathornis grallator and a study on the taxonomic composition and phylogenetic affinities of bathornithids is published by Mayr (2016).
- Zelenkov, Volkova and Gorobets (2016) describe buttonquail fossils from the late Miocene of Hungary, southern Ukraine and northern Kazakhstan, and transfer the species Calidris janossyi Kessler (2009) to the genus Ortyxelos.
- Gerald Mayr and Zbigniew M. Bochenski,(2016) describe a disarticulated postcranial skeleton of a Ralloidea from the Early Oligocene (Rupelian) Jamna Dolna Site 2 in Poland as Gen. et Sp. indet.
- Agnolin, Tomassini and Contreras (2016) describe a distal end of tarsometatarsus from the late Miocene levels of the Loma de Las Tapias Formation (San Juan Province, Argentina), identified as the oldest seedsnipe fossil discovered so far.
- Body mass estimates for 25 extinct pan-alcids and a study of body mass evolution in Pan-Alcidae are published by Smith (2016).
- The earliest known cranial endocast of a stem-penguin (a member of the genus Waimanu) is described from the Paleocene Waipara Greensand (New Zealand) by Proffitt, Clarke & Scofield (2016).
- Thomas & Ksepka (2016) classify a Whaingaroan penguin from the Glen Massey Formation (North Island, New Zealand), first described in 1973, as a member of the genus Kairuku of uncertain specific assignment, extending the geographic range of the genus.
- Park et al., 2016 The description of recently collected penguin fossils from the re-dated upper Miocene Port Campbell Limestone of Portland (Victoria), in addition to reanalysis of previously described material, has allowed the Cenozoic history of penguins in Australia to be placed into a global context for the first time. Australian pre-Quaternary fossil penguins represent stem taxa phylogenetically disparate from each other and Eudyptula minor, implying multiple dispersals and extinctions.
- Carolina Acosta Hospitaleche, Leandro M. Pérez, Sergio Marenssi, Marcelo Reguero (2016). The purpose of this paper is to provide a taphonomic analysis of the holotype of Crossvallia unienwillia, in order to improve the knowledge of the vertebrate record of the Cross Valley Formation, a unit exposed in the central area of Marambio (Seymour) Island, Antarctic Peninsula.
- A new skeleton of the Eocene penguin Palaeeudyptes klekowskii is described from the Submeseta Formation (Seymour Island, Antarctica) by Acosta Hospitaleche (2016).
- Carolina Acosta Hospitaleche & Eduardo Olivero, 2016: Eocene penguins are known mostly from Antarctic specimens. A previously documented partial skeleton consisting of a pelvis, femur, tibiotarsus and fibula, from the middle Eocene Leticia Formation, Tierra del Fuego Province, Argentina, has been prepared and re-described. Re-analysis favours assignment to Palaeeudyptes gunnari, a species widely recorded in the Eocene of Antarctica.
- Fossils of a stork and a heron belonging or related to the tribe Nycticoracini are described from the Pliocene of Myanmar by Stidham et al. (2016).
- A restudy of the fossils attributed to the species Liornis floweri and Callornis giganteus from the Miocene Santa Cruz Formation (Patagonia, Argentina) is published by Buffetaut (2016), who considers L. floweri to be a junior synonym of Brontornis burmeisteri and considers C. giganteus to be a chimera based on a phorusrhacid tarsometatarsus and a brontornithid tibiotarsus.
- A study of eggshell fragments from the Pleistocene of Australia putatively referred to Genyornis newtoni is published by Grellet-Tinner, Spooner & Worthy (2016), who argue that these fossils are more likely to be remains of eggs laid by megapodes. Based on the similarities in the structure of eggshells of megapodes and dromornithids, the authors also hypothesize that dromornithids might be a sister group to galliforms rather than to or within anseriforms.
- A study of burnt putative Genyornis eggshell fragments from the Pleistocene of Australia is published by Miller et al. (2016), who interpret them as confirming that eggs of Genyornis newtoni were harvested by humans.
- A study on the possible presence, form, and extent of sexual dimorphism in Dromornis stirtoni is published by Handley et al. (2016).
- Gastornithid and presbyornithid fossils are described from the early Eocene of Ellesmere Island (Canada) by Stidham & Eberle (2016).
- The genus Wilaru, initially considered to be of a stone-curlew, is reinterpreted as a member of Presbyornithidae by De Pietri et al. (2016); the authors also reassess the Cretaceous species Teviornis gobiensis and confirm it as a member of Presbyornithidae.
- A revision of anseriform birds known from the late Miocene localities in central Hungary is published by Zelenkov (2016), who transfers the species Anas denesi Kessler (2013) to the genus Aythya and classifies the species Anas albae Janossy (1979) as a member of tribe Mergini of uncertain generic assignment.
- A revision of galliform birds known from the late Miocene localities in central Hungary is published by Zelenkov (2016), who transfers the subspecies Pavo aesculapi phasianoides Janossy (1991) to the genus Syrmaticus and raises it to the rank of a separate species Syrmaticus phasianoides.
- New fossil remains of the Eocene cuckoo Chambicuculus pusillus are described from Tunisia by Mourer-Chauviré et al. (2016).
- Virtual cranial endocast of the dodo is described by Gold, Bourdon & Norell (2016).
- An ungual phalanx of a large member of Accipitridae belonging to an unknown genus and species is described from the Miocene of Panama by Steadman & MacFadden (2016).
- Partial tarsometatarsus of a small parrot is described from the Early Miocene Khalagay Formation (Baikal region, Russia) by Zelenkov (2016).
- A study on the phylogenetic relationships of extant and extinct New Zealand wrens, as indicated by data from novel mitochondrial genome sequences, is published by Mitchell et al. (2016).
- Fossil avian feet from the Early Eocene of Messel, Germany are described by Gerald Mayr
- A new tracksite with bird footprints (attributed to the ichnospecies Uvaichnites riojana), preserved in the early Miocene Lerín Formation (Bardenas Reales de Navarra Natural Park, Navarre, Spain), is described by Díaz-Martínez et al. (2016).
- A new ichnospecies, Koreananornis lii, from the Lower Cretaceous avian track locality in the Guanshan area, Yongjing County, Gansu Province, northwest China, is described by Xing, Buckley, Lockley, Zhang, Marty, Wang, Li, McCrea et Peng, 2016. (2016).
- An avian egg from the Lower Cretaceous (Albian) Liangtoutang Formation is described by Lawver et al. (2016) and named Pachycorioolithus jinyunensis oogen. et oosp. nov. within Pachycorioolithidae oofam. nov.
- Three pellets with bird remains are described from the Eocene Messel pit (Germany) by Mayr & Schaal (2016), who interpret two of the pellets as probably produced by snakes or other squamates, and one as probable owl pellet (which, if confirmed, would make it the oldest owl pellet identified so far), possibly produced by the owl Palaeoglaux artophoron.

=== New taxa ===
Name	Novelty	Status	Authors	Age	Unit	Location	Notes	Images
Antarctoboenus	Gen. et sp. nov.	Valid	Cenizo, Noriega & Reguero	Early Eocene	La Meseta Formation	Antarctica (Seymour Island)	A stem-falconid. The type species is A. carlinii.	
Bellulornis	Gen. et sp. nov.	Valid	Wang, Zhou & Zhou	Early Cretaceous	Jiufotang Formation	China	A basal member of Ornithuromorpha. The type species is B. rectusunguis. The original generic name was Bellulia, which turned out to be preoccupied by Bellulia Fibiger (2008).	
Calciavis	Gen. et sp. nov.	Valid	Nesbitt & Clarke	Early Eocene	Green River Formation	United States (Wyoming)	A member of Lithornithidae. The type species is C. grandei.	
Centropus bairdi	Sp. nov.	Valid	Shute, Prideaux & Worthy	Pleistocene		Australia	A member of the Cuculidae.	
Centropus maximus	Sp. nov.	Valid	Shute, Prideaux & Worthy	Pleistocene		Australia	A member of the Cuculidae.	
Changzuiornis	Gen. et sp. nov.	Valid	Huang et al.	Early Cretaceous (Aptian)	Jiufotang Formation	China	An early member of Euornithes. The type species is C. ahgmi.	
Chiappeavis	Gen. et sp. nov.	Valid	O'Connor et al.	Early Cretaceous	Jiufotang Formation	China	A member of Enantiornithes, probably belonging to the family Pengornithidae. The type species is C. magnapremaxillo.	
Chionoides	Gen. et sp. nov.	Valid	De Pietri et al.	Late Oligocene		Australia	A member of Chionoidea of uncertain phylogenetic placement, showing the mosaic of characters shared with both sheathbills and the Magellanic plover. The type species is C. australiensis.	
Chongmingia	Gen. et sp. nov.	Valid	Wang et al.	Early Cretaceous (Aptian)	Jiufotang Formation	China	A member of Avialae of uncertain phylogenetic placement. The type species is C. zhengi.	
Cypseloramphus	Gen. et sp. nov.	Valid	Mayr	Early Eocene	Messel pit	Germany	Possibly a basal member of Apodiformes. The type species is C. dimidius.	
Daphoenositta trevorworthyi	Sp. nov.	Valid	Nguyen	Miocene	Riversleigh World Heritage Area	Australia	A sittella	
Dingavis	Gen. et sp. nov.	Valid	O'Connor, Wang & Hu	Early Cretaceous	Yixian Formation	China	A basal member of Ornithuromorpha. The type species is D. longimaxilla.	
Dromornis murrayi	Sp. nov.	Valid	Worthy et al.	Late Oligocene–Early Miocene	Riversleigh	Australia	A member of Dromornithidae	
Eostrix gulottai	Sp. nov.	Valid	Mayr	Early Eocene	Nanjemoy Formation	United States (Virginia)	An early owl. Originally described as a species of Eostrix, but subsequently transferred to the genus Ypresiglaux.	
Eurobambusicola	Gen. et sp. nov.	Valid	Zelenkov	Late Miocene		Hungary	A member of the family Phasianidae. The type species is E. turolicus.	
Galligeranoides	Gen. et sp. nov.	Valid	Bourdon, Mourer-Chauviré, & Laurent	middle Ypresian		France	A bird of uncertain phylogenetic placement, might be a member of the family Geranoididae or a member of Palaeognathae related to Palaeotis. The type species is G. boriensis.	
Gallinago kakuki	Sp. nov.	Valid	Steadman & Takano	Late Quaternary		The Bahamas; Cayman Islands; Cuba	A member of Scolopacidae, a species of Gallinago.	
Hesperornis lumgairi	Sp. nov.	Valid	Aotsuka & Sato	Campanian	Pierre Shale	Canada	A species of Hesperornis.	
Klallamornis	Gen. et sp. nov.	Valid	Mayr & Goedert	Latest Eocene or Early Oligocene		United States (Washington)	A Plotopteridae. Type species is K. abyssa. Mayr & Goedert (2025) subsequently considered K. abyssa to be a junior synonym of "Tonsala" buchanani Dyke, Wang & Habib (2011), but maintained Klallamornis as a distinct genus, resulting in a new combination Klallamornis buchanani.	
?Klallamornis clarki	Sp. nov.	Valid	Mayr & Goedert	Latest Eocene or Early Oligocene		United States (Washington)	A member of Plotopteridae. possibly a species of Klallamornis.	
Lapillavis	Gen. et sp. nov.	Valid	Mayr	Early Eocene	Messel pit	Germany	A bird of uncertain phylogenetic placement, showing similarities to Foshanornis songi. The type species is L. incubarens.	
Linyiornis	Gen. et sp. nov.	Valid	Wang et al.	Early Cretaceous	Jiufotang Formation	China	A member of Enantiornithes. The type species is L. amoena.	
Mioneophron	Gen. et sp. nov.	Valid	Li et al.	Late Miocene	Liushu Formation	China	A member of Gypaetinae Vieillot (1816). The type species is M. longirostris.	
Mioryaba	Gen. et sp. nov.	Valid	Zelenkov	Late Miocene		Hungary	A member of the family Phasianidae. The type species is M. magyarica.	
Monoenantiornis	Gen. et sp. nov.	Valid	Hu & O'Connor	Early Cretaceous	Yixian Formation	China	A member of Enantiornithes. The type species is M. sihedangia.	
Neilus	Gen. et sp. nov.	Valid	De Pietri et al.	Early Miocene		New Zealand	A member of Chionoidea of uncertain phylogenetic placement, showing the mosaic of characters shared with both sheathbills and the Magellanic plover. The type species is N. sansomae.	
Notoleptos	Gen. et sp. nov	Valid	Acosta Hospitaleche & Gelfo	Late Eocene		Antarctica (Seymour Island)	A probable relative of albatrosses. The type species is N. giglii.	
Olympidytes	Gen. et sp. nov.	Valid	Mayr & Goedert	Latest Eocene or Early Oligocene		United States (Washington)	A member of Plotopteridae. The type species is O. thieli.	
Phalcoboenus napieri	Sp. nov.	Valid	Adams & Woods	Holocene		Falkland Islands	A member of Phalcoboenus.	
Primozygodactylus longibrachium	Sp. nov.	Valid	Mayr	Early Eocene	Messel pit	Germany	A member of Zygodactylidae.	
Primozygodactylus quintus	Sp. nov.	Valid	Mayr	Early Eocene	Messel pit	Germany	A member of Zygodactylidae.	
Protomelanitta bakeri	Sp. nov.	Valid	Stidham & Zelenkov	Miocene	Esmeralda Formation	United States (Nevada)	A primitive diving duck.	
Pseudoseisuropsis wintu	Sp. nov.	Valid	Stefanini, Gómez & Tambussi	Early Pleistocene	Miramar Formation	Argentina	An ovenbird	
Rallus nanus	Nom. nov.	Valid	Alcover et al.	Holocene		Azores	A member of Rallidae, a species of Rallus; a replacement name for Rallus minutus Alcover et al. (2015) (preoccupied).	
Septencoracias	Gen. et sp. nov.	Valid	Bourdon, Kristoffersen & Bonde	Eocene (Ypresian)	Fur Formation	Denmark	A member of Coracii belonging to the family Primobucconidae. The type species is S. morsensis.	
Tingmiatornis	Gen. et sp. nov.		Bono et al.	Late Cretaceous (Turonian)		Canada (Nunavut)	A member of Ornithurae of uncertain phylogenetic placement. The type species is T. arctica.	
Uria onoi	Sp. nov.	Valid	Watanabe et al.	Late Pleistocene		Japan	A member of Alcidae	
Wilaru prideauxi	Sp. nov.	Valid	De Pietri et al.	Early Miocene	Etadunna Formation; Wipajiri Formation	Australia	A species of Wilaru. Announced in 2016; the correction including the required ZooBank accession number was published in 2020.	

== Pterosaurs ==
=== Research ===
- A new wukongopterid specimen is described from the Late Jurassic Daohugou Bed or Tiaojishan Formation (China) by Cheng et al. (2016).
- Description of a new specimen of Gladocephaloideus jingangshanensis and a study of the phylogenetic relationships of this species is published by Lü, Kundrát & Shen (2016).
- New information on the braincase anatomy of Pterodaustro guinazui is published by Codorniú, Paulina-Carabajal & Gianechini (2016).
- A small azhdarchoid, possibly an azhdarchid, is described from the Late Cretaceous (Campanian) Northumberland Formation (British Columbia, Canada) by Martin-Silverstone et al. (2016).
- Kellner et al. (2016) redescribe the first pterosaur remains from Japan, referring it to a pteranodontid-like pterosaur and indicating that it is the largest pterosaur recorded from Asia so far.

=== New taxa ===
Name	Novelty	Status	Authors	Age	Unit	Location	Notes	Images
Allkaruen	Gen. et sp. nov	Valid	Codorniú et al.	Early-Middle Jurassic	Cañadón Asfalto Formation	Argentina	A non-pterodactyloid member of Breviquartossa. The type species is A. koi.	
Aymberedactylus	Gen. et sp. nov	Valid	Pêgas, Leal & Kellner	Early Cretaceous (Aptian-Albian)	Crato Formation	Brazil	A member of Tapejarinae. The type species is A. cearensis.	
Forfexopterus	Gen. et sp. nov	Valid	Jiang et al.	Early Cretaceous	Jiufotang Formation	China	A member of Archaeopterodactyloidea. The type species is F. jeholensis.	
Huaxiapterus atavismus	Sp. nov	Valid	Lü et al.	Early Cretaceous	Jiufotang Formation	China	A member of Sinopterinae. Later considered as a synonym of Sinopterus dongi.	
Pangupterus	Gen. et sp. nov	Valid	Lü et al.	Early Cretaceous	Jiufotang Formation	China	A toothed member of Pterodactyloidea. The type species is P. liui.	
Sinopterus lingyuanensis	Sp. nov	Valid	Lü et al.	Early Cretaceous	Jiufotang Formation	China	A member of Sinopterinae. Later considered as a synonym of Sinopterus dongi.	
