= Eurofluvioviridavis =

Eurofluvioviridavis Temporal range: Middle Eocene

Scientific classification
- Kingdom: Animalia
- Phylum: Chordata
- Class: Aves
- Family: †Vastanavidae
- Genus: †Eurofluvioviridavis; Mayr, 2005

Type species
- †Eurofluvioviridavis robustipes (Mayr, 2005)

Synonyms
- Avolatavis?

Extinct genus of birds

Eurofluvioviridavis is a genus of extinct birds from the Middle Eocene Messel Pit, Germany. It contains a single species, Eurofluvioviridavis robustipes. It is related to Avolatavis and Vastanavis, other members of the family Vastanavidae.

== Discovery and naming ==
The holotype of Eurofluvioviridavis, SMNK.PAL.3835, was found in the lower middle Eocene Messel Pit, near Darmstadt, Germany, in the MP 11 Mammal Paleogene zone. The fossil consists of a well-preserved skeleton. An additional counter-slab of the holotype exists, but was not studied in the genus' description.

Eurofluvioviridavis was scientifically described in Mayr (2005) as a bird similar to Fluvioviridavis from the Green River Formation in Wyoming. The generic name Eurofluvioviridavis refers to a similarity to the aforementioned taxon as well as the fossil's European provenance. The specific ephitet, robustipes, is from Latin robustus, meaning robust, and pes, meaning foot, in reference to strongly built feet.

== Description ==
Eurofluvioviridavis had a wide, flattened beak, resembling that of tyrant flycatchers. It is as long as the rest of the head, and is constant in width in the rear half, tapering to a point in the front half. The nostrils are large. The palate is not heavily ossified, unlike in some extant birds with wide, flat beaks, and there are no basipterygoid processes. There are eight caudal vertebrae and the pygostyle is narrow. The coracoid possesses a foramen for the supracoracoid nerve. The lateral process of the coracoid is a small, hooklike structure. The humerus is proportionally falcon-like, with a large deltapectoral crest and a curved shaft. The ulna is longer than the humerus, with eight to thirteen quill knobs indicating a relatively low number of secondary feathers. The carpometacarpus is relatively long, and the phalanx of the alula has a poorly developed claw. The femur is short and stout, while the fibula is moderate in proportions.

The tarsometatarsus and feet of Eurofluvioviridavis resemble those of Avolatavis and Vastanavis. The tarsometatarsus is stout. The feet show a semi-zygodactyl arrangement, and the ungual phalanges are raptor-like, possibly indicating that Eurofluvioviridavis could grasp with the foot.

== Classification ==
Cladistic analyses support a relationship between the genera Vastanavis, Avolatavis, and Eurofluvioviridavis in the family Vastanavidae. Their position relative to modern birds is not clear; it is possible that the vastanavids are stem-group relatives of the parrots, or that they are part of the stem group of the Psittacopasseres. These hypotheses are supported by morphological analysis and morphological analysis with molecular constraints, respectively. Eurofluvioviridavis, like other vastanavids and other psittacopasserean outgroups like the Halcyornithidae and the Messelasturidae, possess short tarsometatarsi. This is in the contrast to the long tarsometatarsi plesiomorphic to the Australaves, the clade including falcons, parrots, and songbirds, which appears to indicate that a short, stocky tarsometatarsus was plesiomorphic to Pan-Psittacopasseres, the total group including parrots, songbirds, and their stem-lineage representatives.

Avolatavis has not been differentiated from Eurofluvioviridavis, meaning it is possible that the former taxon is a junior synonym. However, a non-overlap of important fossil material means that it is not currently possible to assess the status of these genera.
