= Eofringillirostrum =

Eofringillirostrum Temporal range: Early Eocene

Scientific classification
- Kingdom: Animalia
- Phylum: Chordata
- Class: Aves
- Clade: Passerimorphae
- Family: †Psittacopedidae
- Genus: †Eofringillirostrum; Ksepka, Mayr, & Grande, 2019

Type species
- †Eofringillirostrum boudreauxi Ksepka, Mayr, & Grande, 2019

Extinct genus of birds

Eofringillirostrum is an extinct species of bird known from the Early Eocene Green River Formation of the Western United States and from the Messel Pit in Germany. The genus contains two species, Eofringillirostrum boudreauxi and Eofringillirostrum parvulum. They are the earliest known fossil birds to have a finch-like beak.

== Discovery and naming ==
The holotype of Eofringillirostrum boudreauxi, FMNH PA 793, consists of a complete skeleton preserving impressions of the feathers. It was found in the "sandwich beds" of the Fossil Butte Member of the Green River Formation, near Kemmerer, Wyoming, United States. The holotype of Eofringillirostrum parvulum, IRSNB Av 128a+b, consists of a partial skeleton preserved in slab and counter-slab. The fossil comes from the Messel Formation in Germany. The postcranial remains are poorly preserved in IRSNB Av 128. In 2019, Ksepka, Mayr, and Grande described both species as members of the Psittacopedidae, noting that they were the first birds with finch-like beaks in the fossil record. The generic name Eofringillirostrum comes from the Greek eos, meaning "dawn", Latin fringilla, meaning "finch", and rostrum, meaning "beak", in reference to that anatomical feature. The specific epithet boudreauxi refers to Terry Boudreaux, who donated the holotype of the American species to the Field Museum. The specific epithet parvulum is Latin for "small", referring to the size of the bird.

== Description ==
Eofringillirostrum were small birds, with Eofringillirostrum boudreauxi about as large as a red-breasted nuthatch and Eofringillirostrum parvulum even smaller. They possessed conical, tapering bills with fine tips, much like modern finches, such as the modern American goldfinch. The lower half of the beak curves slightly downward.

In the postcranial skeleton, the pygostyle is very small. The coracoid has no foramen (opening) for the supracoracoid nerve. The wings are similar to those of other stem group passerine birds, with a short humerus and an ulna that exceeds it in length. The tarsometatarsus is relatively short and is about half the length of the tibiotarsus. On the feet, the trochlea of the fourth metatarsal has an accessory trochlea, separated by the other trochleae by a groove, which indicates that Eofringillirostrum had a zygodactyl foot arrangement, like other Eocene stem passerines. Well-preserved feather impressions allow for measurement of the wings and tail. The wings were relatively narrow, and the tail accounted for about a third of total body length. The feet were well-adapted for manipulating food items.

== Classification ==
Eofringillirostrum is similar to the Psittacopedidae, a family of zygodactyl stem-passerines from the early Eocene. Simplified cladogram after Ksepka et al. (2019):

- - †Eocuculus
  - - †Psittacopedidae
      - †Psittacopes
      - - - †Morsoravis sp.
          - †Morsoravis sedilis
        - - †Pumiliornis tesselatus
          - - †Eofringillirostrum parvulum
            - †Eofringillirostrum boudreauxi
    - - †Zygodactylidae
      - Passeriformes

A subsequent analysis, published in Mayr (2020), did not support the positioning of Eofringillirostrum as a psittacopedid and rather placed it as the sister taxon to a clade of Psittacopedidae, Halcyornithidae, and Messelasturidae. Mayr & Kitchener (2022) noted that although there are differences between Eofringillirostrum and unambiguous psittacopedids in foot anatomy, this could be a result of specialised ecology, rather than from a distant relationship.

== Palaeobiology ==
Eofringillirostrum is the earliest known member of Aves to have specialisations for feeding on small, hard-shelled seeds. Although earlier birds, including taxa from the Cretaceous like Sapeornis and Jeholornis, had a diet including seeds, they do not appear to have possessed adaptations to eat seeds primarily. Indeed, the beak shape shown in Eofringillirostrum is found in modern birds only in groups that feed on seeds. The scarcity of finch-beaked birds in the Eocene apart from Eofringillirostrum suggests that this ecological niche was occupied by relatively few birds in that time period, perhaps because of the small extent of temperate forests and grasslands at the time.

The last common ancestor of the songbirds is not thought to have consumed seeds, indicating that this ecological niche was filled by different adaptive radiations in the Cenozoic. The diversity of lifestyles among Psittacopedidae, which includes the nectivore Pumiliornis and the thrush-like Morsoravis, are an example of such a radiation. Despite their diversity, the Psittacopedidae, like other zygodactyl stem-passerines, left no living representatives after the Eocene. Ksepka et al. hypothesised that these birds were specialised for cavity nesting, depending on holes in trees for nests. The anisodactyl passerines construct much more varied nests and do not depend on such cavities, and, as such, could have outcompeted other birds with similar feeding specialisations.
