= Parapsittacopes =

Parapsittacopes Temporal range: Early Eocene

Scientific classification
- Kingdom: Animalia
- Phylum: Chordata
- Class: Aves
- Clade: Passerimorphae
- Family: †Psittacopedidae
- Genus: †Parapsittacopes; Mayr, 2020

Type species
- †Parapsittacopes bergdahli Mayr, 2020

Extinct genus of birds

Parapsittacopes is an extinct genus of psittacopedid bird from the Early Eocene London Clay, United Kingdom. The genus contains one species, Parapsittacopes bergdahli.

== Discovery and naming ==
The holotype of Parasittacopes was collected from the London Clay near Walton-on-the-Naze by Paul Bergdahl of Kirby-le-Soken, a private collector. The specimen later became available to science with the help of Bergdahl's son, and is designated SMF Av 653. The specimen consists of a partial skeleton, including the skull, some of the jaw bones, several vertebrae, parts of the scapula, coracoid, and furcula, parts of many wing bones, and significant portions of the legs and feet.

In 2020, Parapsittacopes bergdahli was described as a new genus and species of psittacopedid by Gerald Mayr. The generic name is from Greek para, meaning "next to", and Psittacopes, the type genus of the Psittacopedidae to which Parapsittacopes is referred. The specific ephitet bergdahli is after Paul Bergdahl, the collector who initially discovered and excavated the holotype.

In 2022, additional material of the specimen NMS.Z.2021.40.43 was referred to Parapsittacopes. This specimen preserves bones of the wings, including parts of the ulnae, a radius, portions of the humerus, a left coracoid, part of a scapula, and several bones of the manus.

== Description ==
Parapsittacopes was a moderately small bird, about the size of the Speckled mousebird (Colius striatus). The upper beak is less than half the length of the skull as a whole, and is short and wide. The openings of the nostrils are very large. The beak is comparable to that of the Bohemian waxwing (Bombycilla garrulus). The coracoid bears a large procoracoid process, protruding from the side of the bone, and does not have a foramen for the supracoracoid nerve but rather a groove. The keel has a sharply pointed tip which protrudes forward. The humerus is short and wide, resembling that of mousebirds. The ulna is longer than the radius. In the pelvis, the ilium is not co-ossified with the synsacrum, a condition rare in modern arboreal birds. The femur is relatively long. There is a depression of the trochlea of the third toe and a splayed trochlea of the fourth toe, indicating that Parapsittacopes had a zygodactyl foot arrangement.

== Classification ==
Parapsittacopes was a member of the Psittacopedidae, a family of small birds that are likely a stem lineage related to the Passeriformes, the songbirds. Cladogram after analyses based solely on morphological data, Mayr (2020):

- - Halcyornithidae
  - - - Parapsittacopes
      - Pumiliornis
    - - Morsoravis
      - Psittacopes

However, this morphological analysis does not agree with studies based on DNA. When constrained to those molecular results, Parapsittacopes, along with the rest of the Psittacopedidae, were found to be most closely related to a clade of the Passeriformes and the Zygodactylidae, another extinct family of small arboreal birds of the Eocene.

== Palaeobiology ==
Parapsittacopes had a unique beak shape among the Psittacopedidae, which may be compared to extant birds: large nostrils and the curve of the beak resemble that of swifts and treeswifts, while the outline of the bill is similar to that of waxwings. This beak shape indicates that Parapsittacopes might have eaten fruit and caught insects by flying out from a perch. The resemblance in beak shape to swifts and treeswifts suggest that Parapsittacopes primarily ate insects. Unlike in modern songbirds and in the Zygodactylidae, Psittacopes has short legs, which might indicate that it walked on trees on the ground less than songbirds, rather choosing to remain perched on branches.

The beak shape of Psittacopes also provides insight into the disappearance of birds like it and Psittacopes. These birds had specialised diets and feeding styles, as shown by the variety of beak types they had. This could have made them more vulnerable to competition, facilitating the replacement of this family, one of the first kinds of neornithean to be small and arboreal.
