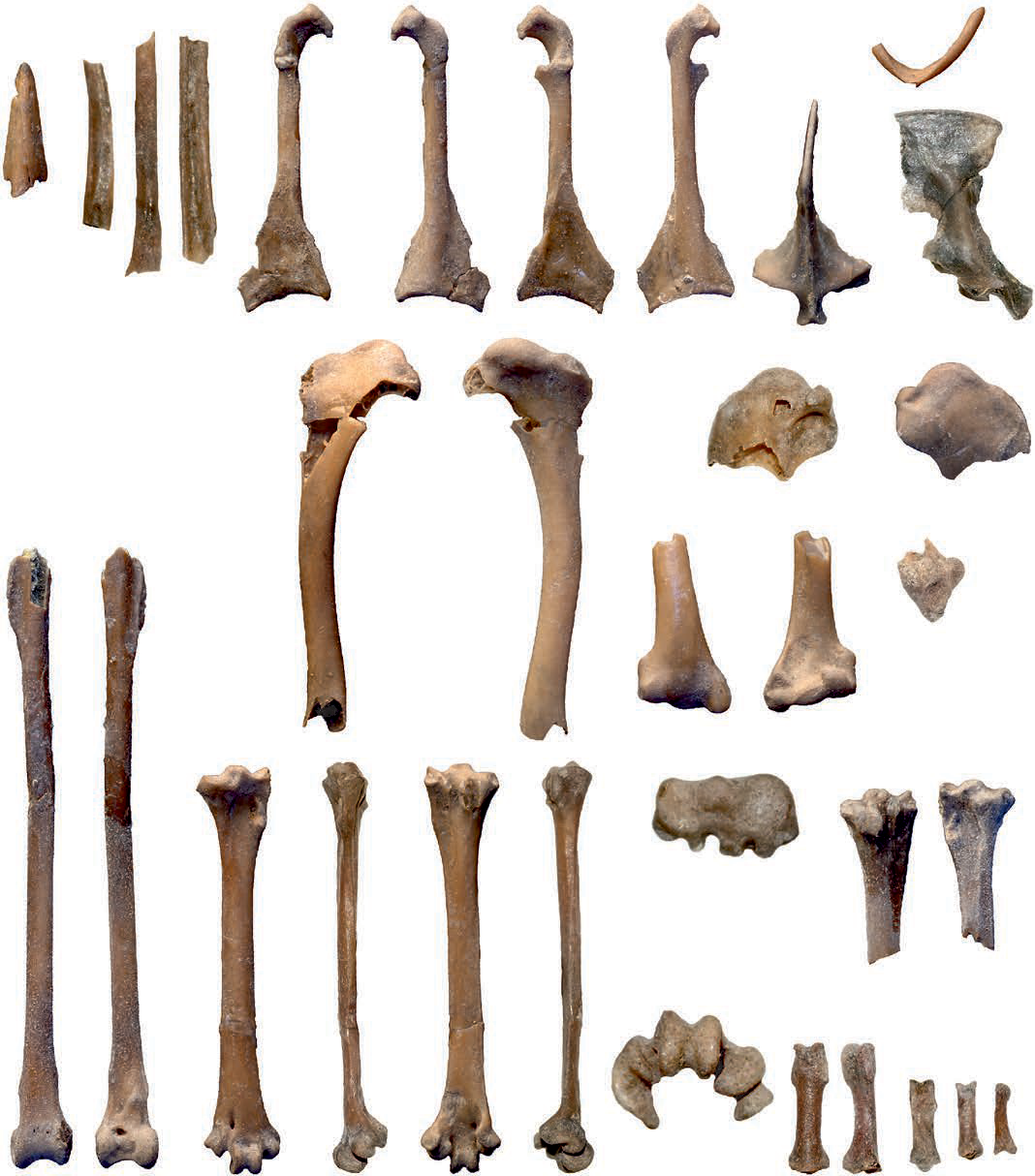
- Bones from the morosavid Soroavis solitarius

Scientific classification
- Kingdom: Animalia
- Phylum: Chordata
- Class: Aves
- Clade: Australaves
- Family: †Morsoravidae; Mayr, 2023

Genera
- †Morsoravis Bertelli et al., 2010; †Pumiliornis Mayr, 1999; †Sororavis Mayr, 2023; †Consoravis Ksepka et al., 2025

= Morsoravidae =

Morsoravidae Temporal range: Early Eocene

Extinct family of birds

Morsoravidae is a family of extinct birds known from the Early Eocene of Europe and North America, related to the Psittacopasseres, the clade containing parrots and songbirds. They have specialised feeding ecologies, and one morsoravid, Pumiliornis tesselatus, fed on nectar. The family contains the genera Morsoravis, Pumiliornis, Sororavis and Consoravis.

== Description ==
Common to the Morsoravidae is a distinctive morphology of the tarsometatarsus. The trochlea of the second and fourth metatarsals are distinct, and the fourth metatarsal trochlea is slanted in a way that strongly suggests that morsoravids were at least facultatively zygodactyl. The second metatarsal trochlea is characterised by large size (compared to Psittacopedidae and Zygodactylidae) and a cylindrical shape that allows little rotational movement of the toe. These adaptations are thought to improve these birds' climbing ability.

One morsoravid, a 47-million year old specimen of Pumiliornis tesselatus, has been found with pollen grains in its gut, indicating at least some level of nectarivory. Another morsoravid, Sororavis solitarius, is similar to mousebirds in details of the legs, suggesting that it could have been able to hang off of branches to reach food items.

== Distribution ==
Although most of the named species of Morsoravidae are known from European sites, Consoravis was discovered in the Green River Formation in the United States. Other morsoravids are known from the Fur Formation of Denmark, the Messel Pit in Germany, and the London Clay of England.
