= Vastanavidae =

Vastanavidae Temporal range: Eocene

Scientific classification
- Kingdom: Animalia
- Phylum: Chordata
- Class: Aves
- Clade: Australaves
- Family: †Vastanavidae; Mayr, 2010

Genera
- †Avolatavis Ksepka & Clarke, 2012; †Calcardea? Gingerich, 1987; †Eurofluvioviridavis Mayr, 2005; †Vastanavis Mayr et al., 2007

Extinct family of birds

Vastanavidae is an extinct family of birds related to parrots and passerine birds. They are known from fossils from Eocene sites in India, Europe, and North America. The vastanavids resemble parrots and the extinct parrot relative Quercypsitta in their morphology, including the partially zygodactyl foot, in which two toes could face opposite the other two.

== Description ==
The Vastanavidae have a distinctive, parrot-like appearance. Notable anatomic features include a coracoid with a deep pit for the ball-and-socket joint of the shoulder, comparable to that of Quercypsitta. The humerus is built in a manner resembling birds of prey like hawks and falcons. The tarsometatarsus, the leg bone immediately above the foot, is short and stocky. Vastanavids had partially zygodactyl feet, as shown by skeletal features of the tarsometatarsus. The phylogenetic affinities of vastanavids are not well known, nor their ecologies. The feet of Avolatavis and Eurofluvioviridavis may have been adapted for grasping.

== Distribution ==
Vastanavid birds have been found from three continents. Sites bearing vastanavid material include the Cambay Shale Formation in Gujarat province, India, where numerous bones of two species of Vastanavis have been found in a lignite mine. Another vastanavid, Avolatavis, is known from the Green River Formation in the United States as well as the London Clay of the United Kingdom. The Geisel Valley of Germany has produced the vastanavid Eurofluvioviridavis.
