= Avolatavis =

Avolatavis Temporal range: Eocene

Scientific classification
- Kingdom: Animalia
- Phylum: Chordata
- Class: Aves
- Clade: Psittacopasseres
- Genus: †Avolatavis; Ksepka & Clarke, 2012

Type species
- †Avolatavis tenens Ksepka & Clarke, 2012

Other species
- †A. europaeus Mayr & Kitchener, 2023

Extinct genus of birds

Avolatavis is an extinct genus of stem-parrot (pan-psittaciform) or a member of the stem group of Psittacopasseres (the clade including both parrots and passerines), known from the early Eocene Fossil Butte Member of the Green River Formation of Wyoming, United States, and from the London Clay of Walton-on-the-Naze (Essex, United Kingdom). It was first named by Daniel T. Ksepka and Julia A. Clarke in 2012 and the type species is Avolatavis tenens. Gerald Mayr and Andrew C. Kitchener described the second species, A. europaeus, in 2023. Mayr and Kitchener assigned Avolatavis to the family Vastanavidae, which might be early diverging stem group presentatives of Pan-Psittaciformes or stem group representatives of Psittacopasseres.
