= Protocypselomorphus =

Protocypselomorphus Temporal range: Lutetian

Scientific classification
- Kingdom: Animalia
- Phylum: Chordata
- Class: Aves
- Genus: †Protocypselomorphus; Mayr, 2005
- Species: †P. manfredkelleri

Binomial name
- †Protocypselomorphus manfredkelleri Mayr, 2005

Extinct genus of birds

Protocypselomorphus is an extinct genus of cypselomorph bird that lived during the Lutetian stage of the Eocene epoch.

== Distribution ==
Protocypselomorphus manfredkelleri fossils are known from the Messel Formation of Germany.
