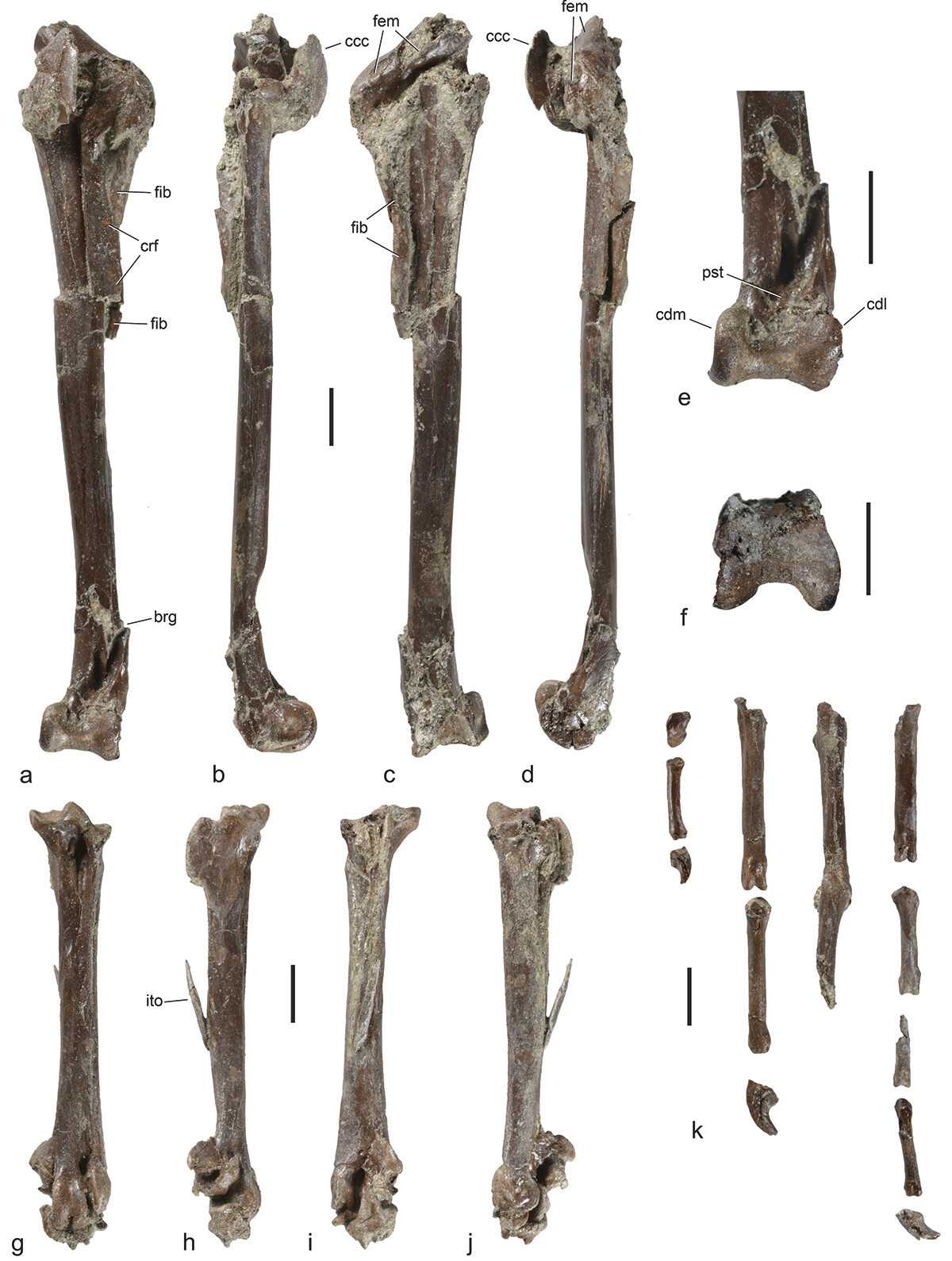
- Holotype leg bones

Scientific classification
- Kingdom: Animalia
- Phylum: Chordata
- Class: Aves
- Order: Anseriformes
- Superfamily: Anatoidea
- Family: Anatidae
- Genus: †Allgoviachen; Mayr, Lechner & Böhme, 2022
- Species: †A. tortonica

Binomial name
- †Allgoviachen tortonica Mayr, Lechner & Böhme, 2022

= Allgoviachen =

Allgoviachen Temporal range: Miocene, (Tortonian), 11.44 Ma

Extinct genus of birds

Allgoviachen (meaning "Allgäu goose") is an extinct genus of anatid bird from the Late Miocene (Tortonian) Hammerschmiede clay pits of Bavaria, Germany. The genus contains a single species, A. tortonica, known from bones belonging to the left leg.

== Discovery and naming ==
The Allgoviachen holotype specimen, SNSB-BSPG 2020 XCIV 1058, was discovered in the Hammerschmiede clay pits of the Allgäu region, near Pforzen, Bavaria, Germany. This specimen consists of the distal femur, tibiotarsus, tarsometatarsus, and most pedal phalanges of the left leg, found in articulation. Specimen GPIT/AV/00143, an incomplete distal left tarsometatarsus, was also assigned to Allgoviachen.

In 2022, Gerald Mayr, Thomas Lechner, and Madelaine Böhme described Allgoviachen tortonica, a new genus and species of antatid, based on these fossil remains. The generic name, Allgoviachen, combines the Latin "Allgäu", a reference to the type locality, with the Greek "chen," meaning "goose". The specific name, "tortonica", refers to the Tortonian age of the type specimen.

== Description ==
The describing authors concluded that Allgoviachen would have had a body size comparable to the extant anserine Anser indicus (Bar-headed goose) and anatine Alopochen aegyptiaca (Egyptian goose), with an estimated body mass of about 2 kilograms (4.4 lb).
