= Baselrallus =

Baselrallus Temporal range: Early Miocene

Scientific classification
- Kingdom: Animalia
- Phylum: Chordata
- Class: Aves
- Order: Gruiformes
- Family: Rallidae
- Genus: †Baselrallus
- Species: †B. intermedius

Binomial name
- †Baselrallus intermedius De Pietri & Mayr, 2014

Extinct genus of birds

Baselrallus is an extinct genus of rallid that lived during the Early Miocene.

== Distribution ==
Baselrallus intermedius fossils are known from the fossil site of Saint-Gérand-le-Puy in France.
