= Ypresicolius =

Ypresicolius Temporal range: Ypresian

Scientific classification
- Kingdom: Animalia
- Phylum: Chordata
- Class: Aves
- Order: Coliiformes
- Genus: †Ypresicolius
- Species: †Y. sandcoleiformis

Binomial name
- †Ypresicolius sandcoleiformis Mayr & Kitchener, 2024

Extinct genus of birds

Ypresicolius is an extinct genus of coliiform bird that lived during the Ypresian stage of the Eocene epoch.

== Distribution ==
Ypresicolius sandcoleiformis fossils are known from Walton-on-the-Naze, a fossil site stratigraphically located in the Walton Member of the London Clay Formation.
