= Vastanavis =

Vastanavis Temporal range: Early Eocene

Scientific classification
- Kingdom: Animalia
- Phylum: Chordata
- Class: Aves
- Family: †Vastanavidae
- Genus: †Vastanavis; Mayr et al., 2007

Type species
- †Vastanavis eocaena Mayr et al., 2007

Other species
- †Vastanavis cambayensis Mayr et al., 2010

Extinct genus of birds

Vastanavis is a genus of parrot-like bird that lived in what is now western India in the Early Eocene. It contains two species, Vastanavis eocaena and Vastanavis cambayensis; both are known from the Cambay Formation. Vastanavis was at least semi-zygodactyl, and most likely arboreal.
