= Consoravis =

Consoravis Temporal range: Ypresian

Scientific classification
- Kingdom: Animalia
- Phylum: Chordata
- Class: Aves
- Family: †Morsoravidae
- Genus: †Consoravis
- Species: †C. turdirostris

Binomial name
- †Consoravis turdirostris Ksepka et al., 2025

Consoravis is an extinct genus of morsoravid that inhabited North America during the Ypresian stage of the Eocene epoch.

== Distribution ==
Consoravis turdirostris is known from the Green River Formation of Wyoming.
