= Chambicuculus =

Chambicuculus Temporal range: Lutetian

Scientific classification
- Kingdom: Animalia
- Phylum: Chordata
- Class: Aves
- Order: Cuculiformes
- Family: Cuculidae
- Genus: †Chambicuculus
- Species: †C. pusillus

Binomial name
- †Chambicuculus pusillus Mourer-Chauviré et al., 2013

Extinct genus of birds

Chambicuculus is an extinct genus of cuculid that lived during the Eocene epoch.

== Distribution ==
Chambicuculus pusillus is known from the Chambi Formation of Tunisia.
