= Notoleptos =

Notoleptos Temporal range: Late Eocene

Scientific classification
- Kingdom: Animalia
- Phylum: Chordata
- Class: Aves
- Order: Procellariiformes
- Family: Diomedeidae
- Genus: †Notoleptos
- Species: †N. giglii

Binomial name
- †Notoleptos giglii Acosta Hospitaleche and Gelfo, 2017

Extinct genus of procellariiform bird

Notoleptos is an extinct monotypic genus of diomedeid bird that lived in Antarctica during the Priabonian stage of the Eocene epoch.

== Etymology ==
The two parts of the generic name of Notoleptos giglii are derived from the Ancient Greek 'nóto' meaning 'South' and 'leptos' meaning 'gracile'. The specific epithet is in reference to Silvia Moreda de Gigli, the secretary of the Argentinian Paleontological Association from 1987 to 2015.
