= Phalcoboenus napieri =

Phalcoboenus napieri Temporal range: Holocene

Scientific classification
- Domain: Eukaryota
- Kingdom: Animalia
- Phylum: Chordata
- Class: Aves
- Order: Falconiformes
- Family: Falconidae
- Genus: Phalcoboenus
- Species: †P. napieri

Binomial name
- †Phalcoboenus napieri Adams & Woods, 2016

Extinct species of bird

Phalcoboenus napieri is an extinct species of Phalcoboenus that inhabited the Falkland Islands during the Holocene epoch.
