= Chionoides =

Chionoides Temporal range: Late Oligocene

Scientific classification
- Kingdom: Animalia
- Phylum: Chordata
- Class: Aves
- Order: Charadriiformes
- Genus: †Chionoides
- Species: †C. australiensis

Binomial name
- †Chionoides australiensis De Pietri et al., 2016

Extinct genus of charadriiform bird

Chionoides is an extinct monotypic genus of charadriiform bird that lived in Australia during the Chattian stage of the Oligocene epoch.

== Etymology ==
The generic name Chionoides references the apparent similarity of the taxon to the genus Chionis. The specific epithet of the type species, Chionoides australiensis, references the continent of Australia.
