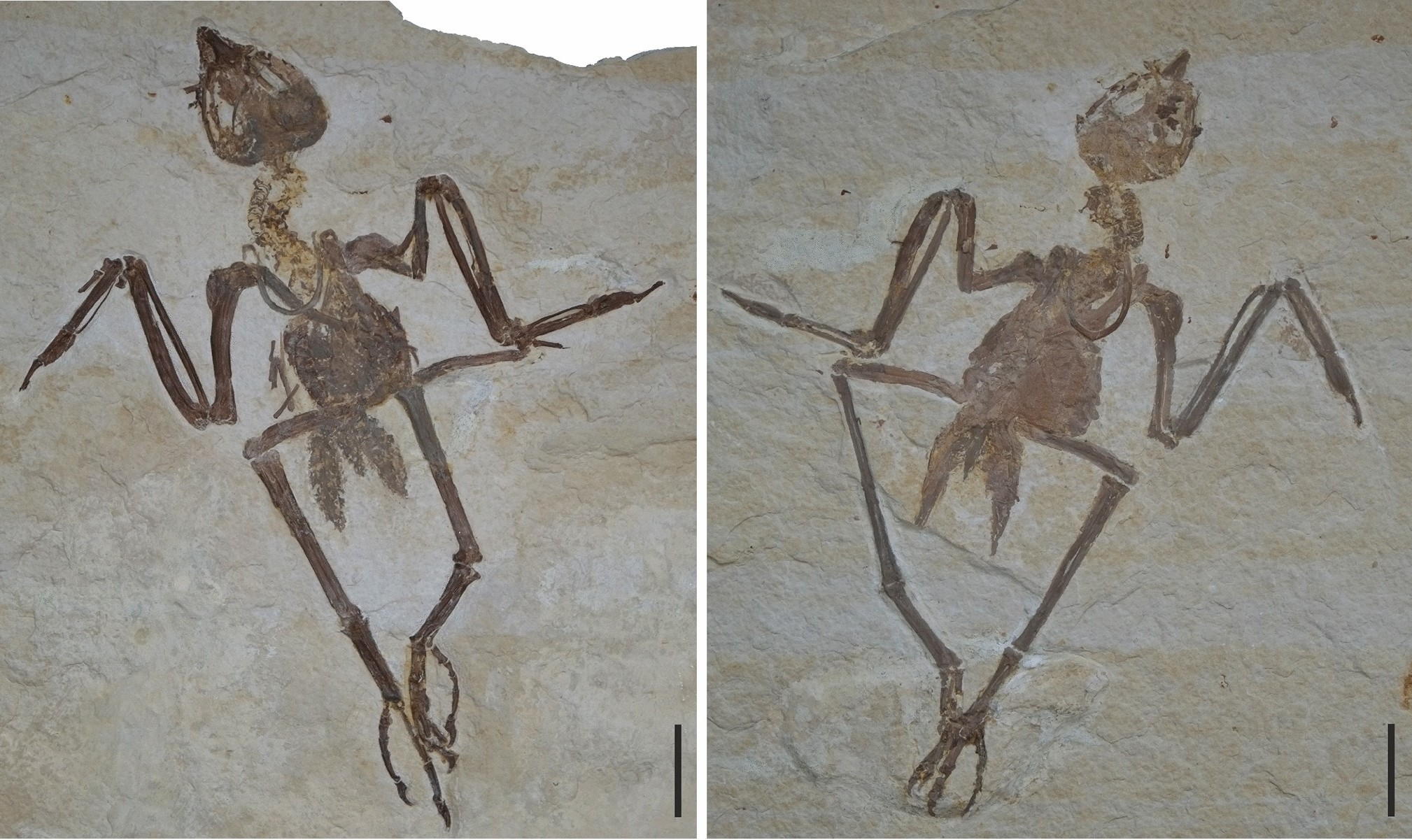
- Tynskya eocaena

Scientific classification
- Kingdom: Animalia
- Phylum: Chordata
- Class: Aves
- Clade: Australaves
- Clade: Eufalconimorphae
- Family: †Messelasturidae; Mayr 2005

Genera
- †Messelastur; †Tynskya

= Messelasturidae =

Messelasturidae Temporal range: Eocene Eocene (possible Paleocene representative)

Extinct family of birds

Messelasturidae is an extinct family of birds known from the Eocene of North America and Europe. Their morphology is a mosaic that in some aspects are very similar to modern hawks and falcons, but in others are more similar to parrots. Initially interpreted as stem-owls, more recent studies have suggested a closer relationship to parrots and passerines. Their ecology is enigmatic.

== Description ==
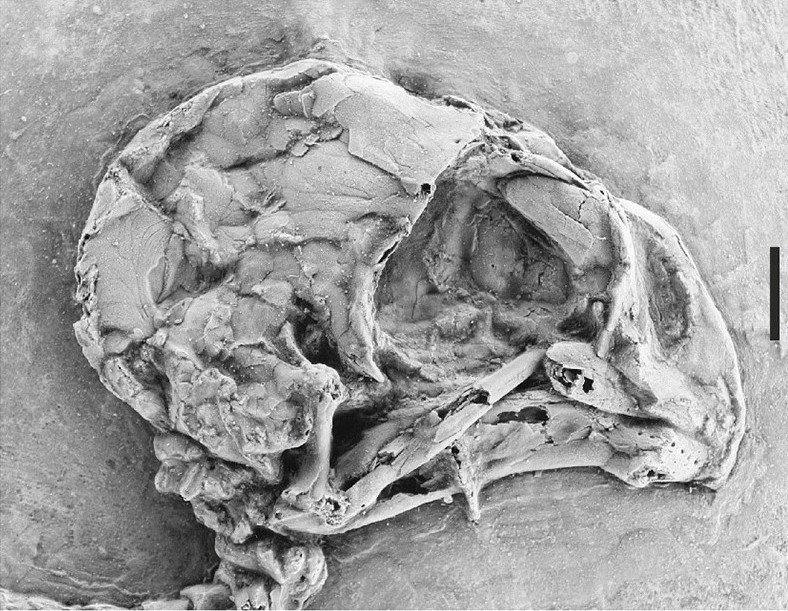
Skull of Messelastur gratulator

On the skull, Messelasturidae possessed a raptorial beak and a large supraorbital process.

On the feet, messelasturids lacked an ossified supratendineal bridge on the distal tibiotarsus. They also featured raptorlike ungual phalanges.

They were likely ground dwelling carnivores. They existed at an age range of 61.7 to 40.4 Ma.

Tynskya is characterized by a distinctive morphology of the tarsometatarsus.

== Discovery and classification ==
Messelastur gratulator was originally described in 1994 from two skulls with associated vertebrae, found in the Eocene aged Messel pit, Germany. Tynskya eocaena was described from specimens found in the Eocene aged Green River Formation in the western United States by Gerald Mayr in 2000, with indeterminate similar remains also being noted from the equivalently aged London Clay of southern England. In 2005, a more complete skeleton of Messelastur was described, and it and Tynskya were placed into their own family Messelasturidae by Mayr, as the sister group of Strigiformes or possibly Falconiformes. An additional specimen of Messelastur from Messel pit was described in 2011 by Mayr, finding that Messelasturidae was closely related to the extinct family Halcyornithidae, and both were likely stem-groups to Psittaciformes. A study in 2021 described a new species of Tynskya, T. waltonensis from the London Clay. A phylogenetic analysis constrained to molecular data conducted in the study found messelasturids closely related to Psittacopasserae, the clade containing Passeriformes and Psittaciformes, but a sister group relationship with Halcyornithidae was not recovered.

== Ecology ==
Due to the mosaic nature of the morphology of messelasturids, their ecology is difficult to assess. It is likely they had a specialised feeding ecology. It is unlikely that they regularly searched the ground for food or engaged in hawking via sallying flights from perches. It is possible that they had a raptorial ecology, and hard shelled invertebrates have also been suggested as a food source, but other items like fruit and seeds cannot be ruled out.

== Distribution ==
Fossils of Messelastur are known from Germany (Messel). Tynskya remains have been found in the US (Green River Formation), and in the UK (London Clay), illustrating the resemblance between the early Eocene birds of North America and Europe. Indeterminate messelasturid remains have also been reported from the early Eocene Nanjemoy Formation of Virginia in the United States. An indeterminate bird from the Paleocene aged Menat maar deposit in France bears similarities to both Messelasturidae and Halcyornithidae.
