= Psittacopedidae =

Psittacopedidae Temporal range: Eocene

Scientific classification
- Kingdom: Animalia
- Phylum: Chordata
- Class: Aves
- Clade: Psittacopasseres
- Clade: Passerimorphae
- Family: †Psittacopedidae; Mayr, 2015

Genera
- †Eofringillirostrum; †Parapsittacopes; †Psittacomimus; †Psittacopes

Extinct family of birds

Psittacopedidae is an extinct family of birds related to passerines. It had zygodactyl feet, likely due to common ancestry with parrots, the closest living relatives of passerines.
