= Morsoravis =

Morsoravis Temporal range: Early Eocene

Scientific classification
- Kingdom: Animalia
- Phylum: Chordata
- Class: Aves
- Family: †Morsoravidae
- Genus: †Morsoravis; Bertelli et al., 2010
- Species: †M. sedilis

Binomial name
- †Morsoravis sedilis (Bertelli et al. 2010)

Extinct genus of birds

Morsoravis is an extinct genus of neoavian bird from the Early Eocene Fur Formation of Denmark. It contains a single named species, Morsoravis sedilis. Fossils of Morsoravis have also been found in the Green River Formation of Wyoming and possibly the Nanjemoy Formation of Virginia.

== Discovery and naming ==
The holotype of Morsoravis, MGUH 28930, consists of a complete but fully articulated and three-dimensionally preserved skeleton, found in the marine Fur Formation of Denmark. There are several fish bones preserved within the body of the bird, although there are also other fish fossils surrounding the specimen. The fossil was collected from a site on the northwestern corner of the island of Mors, at the base of a cliff.

Although Morsoravis belongs to its own family, Morsoravidae, and is related to the Psittacopedidae, it was first formally described as a relative of the Charadriiformes by Bertelli et al. in 2010. Before that, it had been the subject of research in two unpublished doctoral theses in 2002 and 2007. Additionally, it had been inadequately described as a nomen nudum under the name "Morsoravis sedile" in Dyke & Tuinen (2004).

The generic name Morsoravis comes from Mors, the name of the island on which the holotype was collected, Latin sor, meaning "shore", and avis, meaning bird. The specific ephitet, sedilis, is from Latin "sedere", meaining to sit still, and ilis, expressing capability, referencing Morsoravis' capability to perch.

A fossil from the Green River Formation in Wyoming belongs to an unnamed species of Morsoravis, and preserves the forelimbs, unlike the holotype. Remains of Morsoravis-like bone fragments have been found from the Nanjemoy Formation of Virginia, United States. However, the fragmentary nature of these specimens prohibits confident assignment to the genus. A further specimen from the Fur Formation, preserving elements of the wing and pectoral area not found in the holotype, belongs to Morsoravis, but it is now lost.

== Description ==
Morsoravis had a rounded head totalling about 31.8 mm (1.25 in), of which about half is accounted for by the relatively long beak, with a rounded braincase. The beak is straight and pointed at its tip, and has an elongated nostril. The beak is schizorhinal, suggesting the possibility of rhynchokinetism of the rostrum. The orbit is about the size of the braincase, and the scleral ring is made of 12 segments. The interorbital septum, the bone between the two orbits, has a single fenestra. There is either a very weakly developed basipterygoid process or none at all. The skull of the holotype preserves many details of the inner ear and surrounding area well.

In Morsoravis there are 21 presacral vertebrae, that is, vertebrae cranial of the synsacrum, which exhibit a pleurocoelous condition. There are 11 synsacral vertebrae and a further 7 caudal vertebrae. The pygostyle is large. The pelvis is incompletely fused to the synsacrum, which is true of adult Morsoravis.

The tarsometatarsus is highly similar to that of Pumiliornis, a psittacopedid bird, and features an accessary trochlea of the trochlea of the fourth metatarsal, indicative of at least semi-zygodactyly. The hallux is relatively long and has a large, curved claw, and the proportions of the toes are not characteristic of ground-dwelling birds. The semi-zygodactyl foot also has a second toe with relatively little freedom of side-to-side motion, likely an adaptation for climbing.

== Classification ==
The history of the classification of Morsoravis is convoluted. Dyke & van Tuinen (2004) figured the holotype of Morsoravis and classified it as a charadriiform bird, but provided no formal description, making their name, "Morsoravis sedile", a nomen nudum. The first formal description of the bird, by Bertelli et al., agreed with this assessment, partially due to details of the vertebrae. Mayr (2011) classified the bird together with Pumiliornis, and Mayr (2015) included Morsoravis in the new family Psittacopedidae. With new fossil evidence from the new genus Sororavis, Mayr (2023) described a new family, Morsoravidae, with Morsoravis as the type genus, and including Pumiliornis and Sororavis, to the exclusion of the other birds previously described as psittacopedids.
