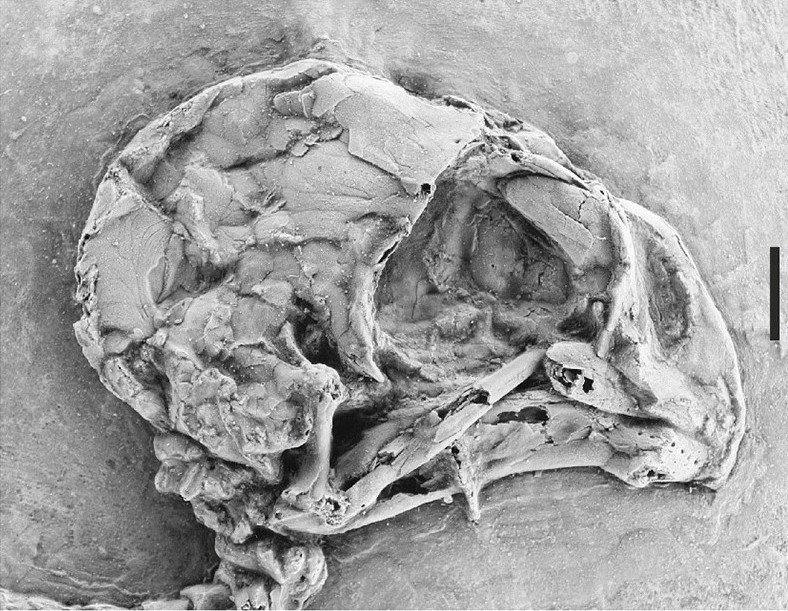
- Skull of Messelastur gratulator

Scientific classification
- Kingdom: Animalia
- Phylum: Chordata
- Class: Aves
- Order: †Halcyornithiformes
- Family: †Messelasturidae
- Genus: †Messelastur; Peters, 1994

Type species
- †Messelastur gratulator (Peters, 1994)

= Messelastur =

Messelastur Temporal range: Middle Eocene

Extinct genus of birds

Messelastur is a genus of messelasturid bird. It is known from the Messel pit of Germany, which dates to the Eocene.
