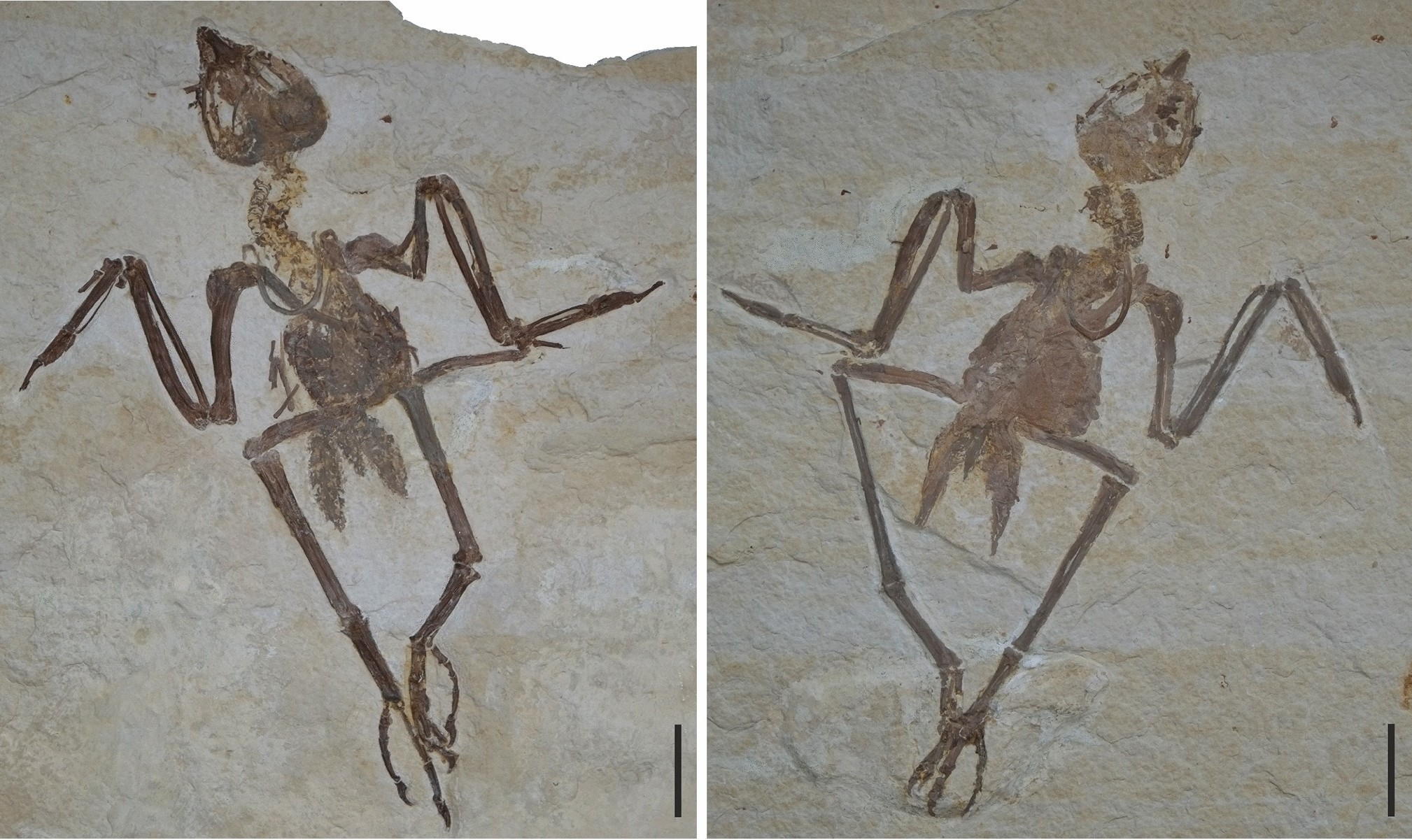
- Tynskya eocaena

Scientific classification
- Kingdom: Animalia
- Phylum: Chordata
- Class: Aves
- Clade: Eufalconimorphae
- Family: †Messelasturidae
- Genus: †Tynskya; Mayr, 2000

Type species
- †Tynskya eocaena (Mayr, 2000)

Other species
- †T. brevitarsus Mayr & Kitchener, 2023; †T. crassitarsus Mayr & Kitchener, 2023; †T. waltonensis Mayr, 2021

= Tynskya =

Tynskya Temporal range: Early Eocene

Extinct genus of birds

Tynskya is an extinct genus of messelasturid bird.

== Discovery and Naming ==
Tynskya was first described in 2000 by Gerald Mayr. This would be based on an incomplete specimen loaned by Peter Wellehnhofer of the Bavarian State Collection for Paleontology and Historical Geology. The holotype BSP 1997 I 6 is an incomplete articulated skeleton, dug up in Tynsky quarry in the Green River formation, Wyoming, USA. Another referred specimen (WN 96939) was found in London Clay based on isolated bones. The genus name was named after the quarry it was found in and the epithet was named after the time period the species lived in.

Then in 2021 another species T. waltonensis described based on a partial skeleton. The holotype SMF Av 652 is a specimen originally found in Walton-on-the-Naze, London Clay in 1986 by Paul Bergdhal which was originally categorized as BC 8611. The epithet is named after the type locality.

Then in 2023, two other species would be described T. crassitarsus and T. brevitarsus, both being described by partial skeletons. Both the holotypes, the former NMS.Z.2021.40.73 and latter NMS.Z.2021.40.78 were found in the Walton-on-the-Naze, London Clay. The epithet for T. crassitarsus is derived from the Latin word crassus which means "thick" and refers to its thick tarsometatarsus and the epithet for T. brevitarsus is derived from the Latin word brevis which means "short", referring to the species short tarsometatarsus.

== Distribution ==
T. eocaena, the type species, is known from fossils found in the North American Green River Formation. The Walton Member of the London Clay Formation of England contains the species T. waltonensis, along with the more recently described T. brevitarsus and T. crassitarsus.
