= Psittacopes =

Psittacopes Temporal range: Middle Eocene

Scientific classification
- Kingdom: Animalia
- Phylum: Chordata
- Class: Aves
- Family: †Psittacopedidae
- Genus: †Psittacopes; Mayr & Daniels, 1998

Species
- †P. lepidus Mayr & Daniels, 1998; †?P. occidentalis Mayr & Kitchener, 2022

Extinct genus of birds

Psittacopes is an extinct genus of bird from Middle Eocene. One species is recorded from Messel, Germany (P. lepidus), and other three possible species are from London Clay, England, one named ?Psittacopes occidentalis in 2022, and the other two unnamed. Its phylogenetic placement within Aves is uncertain; it was originally interpreted as a parrot, but the phylogenetic analysis conducted by Mayr (2015) recovered it as more closely related to the passerines and the extinct family Zygodactylidae.
