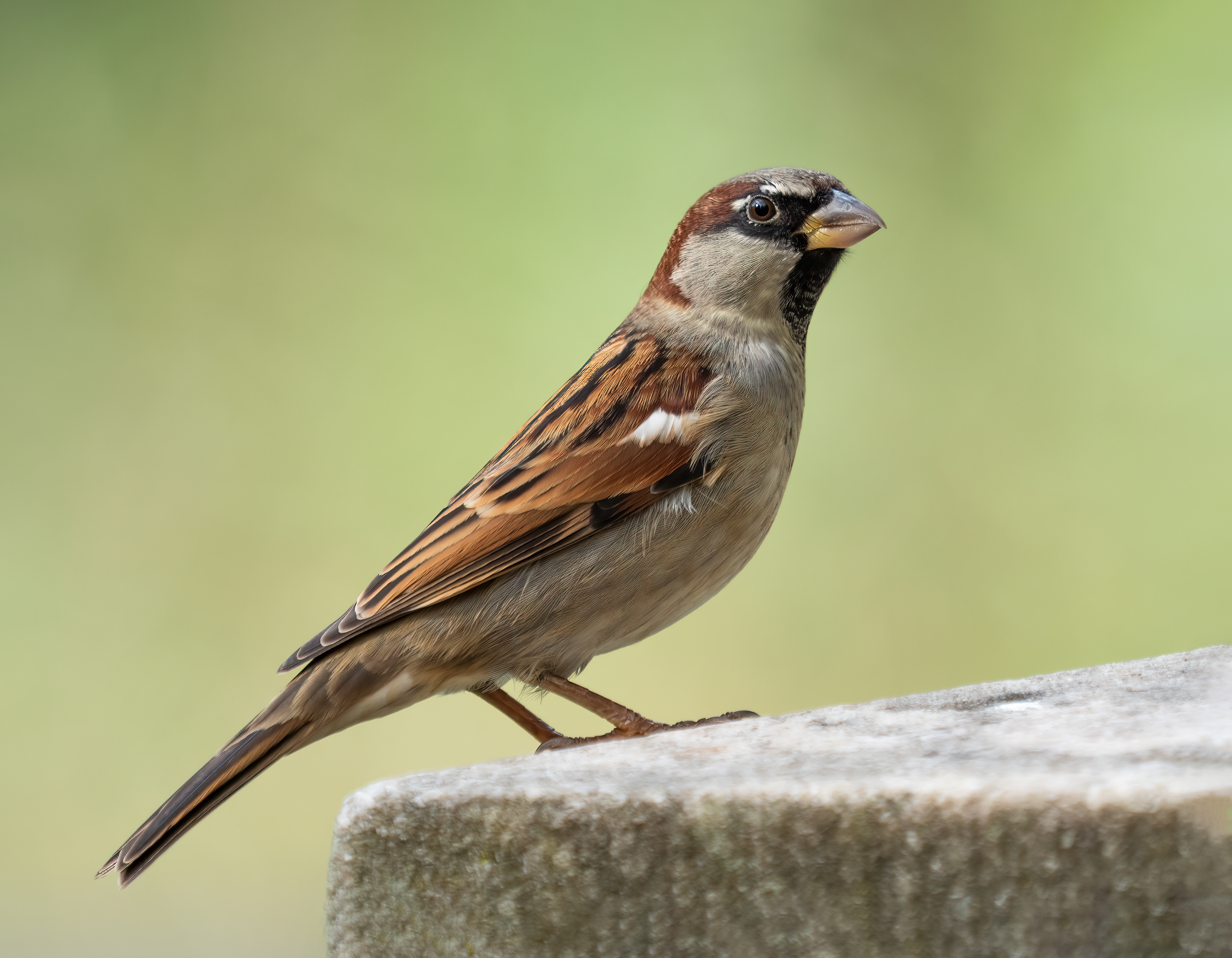
- House sparrow, Passer domesticus
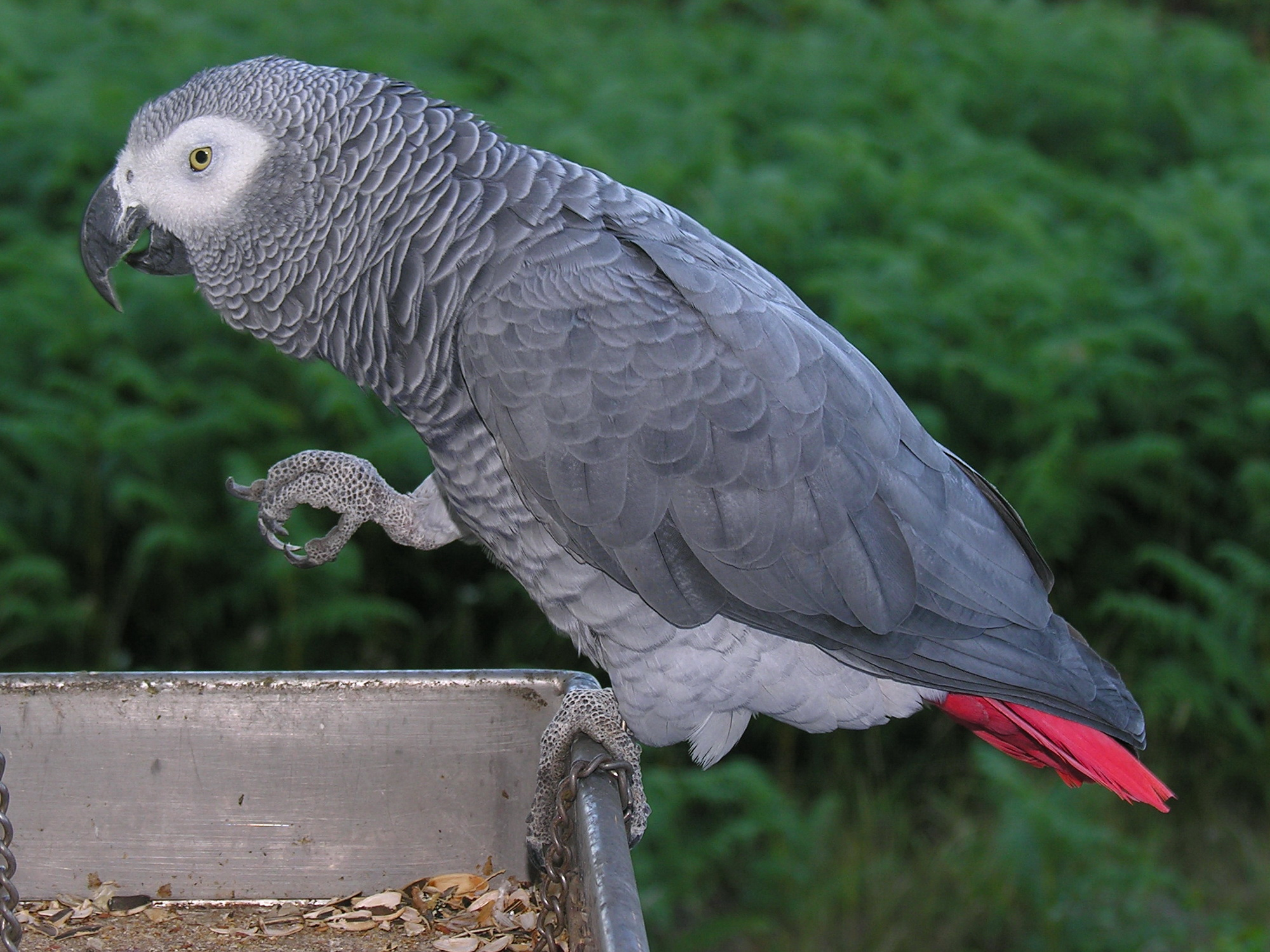
- Grey parrot, Psittacus erithacus

Scientific classification
- Kingdom: Animalia
- Phylum: Chordata
- Class: Aves
- Clade: Eufalconimorphae
- Clade: Psittacopasseres; Suh et al., 2011

Subtaxa
- †Vastanavidae; ?†Messelasturithiformes; †Messelasturidae; ?†Halcyornithidae; Panpsittaciformes Mayr, 2010; †Quercypsittidae; Psittaciformes; Panpasseriformes Linnaeus, 1758 emmend. Ksepka, Mayr, & Grande, 2019; †Morsoravidae; †Psittacomimidae; †Psittacopedidae; Parapasseres Mayr, 2015; †Zygodactylidae; Passeriformes

Synonyms
- Psittacopasserae Suh et al., 2011

= Psittacopasseres =

Psittacopasseres Temporal range: Early Eocene – Holocene, 54–0 Ma Possibly an earlier origin based on molecular clock

Clade of birds

Psittacopasseres is a taxon of birds consisting of the Passeriformes (passerines, a large group of perching birds) and Psittaciformes (parrots). Per Ericson and colleagues, in analysing genomic DNA, revealed a lineage comprising passerines, psittacines and Falconiformes. The group was proposed following an alignment of nuclear intron sequences by Shannon Hackett et al. in 2008. It was formally named as Psittacopasserae in a 2011 Nature Communications article by Alexander Suh and other authors working with Jürgen Schmitz's group, based on genetic analysis of the insertion of retroposons into the genomes of key avian lineages over the course of evolution during the Mesozoic Era. This clade was defined in the PhyloCode by George Sangster and colleagues in 2022 as the least inclusive crown clade containing Psittacus erithacus and Passer domesticus.

== Significance in the evolution of birdsong ==
Passerines are renowned as songbirds (technically this word refers to a clade of passerines), and parrots share a capacity for vocal learning. Thus it is possible that vocal learning, and the corresponding variety of song, was present in a psittacopasseran ancestor.
