= Pumiliornis =

Pumiliornis Temporal range: Middle Eocene

Scientific classification
- Kingdom: Animalia
- Phylum: Chordata
- Class: Aves
- Clade: Australaves
- Family: †Morsoravidae
- Genus: †Pumiliornis; Mayr, 1999

Type species
- †Pumiliornis tessellatus Mayr, 1999

Extinct genus of birds

Pumiliornis tessellatus is an ancient bird from the Middle Eocene of Messel, Hesse, Germany. It is described as a wren-sized anisodactyl bird with a long, slender bill and strong hallux. Its species name tessellatus, meaning "mosaic" in Latin, is a reference to its unusual distribution of characters and uncertain phylogenetic placement. It has some anatomical affinities with Cuculiformes, but similar fossils that might be related to this taxon do not.

In 2014, a new specimen of Pumiliornis was described that showed preserved stomach contents of pollen grains from a eudicotyledonous angiosperm, making it the earliest fossil evidence of flower-visiting behavior in birds.
