= Quercypsitta =

Quercypsitta Temporal range: Late Eocene

Scientific classification
- Kingdom: Animalia
- Phylum: Chordata
- Class: Aves
- Order: Psittaciformes
- Family: †Quercypsittidae; Mourer-Chauviré, 1992
- Genus: †Quercypsitta; Mourer-Chauviré, 1992

Species
- Quercypsitta sudrei Mourer-Chauviré, 1992 (type); Quercypsitta ivani Mourer-Chauviré, 1992

Extinct genus of birds

Quercypsitta is a genus of prehistoric bird from the Late Eocene (circa 37-34 Mya) Quercy phosphorites in France.

Known from rather fragmentary remains (some foot and wing bones for the type species Q. sudrei, three coracoids for the species Q. ivani), it was described as a parrot sufficiently distinct to be included in its own family, the Quercypsittidae. These birds apparently formed an early offshoot of the parrots which spread to Europe and became extinct in the Miocene at latest. This coincided with a period of global cooling, when their relatives - the ancestors of the African and Asian parrots known today - had in the meantime settled the warmer areas south of the Quercypsittidae's distribution.

The genus Palaeopsittacus is sometimes included in the Quercypsittidae together with Quercypsitta, but it is not certain that the former was indeed a parrot.
