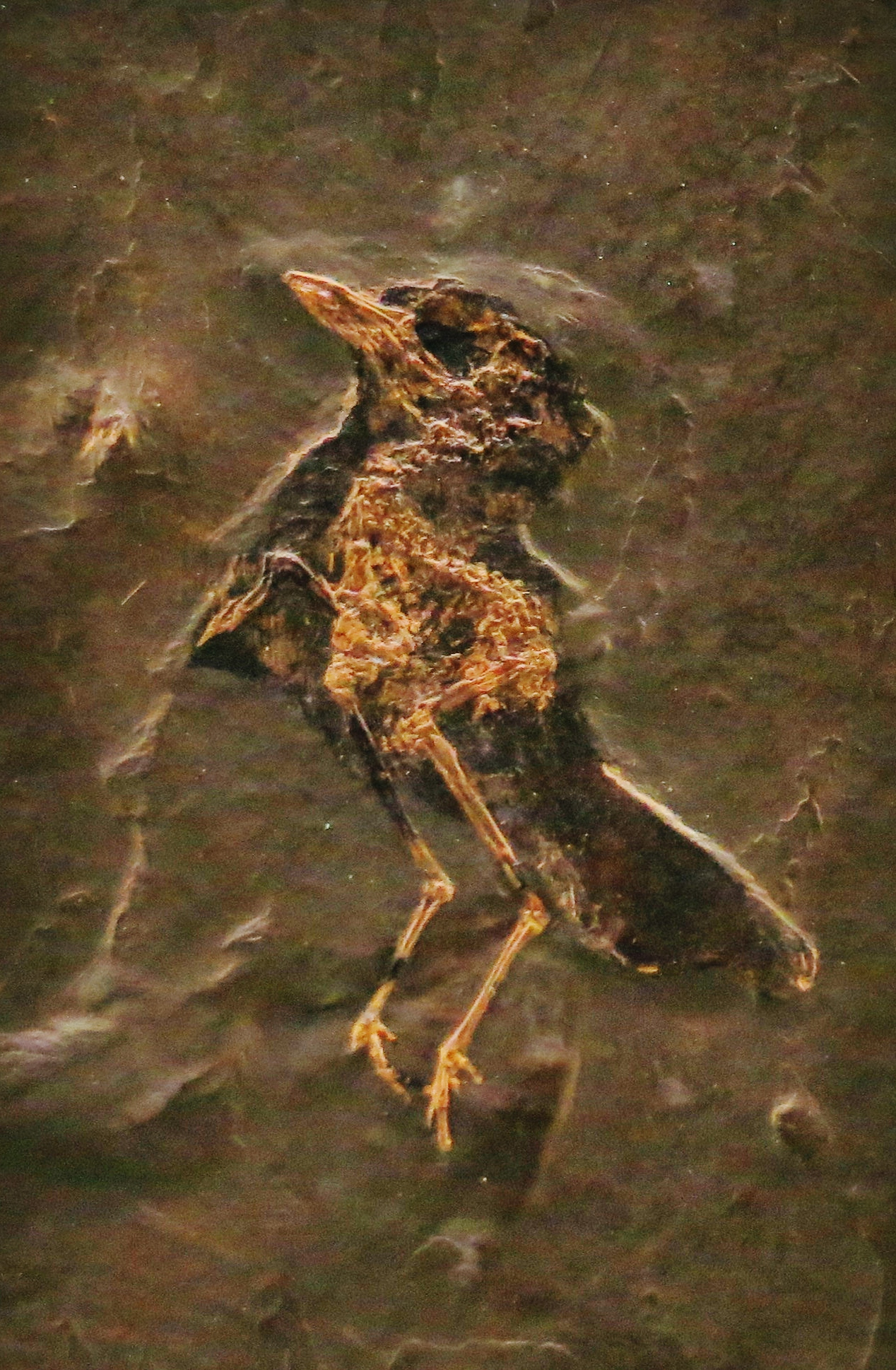
- Primozygodactylus

Scientific classification
- Kingdom: Animalia
- Phylum: Chordata
- Class: Aves
- Clade: Psittacopasseres
- Family: †Zygodactylidae; Brodkorb, 1971

Genera
- †Eozygodactylus †Primoscens †Primozygodactylus †Zygodactylus

Synonyms
- Primoscenidae Mayr 1998

= Zygodactylidae =

Zygodactylidae Temporal range: Eocene to Middle Miocene

Extinct family of birds

Zygodactylidae is a family of extinct birds found in Europe and North America from the Eocene epoch to the Middle Miocene. First named in 1971, based on fragmentary remains of two species from Germany, a more complete description of the birds became possible in 2008 when a number of other, better-preserved fossil species were assigned to the family based on a number of shared characteristics.

The name of the group comes from the presence of a zygodactyl foot, with two toes projecting forward, and two to the rear. This is the same arrangement as seen in living parrots and woodpeckers, and the zygodactylids were at one time thought to be related to the woodpecker family. More recent analyses, however, have shown that they are more likely to be the sister clade to the passerine or "perching" birds, the large clade that includes, among others, all living songbirds. Passerine birds are distinguished by an anisodactyl foot, but it is thought that their earliest ancestors may have been zygodactyl, likely using this arrangement of toes to cling to the bark of trees as woodpeckers do. Only later did the fourth toe rotate from the rear to face forward in the modern passerine fashion.

== Species ==
† Family Zygodactylidae

- Genus Eozygodactylus, Weidig 2010
  - Eozygodactylus americanus, Weidig 2010
- Genus Primoscens, Harrison & Walker 1977
  - Primoscens minutus, Harrison & Walker 1977
- Genus Primozygodactylus, Mayr 1998
  - Primozygodactylus ballmanni, Mayr 1998
  - Primozygodactylus danielsi, Mayr 1998
  - Primozygodactylus eunjooae, Mayr & Zelenkov 2009
  - Primozygodactylus major, Mayr 1998
  - Primozygodactylus quintus, Mayr 2017
- Genus Zygodactylus, Ballmann 1969
  - Zygodactylus grandei, Smith, DeBee & Clark 2018
  - Zygodactylus grivensis, Ballmann 1969
  - Zygodactylus ignotus, Ballmann 1969
  - Zygodactylus ochlurus, Hieronymus, Waugh & Clarke 2019
