= Gerald Mayr =

German palaeontologist

Gerald Mayr is a German palaeontologist who is Curator of Ornithology at the Senckenberg Research Institute in Frankfurt am Main, Hesse. He has published extensively on fossil birds, especially the Paleogene avifauna of Europe. He is an expert on the Eocene fauna of the Messel pit.

In 2022, alongside Thomas Lechner and Madelaine Böhme, Mayr described Allgoviachen tortonica, a new genus and species of anatid bird from the Hammerschmiede clay pits of Bavaria, Germany.

Below is a list of taxa that Mayr has contributed to naming:

Year	Taxon	Authors
2025	Pseudocrypturus gracilipes sp. nov.	Mayr & Kitchener
2025	Pseudocrypturus danielsi sp. nov.	Mayr & Kitchener
2024	Lumbrerornis rougieri gen. et sp. nov.	Bertelli, Giannini, García-López, Deraco, Babot, Del Papa, Armella, Herrera, & Mayr
2024	Ypresicolius sandcoleiformis gen. et sp. nov.	Mayr & Kitchener
2023	Tynskya crassitarsus sp. nov.	Mayr & Kitchener
2023	Tynskya brevitarsus sp. nov.	Mayr & Kitchener
2023	Perplexicervix paucituberculata sp. nov.	Mayr, Carrió, & Kitchener
2023	Eotrogon stenorhynchus gen. et sp. nov.	Mayr, De Pietri, & Kitchener
2022	Allgoviachen tortonica gen. et sp. nov.	Mayr, Lechner, & Böhme
2021	Tynskya waltonensis sp. nov.	Mayr
2021	Archaeodromus anglicus gen. et sp. nov.	Mayr
2020	Aviraptor longicrus gen. et sp. nov.	Mayr & Hurum
2020	Primoptynx poliotauros gen. et sp. nov.	Mayr, Gingerich, & Smith
2014	Baselrallus intermedius gen. et sp. nov.	De Pietri & Mayr
2013	Qianshanornis rapax gen. et sp. nov.	Mayr, Yang, De Bast, Li, & Smith
2011	Hoazinavis lacustris gen. et sp. nov.	Mayr, Alvarenga, & Mourer-Chauviré
2006	Masillaraptor parvunguis gen. et sp. nov.	Mayr
2005	Protocypselomorphus manfredkelleri gen. et sp. nov.	Mayr
2000	Tynskya eocaena gen. et sp. nov.	Mayr
