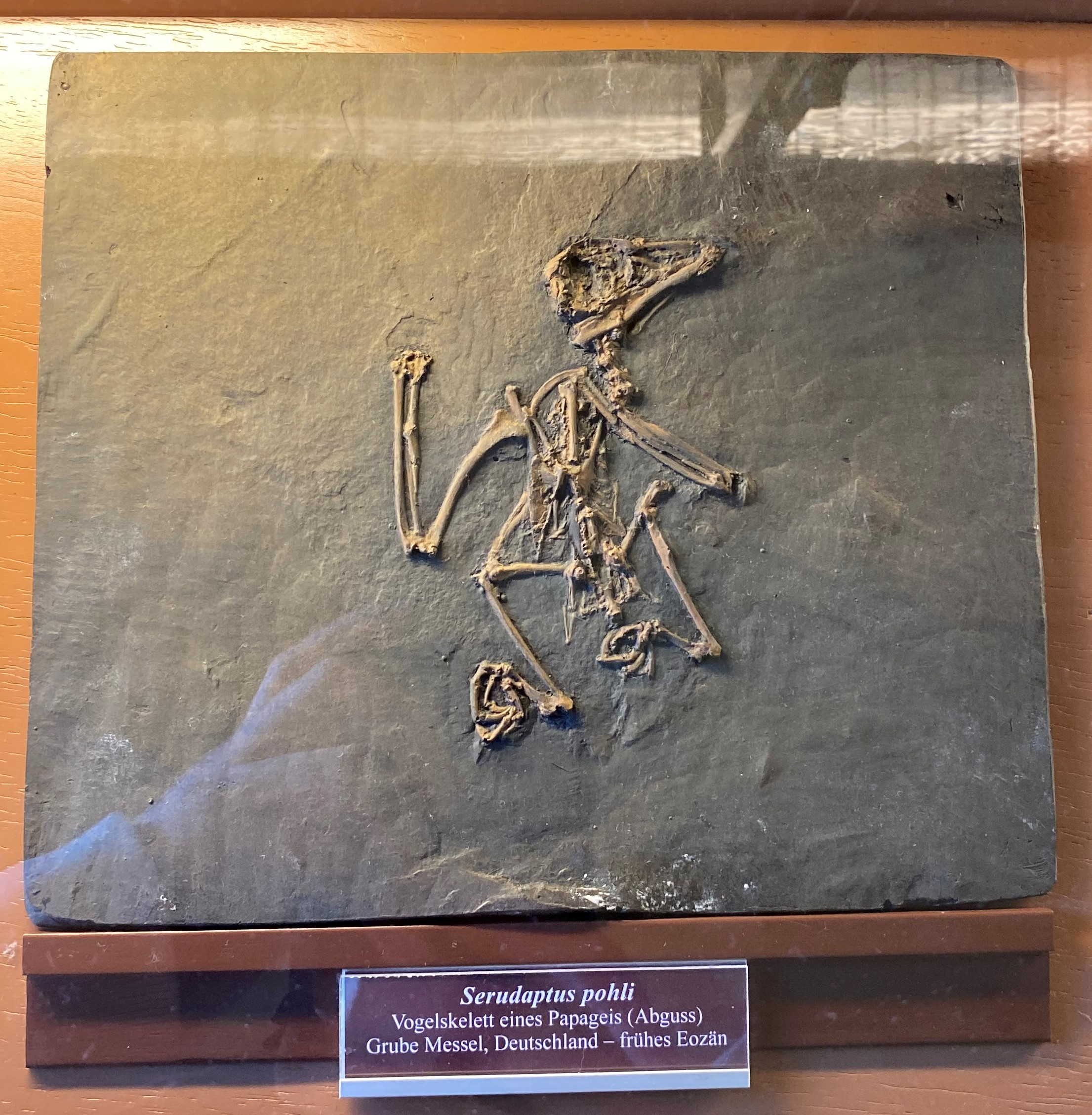
- Cast of the holotype of Serudaptus at the Natural History Museum of Vienna

Scientific classification
- Kingdom: Animalia
- Phylum: Chordata
- Class: Aves
- Clade: Eufalconimorphae
- Family: †Halcyornithidae
- Genus: †Serudaptus; Mayr, 2000

Type species
- †Serudaptus pohli (Mayr, 2000)

= Serudaptus =

Serudaptus Temporal range: Middle Eocene

Extinct genus of birds

Serudaptus is an extinct genus of halcyornithid bird from the Middle Eocene Messel pit in Hesse, Germany. The genus contains one species, Serudaptus pohli, and is known for long, raptorial claws on its zygodactyl feet.

== Discovery and naming ==
The holotype of Serudaptus, WDC-C-MG 201, was housed in a private collection prior to its scientific description. The fossil consists of a complete, articulated skeleton, preserved in slab and counter-slab. The bones are somewhat crushed, and there are poorly preserved feather remains. A poorly preserved specimen, SMF-ME 1283, initially described as an indeterminate halcyornithid, could belong to Serupdatus.

Serudaptus pohli was described in 2002 as a relative of Pseudasturides and a member of the Halcyornithidae, then known as the Pseudasturidae. The generic name is an anagram of Pseudastur, the invalid former name of the genus Pseudasturides. The specific ephitet pohli honours Burhkhard Pohl, who made the holotype available for study.

== Description ==
Serudaptus was a large-headed bird, although the body is proportionally larger relative to the head than in its relative Pseudasturides. Serudaptus was distinctly larger than both Pseudasturides macrocephalus and Cyrilavis olsoni. The beak makes up about half of the length of the skull, longer than in Pseudasturides, and has a relatively straight culmen. Feather impressions preserve a crest of feathers on the head. The mandible is elongated, like in other Halcyornithidae, and much longer than in messlasturids. The humerus is slender. The tarsometatarsus is short and stout. Like other Halcyornithidae, the fourth toe is opposed to the second and third toes in a zygodactyl arrangement, and the third toe is stronger than the others. The claws are long and raptorial. The tibiotarsus features a crest on the medial side, a characteristic shared by modern climbing birds, together with the long claws and short tarsometatarsus suggesting adapatation for a scansorial lifestyle. The raptor-like claws of Serupdaptus may also represent an adaptation for a carnivorous diet, potentially of large invertebrates.

SMF-ME 1283, a poorly preserved halcyornithid specimen, is compared to Serudaptus pohli based on close similarity of the limb proportions. SMF-ME 1283 is smaller than the Serudaptus holotype, and could represent a new species of the genus, a juvenile specimen, or an example of sexual dimorphism in size.

== Classification ==
Serudaptus is a member of the Halcyornithidae, a family of zygodactyl birds currently presumed to be relatives of both the parrots and songbirds. Serudaptus shares with Cyrilavis a messelasturid-like sternum, which may indicate that it is more closely related to it than to Pseudasturides and Pulchrapollia. It is also possible that Serudaptus is more closely related to messelasturids, which also possess long and raptor-like claws; Serudaptus nonetheless shares synapomorphies including a long and slender humerus with the halcyornithids.
