= Pulchrapollia =

Pulchrapollia Temporal range: Early Eocene, 55.4 Ma

Scientific classification
- Domain: Eukaryota
- Kingdom: Animalia
- Phylum: Chordata
- Class: Aves
- Order: †Halcyornithiformes
- Family: †Halcyornithidae
- Genus: †Pulchrapollia; Dyke & Cooper, 2000

Type species
- †Pulchrapollia gracilis (Dyke & Cooper, 2000)

Extinct genus of birds

Pulchrapollia is an extinct genus of halcyornithid bird from the Early Eocene London Clay of Walton-on-the-Naze, United Kingdom and the Nanjemoy Formation of Virginia, United States. The genus contains three species, Pulchrapollia gracilis, Pulchrapollia tenuipes and Pulchrapollia eximia.

== Discovery and naming ==
The holotype of Pulchrapollia was originally found in 1978 by a collector near Walton-on-the-Naze in Bed A, a Ypresian sediment of the London Clay, a fossil-rich formation. The holotype, BMNH A 6207, consists of a partial skeleton including much of the legs and wings, as well as two vertebrae and miscellaneous indeterminate skeletal fragments. Additional specimens from the London Clay at Walton-on-the-Naze have been collected, including NMS.Z.2021.40.64 in 1985 and NMS.Z.2021.40.65 in 1991, both type specimens for species of Pulchrapollia, by M. Daniels. In 2016, Gerald Mayr tentatively referred several new specimens from the Nanjemoy Formation of Virginia, United States to Pulchrapollia without specific assignment.

In 2000, BMNH A 6207 was described as the type species Pulchrapollia gracilis and assigned to the Psittaciformes by Dyke and Cooper. The generic name is from Latin pulchra, meaning "beautiful", and "Polly", a common English name given to parrots. The specific epithet is from the Latin gracilis, meaning slender. In 2023, Mayr and Kitchener described Pulchrapollia tenuipes based on NMS.Z.2021.40.65. The specific epithet is from the Latin tenuis, meaning slender, and pes, meaning foot, referring to a slender tarsometatarsus. Also described was Pulchrapollia eximia, holotype NMS.Z.2021.40.64. The specific epithet is from the Latin eximius, meaning extraordinary, and refers to the very good preservation of the type fossil.

== Description ==
Pulchrapollia was a small bird, about the size of the red-fronted parakeet. The coracoid is long and slender and has a well-developed procoracoid process. The humerus and ulna are gracile, as is the humerus. Like other halcyornithids, Pulchrapollia had zygodactyl feet, with two toes facing forward and two facing back on each foot. The holotype of Pulchrapollia eximia preserves a neurocranium, which is much smaller than that in other halcyornithids; the neurocranium of Pseudasturides macrocephalus, a similarly-sized bird, is twice as large, and that of Halcyornis toliapicus is also much larger, with correspondingly larger brain. It is possible that this difference represents an increase in encephalisation among halcyornithids over time.

== Classification ==
Pulchrapollia is a member of the Halcyornithidae, a family of Eocene birds known from the early Eocene of Europe and North America. Halcyornithids are regarded as basal relatives of both parrots and songbirds. Pulchrapollia was initially described as a psittaciform stem-parrot, and indeed was regarded as distinct from the Halcyornithidae. The affinities of the halcyornithids are currently not clear, but new data on other fossil birds close to Psittacopasseres such as the Messelasturidae are allowing for clarification of the position of these zygodactyl Eocene birds.
