= 1825 in paleontology =

Paleontology or palaeontology is the study of prehistoric life forms on Earth through the examination of plant and animal fossils. This includes the study of body fossils, tracks (ichnites), burrows, cast-off parts, fossilised feces (coprolites), palynomorphs and chemical residues. Because humans have encountered fossils for millennia, paleontology has a long history both before and after becoming formalized as a science. This article records significant discoveries and events related to paleontology that occurred or were published in the year 1825.

== Dinosaurs ==
=== New taxa ===
Name	Novelty	Status	Author(s)	Age	Unit	Location	Notes	Images
Iguanodon	Gen. nov.	Valid	Mantell	Barremian, 126–125 mya	Wessex Formation	England	In a presentation to the Royal Society of London, Mantell reports his conclusion that the newly named Iguanodon is a new giant herbivorous reptile.	

== Birds ==
=== New taxa ===
Name	Novelty	Status	Author(s)	Age	Unit	Location	Notes	Images
Larus toliapicus	Sp. nov	Valid	Koenig	Early Eocene (Ypresian)	London Clay Formation	England	Described as a genus of Laridae, but transferred to a new genus Halcyornis Owen, 1846.	

== Pterosaurs ==
- Paleontologist Georg Graf Munster discovered an unusual skull. He sent the fossil to Soemmering, who thought it belonged to an ancient sea bird. He also sent a cast of the skull to August Georg Goldfuss, who recognized it as a pterosaur. He would name it in 1831.
