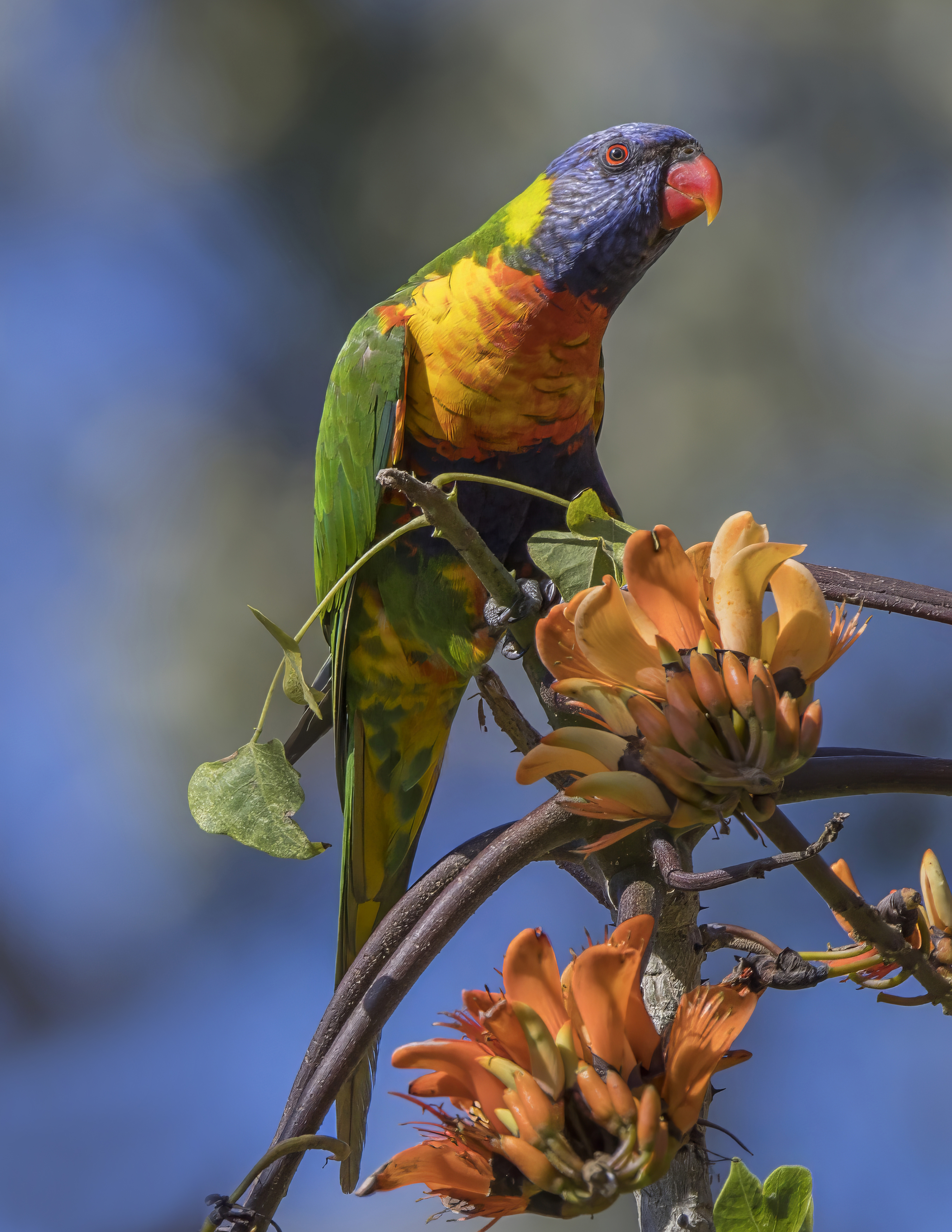
- Rainbow lorikeet (Trichoglossus moluccanus)

Scientific classification
- Kingdom: Animalia
- Phylum: Chordata
- Class: Aves
- Clade: Psittacopasseres
- Order: Psittaciformes; Wagler, 1830

Superfamilies
- Cacatuoidea (cockatoos); Psittacoidea (true parrots); Strigopoidea (New Zealand parrots)
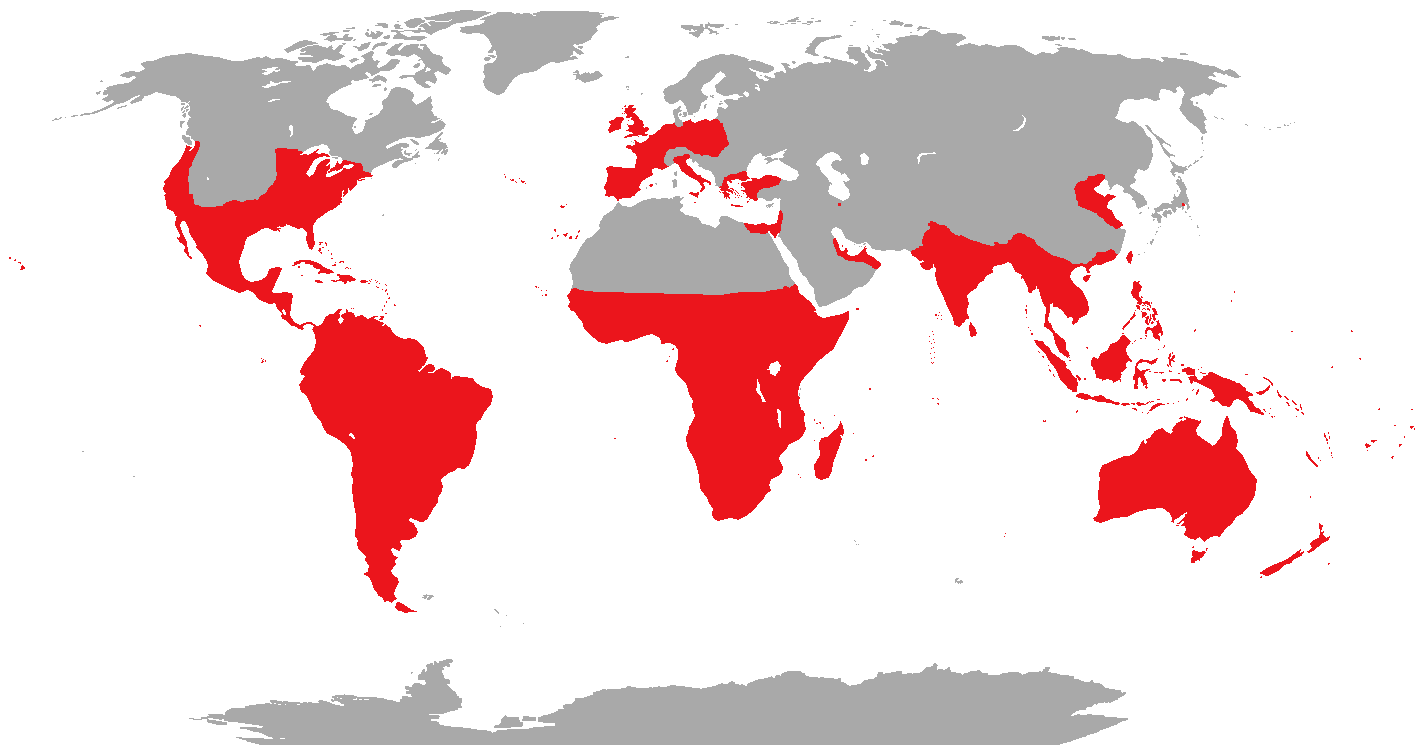
- Range of parrots, all species (red)

= Parrot =

Parrots Temporal range: Eocene–Holocene 50–0 Ma

Order of birds

Parrots (order Psittaciformes), also known as psittacines (/ˈsɪtəsaɪnz/) from the name of the type genus Psittacus, are birds with a strong curved beak, upright stance, and clawed feet. (Note: They are zygodactyl feet: two toes facing forward and two back.) They are classified in four families that contain roughly 410 species in 101 genera, found mostly in tropical and subtropical regions. The four families are the Psittaculidae (Old World parrots), Psittacidae (African and New World parrots), Cacatuidae (cockatoos), and Strigopidae (New Zealand parrots). One-third of all parrot species are threatened by extinction, with a higher aggregate extinction risk (IUCN Red List Index) than any other comparable bird group. Parrots have a generally pantropical distribution with several species inhabiting temperate regions as well. The greatest diversity of parrots is in South America and Australasia.

Parrots, along with corvids (ravens, crows, jays, and magpies), are among the most intelligent birds, and the ability of some species to imitate human speech enhances their popularity as pets. They form the most variably sized bird order in terms of length; many are vividly coloured and some, multi-coloured. Most parrots exhibit little or no sexual dimorphism in the visual spectrum.

The most important components of most parrots' diets are seeds, nuts, fruit, buds, and other plant material. A few species sometimes eat animals and carrion, while the lories and lorikeets are specialised for feeding on floral nectar and soft fruit. Almost all parrots nest in tree hollows (or nest boxes in captivity), and lay white eggs from which hatch altricial (helpless) young.

Trapping wild parrots for the pet trade, as well as hunting, habitat loss, and competition from invasive species, has diminished wild populations, with parrots being subjected to more exploitation than any other group of wild birds. As of 2021, about 50 million parrots (half of all parrots) live in captivity, with the vast majority of these living as pets in people's homes. Measures taken to conserve the habitats of some high-profile charismatic species have also protected many of the less charismatic species living in the same ecosystems.

Parrots are the only creatures that display true tripedalism, using their necks and beaks as limbs with propulsive forces equal to or greater than those forces generated by the forelimbs of primates when climbing vertical surfaces. They can travel with cyclical tripedal gaits when climbing.

== Taxonomy ==
=== Origins and evolution ===
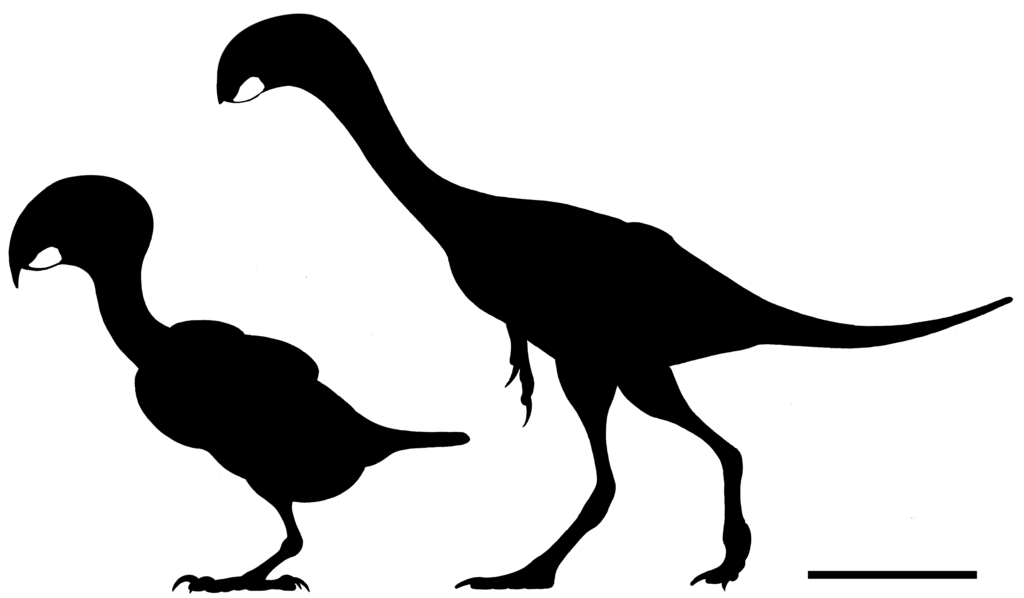
Fossil dentary specimen UCMP 143274 restored as a parrot (left) or an oviraptorosaur

Psittaciform diversity in South America and Australasia suggests that the order may have evolved in Gondwana, centred in Australasia. The scarcity of parrots in the fossil record, however, presents difficulties in confirming the hypothesis. There is currently a higher number of fossil remains from the northern hemisphere in the early Cenozoic. Molecular studies suggest that parrots evolved approximately 59 million years ago (Mya) (range 66–51 Mya) in Gondwana. The Neotropical parrots are monophyletic, and the three major clades originated about 50 Mya (range 57–41 Mya).

A single 15 mm (0.6 in) fragment from a large lower bill (UCMP 143274), found in deposits from the Lance Creek Formation in Niobrara County, Wyoming, had been thought to be the oldest parrot fossil and is presumed to have originated from the Late Cretaceous period, which makes it about 70 million years old. However, other studies suggest that this fossil is not from a bird, but from a caenagnathid oviraptorosaur (a non-avian dinosaur with a birdlike beak), as several details of the fossil used to support its identity as a parrot are not actually exclusive to parrots, and it is dissimilar to the earliest-known unequivocal parrot fossils.

It is generally assumed that the Psittaciformes were present during the Cretaceous–Paleogene extinction event (K-Pg extinction), 66 mya. They were probably generalised arboreal birds, and did not have the specialised crushing bills of modern species. Genomic analysis provides strong evidence that parrots are the sister group of passerines, forming the clade Psittacopasserae, which is in turn the sister group of the falcons.

The first uncontroversial parrot fossils date to tropical Eocene Europe around 50 mya. Initially, a neoavian named Mopsitta tanta, uncovered in Denmark's Early Eocene Fur Formation and dated to 54 mya, was assigned to the Psittaciformes. However, the rather nondescript bone is not unequivocally psittaciform, and it may rather belong to the ibis genus Rhynchaeites, whose fossil legs were found in the same deposits.

Several fairly complete skeletons of parrot-like birds have been found in England and Germany. These are probably not transitional fossils between ancestral and modern parrots, but rather lineages that evolved parallel to true parrots and cockatoos:

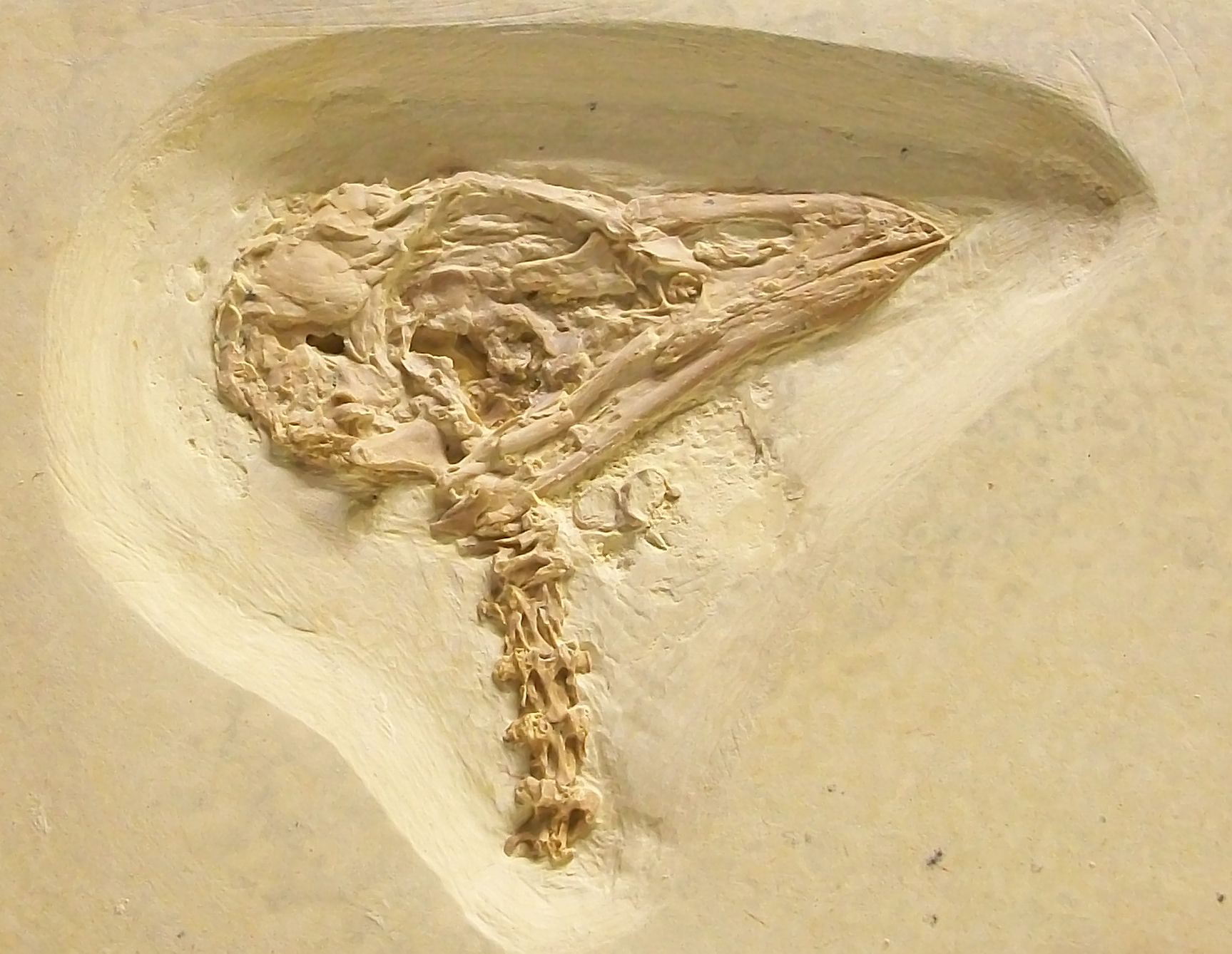
Cyrilavis colburnorum, from the Eocene Green River Formation in Wyoming

- Psittacopes
- Serudaptus
- Halcyornithidae
  - Cyrilavis
  - Halcyornis
  - Pulchrapollia
  - Pseudasturides
- Vastanavidae
  - Vastanavis
- Quercypsittidae
  - Quercypsitta
- Messelasturidae
  - Messelastur
  - Tynskya

The earliest records of modern parrots date to around 23–20 mya. The fossil record—mainly from Europe—consists of bones clearly recognisable as belonging to anatomically modern parrots. The Southern Hemisphere contains no known parrot-like remains earlier than the Early Miocene around 20 mya.

=== Etymology ===
The name 'Psittaciformes' comes from the ancient Greek for parrot, ψιττακός ('Psittacus'), whose origin is unclear. Ctesias (5th century BCE) recorded the name Psittacus after the Indian name for a bird, most likely a parakeet (now placed in the genus Psittacula). Pliny the Elder (23/24–79 CE) in his Natural History (book 10, chapter 58) noted that the Indians called the bird "siptaces"; however, no matching Indian name has been traced. "Popinjay" is an older term for parrots, first used in English in the 1500s.

=== Phylogeny ===
Molecular phylogenetic studies have shown that Psittaciformes form a monophyletic clade that is sister to the Passeriformes: The time calibrated phylogeny indicates that the Australaves diverged around 65 Ma (million years ago) and the Psittaciformes diverged from the Passeriformes around 62 Ma.

- Australaves
  - Cariamiformes – seriemas
  - - Falconiformes – falcons
    - - Psittaciformes – parrots
      - Passeriformes – songbirds

Most taxonomists now divide Psittaciformes into four families; Strigopidae (New Zealand parrots), Cacatuidae (Cockatoos), Psittacidae (African and New World parrots) and Psittaculidae (Old World parrots). In 2012, Leo Joseph and collaborators proposed that the parrots should be divided into six families. The New Zealand parrots in the genus Nestor were placed in a separate family Nestoridae and the two basal genera in the family Psittaculidae (Psittrichas and Coracopsis) were placed in a separate family Psittrichasidae. The two additional families have not been recognised by taxonomists involved in curating lists of world birds and instead only four families are recognised.

The following cladogram shows the phylogenetic relationships between the four families. The species numbers are taken from the list maintained by Frank Gill, Pamela Rasmussen and David Donsker on behalf of the International Ornithological Committee (IOC), now the International Ornithologists' Union.

- Psittaciformes
  - Strigopidae – New Zealand parrots (4 species)
  - - Cacatuidae – Cockatoos (22 species)
    - - Psittacidae – African and New World parrots (179 species)
      - Psittaculidae – Old World parrots (203 species)

The Psittaciformes comprise three main lineages; Strigopoidea, Cacatuoidea, and Psittacoidea. The Strigopoidea were considered part of the Psittacoidea, but are now placed at the base of the parrot tree next to the remaining members of the Psittacoidea, as well as all members of the Cacatuoidea. The Cacatuoidea are distinct from the rest of the order in having a movable head crest, a different arrangement of the carotid arteries, a gall bladder, differences in the skull bones, and in lacking the Dyck texture feathers that, in the Psittacidae, scatter light to produce the vibrant colours of many parrots. Colourful feathers with high levels of psittacofulvin resist the feather-degrading bacterium Bacillus licheniformis better than white ones. Lorikeets were previously regarded as a third family, Loriidae, but are now considered a tribe (Loriini) within the subfamily Loriinae in the family Psittaculidae. The two other tribes in the subfamily are the closely related fig parrots (two genera in the tribe Cyclopsittini) and budgerigar (tribe Melopsittacini).

- Psittaciformes
  - - Strigopoidea
      Strigopidae
  - - Cacatuoidea
      Cacatuidae
    - Psittacoidea
      - Psittacidae
        - Neotropical parrots
        - Psittacinae
      - Psittaculidae
        - Psittrichasinae
          - Psittrichas
          - Coracopsis
        - - Psittaculinae
          - - Broad-tailed parrots
            - - - Fig parrots
                - - Budgerigar
                  - Lories and Lorikeets
              - - Bolbopsittacus
                - - Hanging parrots
                  - Lovebirds
            - Psittacella

Phylogenetic relations between parrots

=== Systematics ===
The order Psittaciformes consists of four families containing roughly 410 species belonging to 101 genera.

Superfamily Strigopoidea: New Zealand parrots

- Family Strigopidae
  - Subfamily Nestorinae: two genera with two living (kea and New Zealand kākā) and several extinct species of the New Zealand region
  - Subfamily Strigopinae: the flightless, critically endangered kākāpō of New Zealand

Superfamily Cacatuoidea: cockatoos

- Family Cacatuidae
  - Subfamily Nymphicinae: one genus with one species, the cockatiel.
  - Subfamily Calyptorhynchinae: the black cockatoos
  - Subfamily Cacatuinae
    - Tribe Microglossini: one genus with one species, the black palm cockatoo
    - Tribe Cacatuini: four genera of white, pink, and grey species

Superfamily Psittacoidea: true parrots

- Family Psittacidae
  - Subfamily Psittacinae: two African genera, Psittacus and Poicephalus
  - Subfamily Arinae
    - Tribe Arini: 18 genera
    - Tribe Androglossini: seven genera.
- Family Psittaculidae
  - Subfamily Psittrichasinae: two genera, Psittrichas (Pesquet's parrot), Coracopsis
  - Subfamily Platycercinae
    - Tribe Pezoporini: ground parrots and allies
    - Tribe Platycercini: broad-tailed parrots
  - Subfamily Psittacellinae: one genus (Psittacella) with several species
  - Subfamily Loriinae
    - Tribe Loriini: lories and lorikeets
    - Tribe Melopsittacini: one genus with one species, the budgerigar
    - Tribe Cyclopsittini: fig parrots
  - Subfamily Agapornithinae: three genera
  - Subfamily Psittaculinae
    - Tribe Polytelini: three genera
    - Tribe Psittaculini: Asian psittacines
    - Tribe Micropsittini: pygmy parrots

== Morphology ==
Skeletons

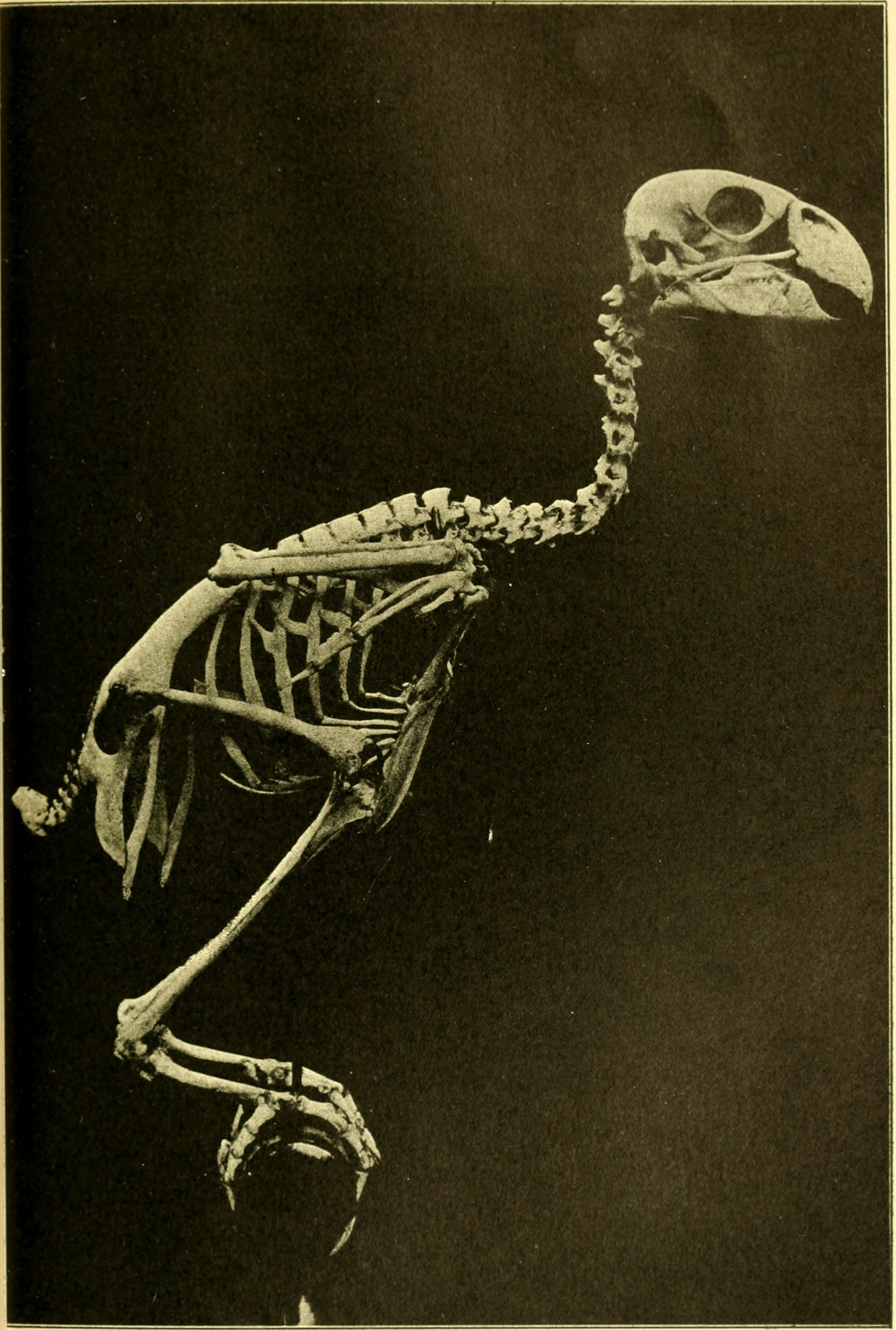
Kākāpō (critically endangered)

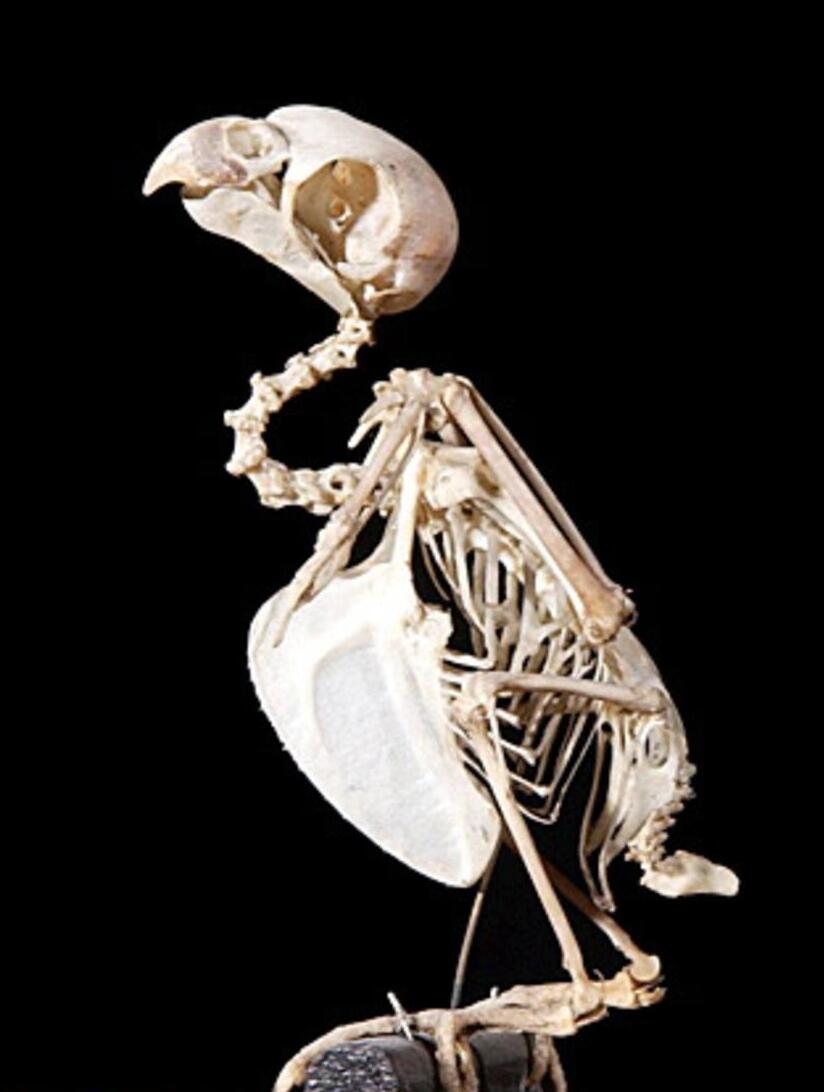
Paradise parrot (extinct)

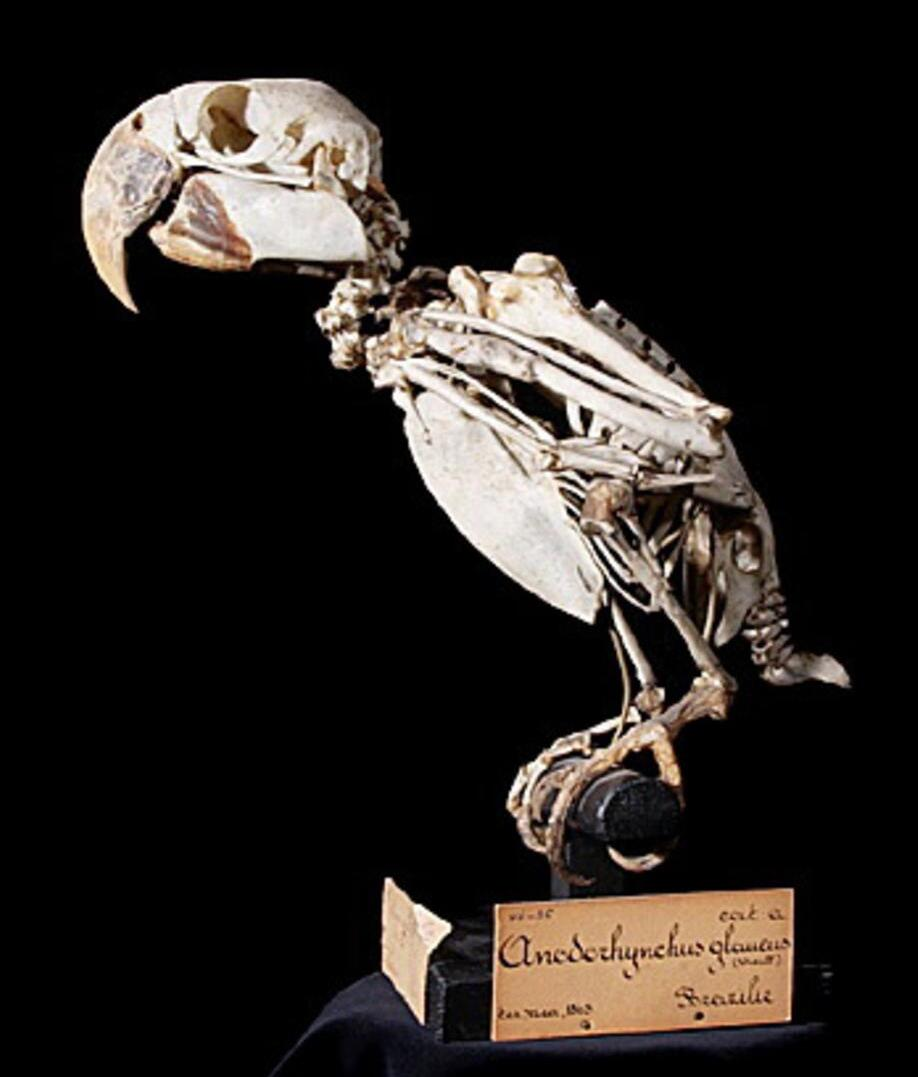
Glaucous macaw (extinct)

Living species range in size from the buff-faced pygmy parrot, at under 10 g (0.4 oz) in weight and 8 cm (3.1 in) in length, to the hyacinth macaw, at 1 m (3.3 ft) in length, and the kākāpō, at 4.0 kg (8.8 lb) in weight. Among the superfamilies, the three extant Strigopoidea species are all large parrots, and the cockatoos tend to be large birds, as well. The Psittacoidea parrots are far more variable, ranging the full spectrum of sizes shown by the family.

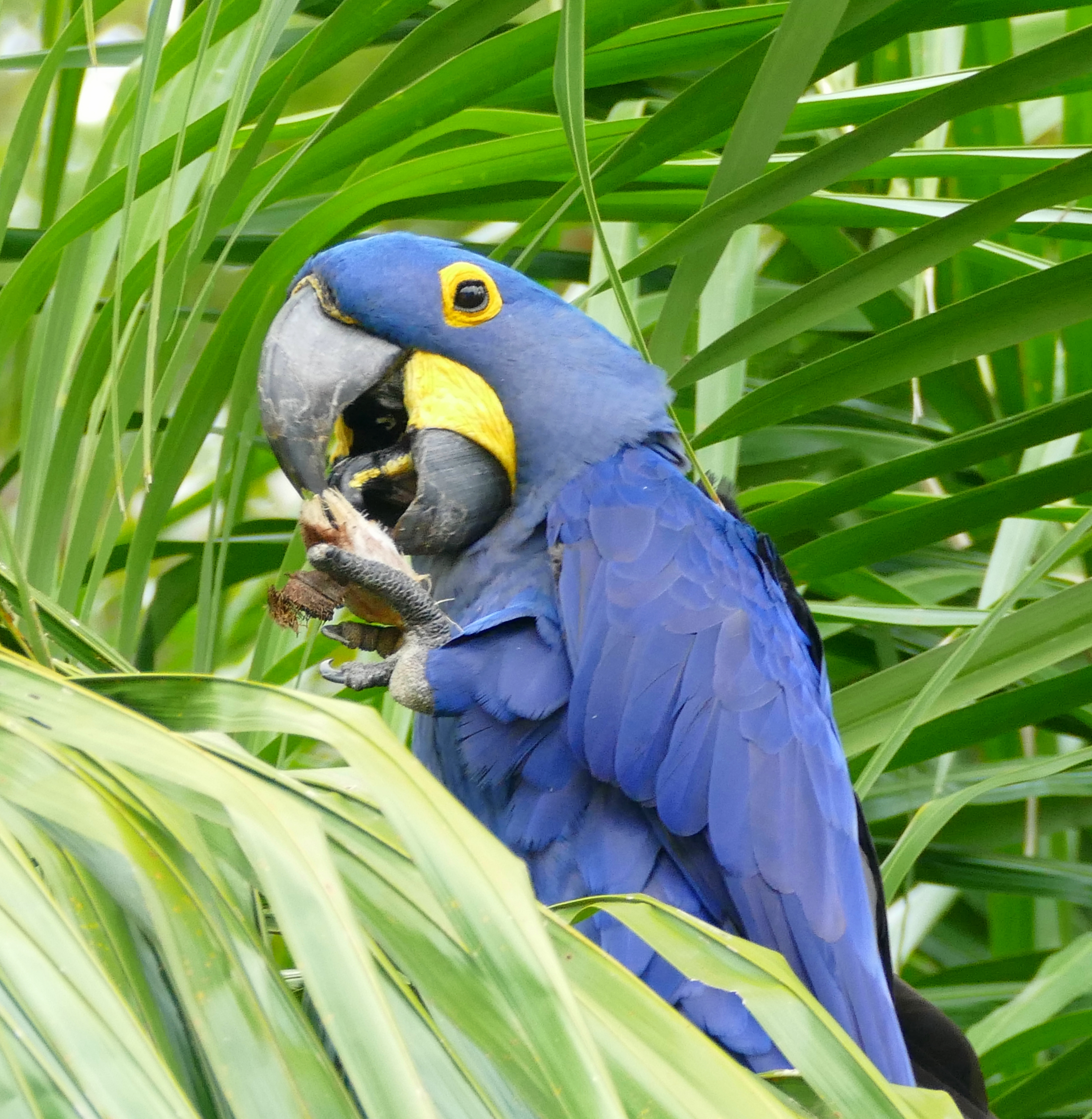
Hyacinth macaw cracking a palm nut

The most obvious physical characteristic is the strong, curved, broad bill. The upper mandible is prominent, curves downward, and comes to a point. It is not fused to the skull, which allows it to move independently, and contributes to the tremendous biting pressure the birds are able to exert. A large macaw, for example, has a bite force of 35 kg/cm^{2} (500 lb/sq in), close to that of a large dog. The lower mandible is shorter, with a sharp, upward-facing cutting edge, which moves against the flat part of the upper mandible in an anvil-like fashion. Touch receptors occur along the inner edges of the keratinised bill, which are collectively known as the "bill tip organ", allowing for highly dexterous manipulations. Seed-eating parrots have a strong tongue (containing similar touch receptors to those in the bill tip organ), which helps to manipulate seeds or position nuts in the bill so that the mandibles can apply an appropriate cracking force. The head is large, with eyes positioned high and laterally in the skull, so the visual field of parrots is unlike any other birds. Without turning its head, a parrot can see from just below its bill tip, all above its head, and quite far behind its head. Parrots also have quite a wide frontal binocular field for a bird, although this is nowhere near as large as primate binocular visual fields. Unlike humans, the vision of parrots is also sensitive to ultraviolet light.

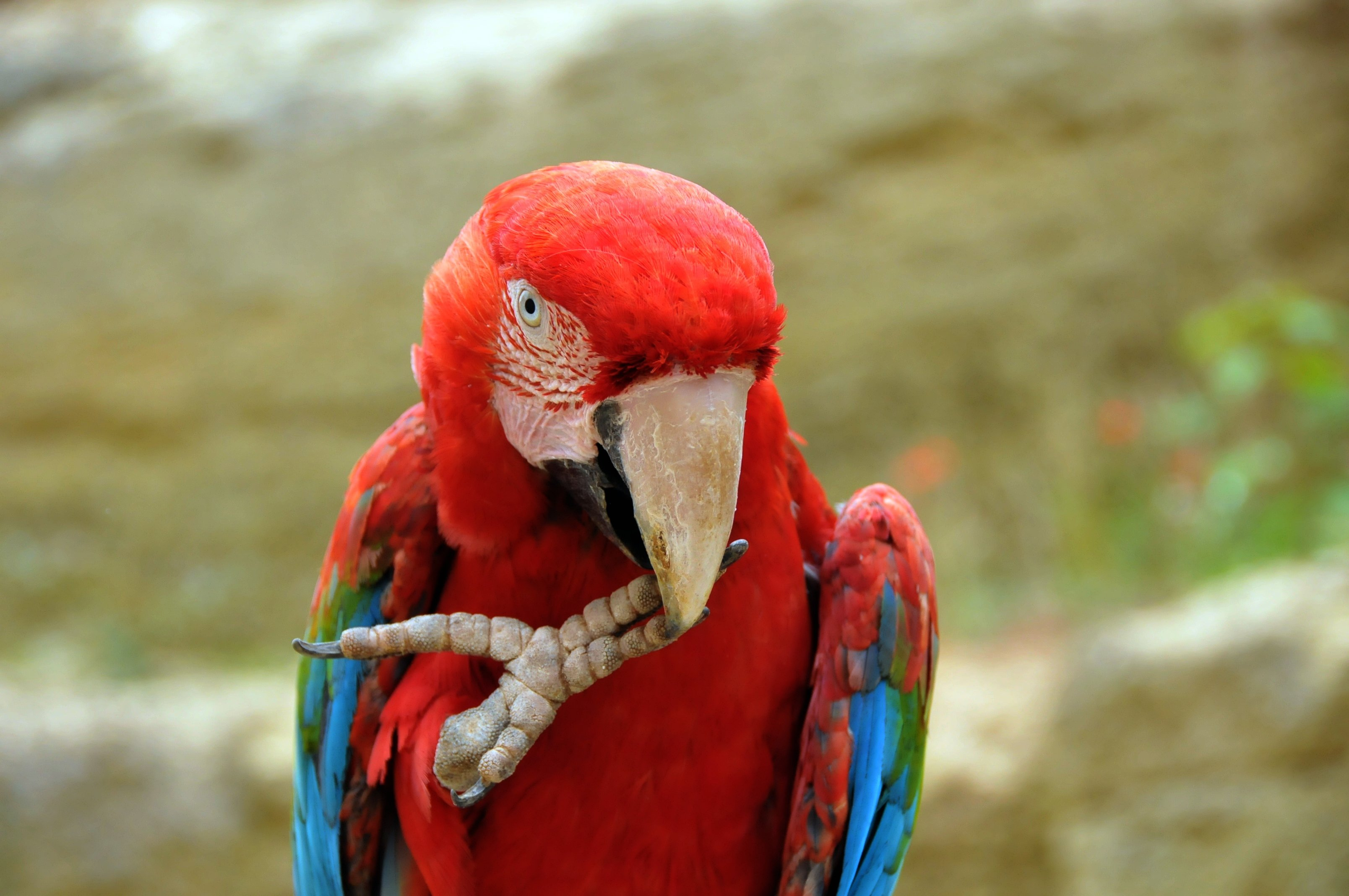
Scarlet macaw displaying its zygodactyl feet.

Parrots have strong zygodactyl feet (two toes facing forward and two back) with sharp, elongated claws, which are used for climbing and swinging. Most species are capable of using their feet to manipulate food and other objects with a high degree of dexterity, in a similar manner to a human using their hands. A study conducted with Australian parrots has demonstrated that they exhibit "handedness", a distinct preference with regards to the foot used to pick up food, with adult parrots being almost exclusively "left-footed" or "right-footed", and with the prevalence of each preference within the population varying by species.

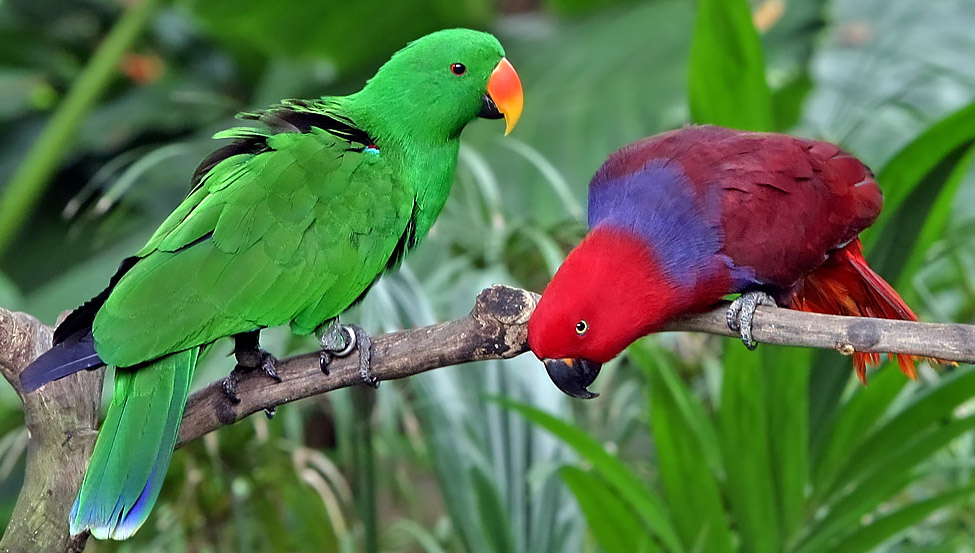
Eclectus parrots, male left and female right

Cockatoo species have a mobile crest of feathers on the top of their heads, which they can raise for display, and retract. No other parrots can do so, but the Pacific lorikeets in the genera Vini and Phigys can ruffle the feathers of the crown and nape, and the red-fan parrot (or hawk-headed parrot) has a prominent feather neck frill that it can raise and lower at will. The predominant colour of plumage in parrots is green, though most species have some red or another colour in small quantities. Cockatoos, however, are predominately black or white with some red, pink, or yellow.

Strong sexual dimorphism in plumage is not typical among parrots, with some notable exceptions, the most striking being the eclectus parrot. However, it has been shown that some parrot species exhibit sexually dimorphic plumage in the ultraviolet spectrum, normally invisible to humans.

== Distribution and habitat ==
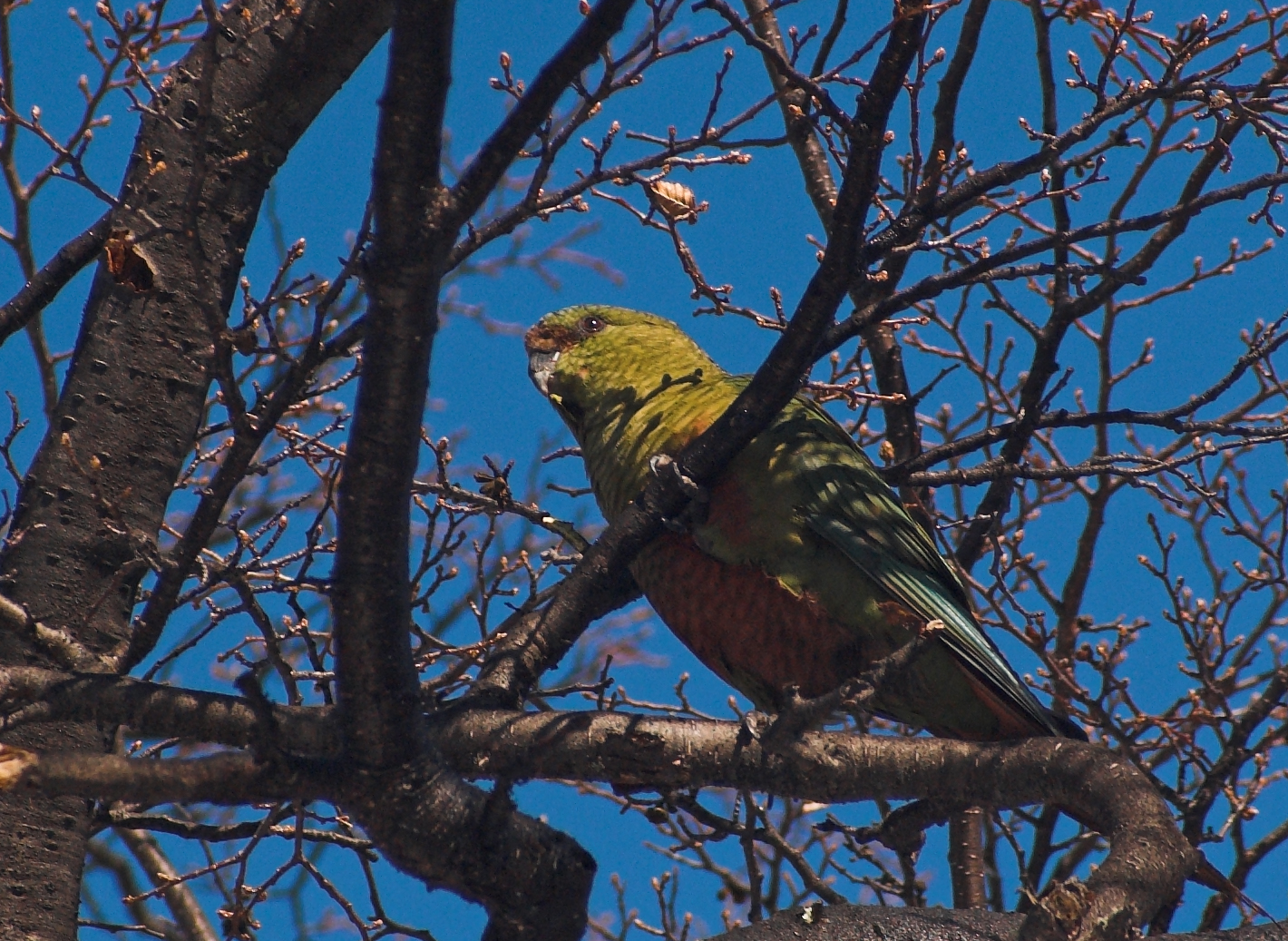
Most parrot species are tropical, but a few species, like this austral parakeet, range deeply into temperate zones.

Parrots are found on all tropical and subtropical continents and regions including Australia and Oceania, South Asia, Southeast Asia, Central America, South America, and Africa. Some Caribbean and Pacific islands are home to endemic species. By far the greatest number of parrot species come from Australasia and South America. The lories and lorikeets range from Sulawesi and the Philippines in the north to Australia and across the Pacific as far as French Polynesia, with the greatest diversity being found in and around New Guinea. The subfamily Arinae encompasses all the neotropical parrots, including the amazons, macaws, and conures, and ranges from northern Mexico and the Bahamas to Tierra del Fuego in the southern tip of South America. The pygmy parrots, tribe Micropsittini, form a small genus restricted to New Guinea and the Solomon Islands. The superfamily Strigopoidea contains three living species of aberrant parrots from New Zealand. The broad-tailed parrots, subfamily Platycercinae, are restricted to Australia, New Zealand, and the Pacific islands as far eastwards as Fiji. The true parrot superfamily, Psittacoidea, includes a range of species from Australia and New Guinea to South Asia and Africa. The centre of cockatoo biodiversity is Australia and New Guinea, although some species reach the Solomon Islands (and one formerly occurred in New Caledonia), Wallacea and the Philippines.

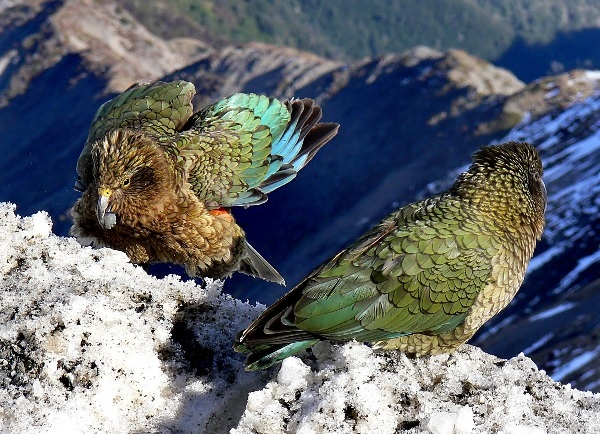
The kea is the only alpine parrot.

Several parrots inhabit the cool, temperate regions of South America and New Zealand. Three species—the thick-billed parrot, the green parakeet, and the now-extinct Carolina parakeet—have lived as far north as the southern United States. Many parrots, especially monk parakeets, have been introduced to areas with temperate climates, and have established stable populations in parts of the United States (including New York City), the United Kingdom, Belgium, Spain, and Greece. These birds can be quite successful in introduced areas, such as the non-native population of red-crowned amazons in the U.S. which may rival that of their native Mexico. The only parrot to inhabit alpine climates is the kea, which is endemic to the Southern Alps mountain range on New Zealand's South Island.

Few parrots are wholly sedentary or fully migratory. Most fall somewhere between the two extremes, making poorly understood regional movements, with some adopting an entirely nomadic lifestyle. Only three species, all Australian, are migratory – the orange-bellied, blue-winged and swift parrots.

== Behaviour ==
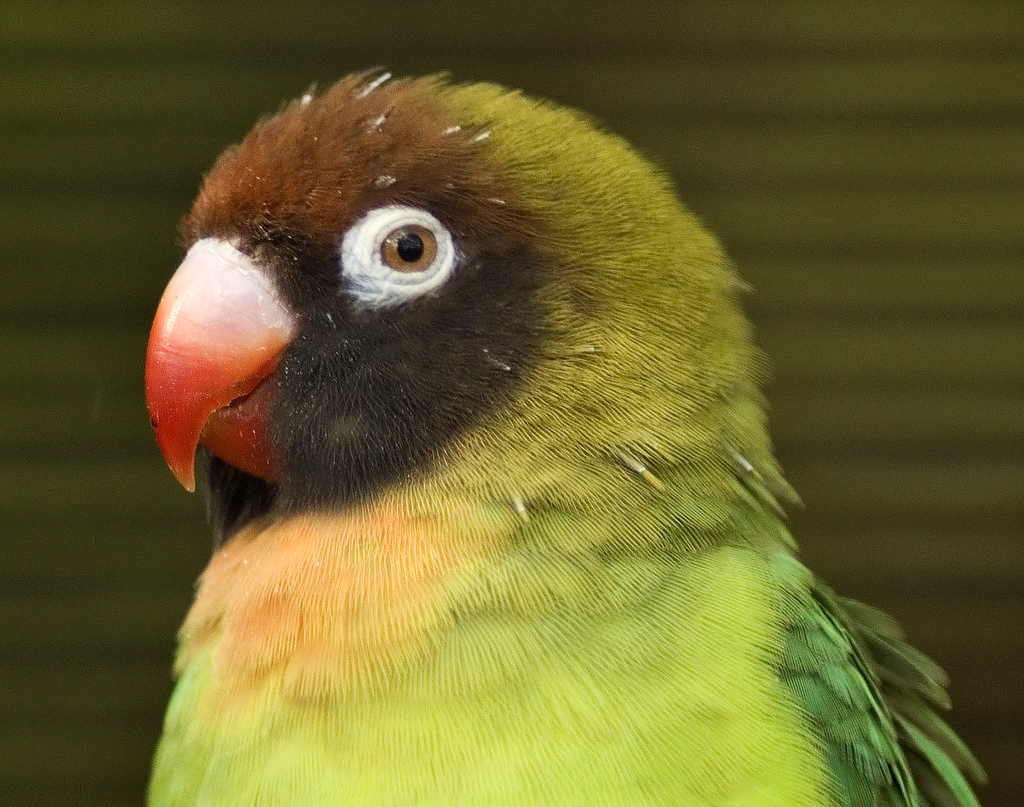
Black-cheeked lovebird with pin feathers

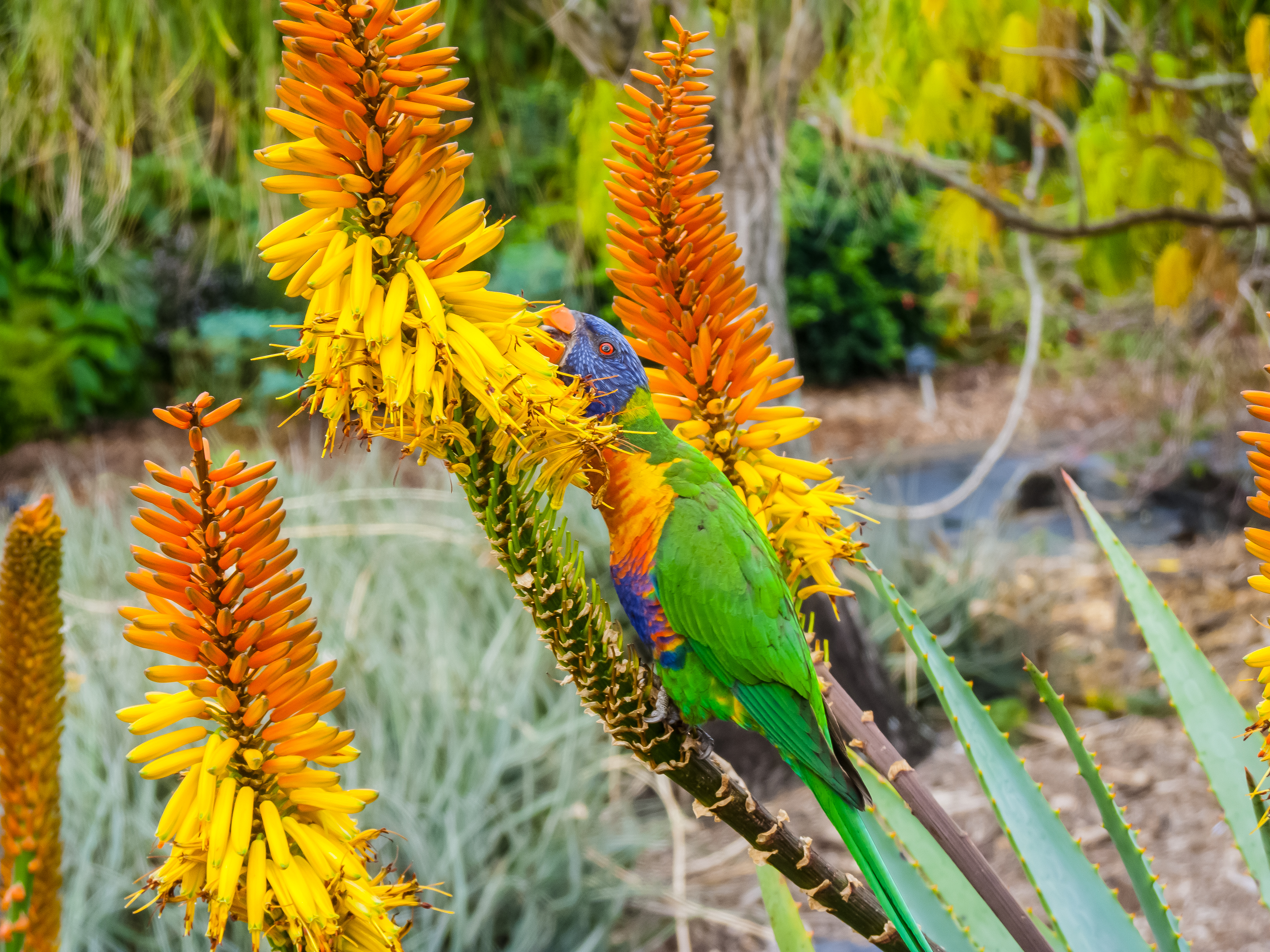
Rainbow lorikeet feeding on Aloe nectar

Numerous challenges are found in studying wild parrots, as they are difficult to catch and once caught, they are difficult to mark. Most wild bird studies rely on banding or wing tagging, but parrots chew off such attachments. Parrots also tend to range widely, and consequently many gaps occur in knowledge of their behaviour. Some parrots have a strong, direct flight. Most species spend much of their time perched or climbing in tree canopies.

They often use their bills for climbing by gripping or hooking on branches and other supports. Researchers at the New York Institute of Technology published findings that showed parrots used their beaks as a "third limb" to navigate branches. The term beakiation has been coined for this, similar to brachiation in mammals. However, it is unknown whether this behaviour is exhibited by parrots in the wild, although similar behavior has been reported from the Puerto Rican spindalis. On the ground, parrots often walk with a rolling gait.

=== Diet ===
A yellow-tailed black cockatoo using its strong bill to search for grubs

The diet of parrots includes of seeds, fruit, nectar, pollen, buds, and sometimes arthropods and other animal prey. The most important of these for most true parrots and cockatoos are seeds; their large and powerful bill are evolved to open and consume tough seeds. All true parrots, except the Pesquet's parrot, employ the same method to obtain the seed from the husk; the seed is held between the mandibles and the lower mandible crushes the husk, whereupon the seed is rotated in the bill and the remaining husk is removed. They may use their foot sometimes to hold large seeds in place. Parrots are granivores rather than seed dispersers, and in many cases where they are seen consuming fruit, they are only eating the fruit to get at the seed. As seeds often have poisons that protect them, parrots carefully remove seed coats and other chemically defended fruit parts prior to ingestion. Many species in the Americas, Africa, and Papua New Guinea consume clay, which releases minerals and absorbs toxic compounds from the gut.

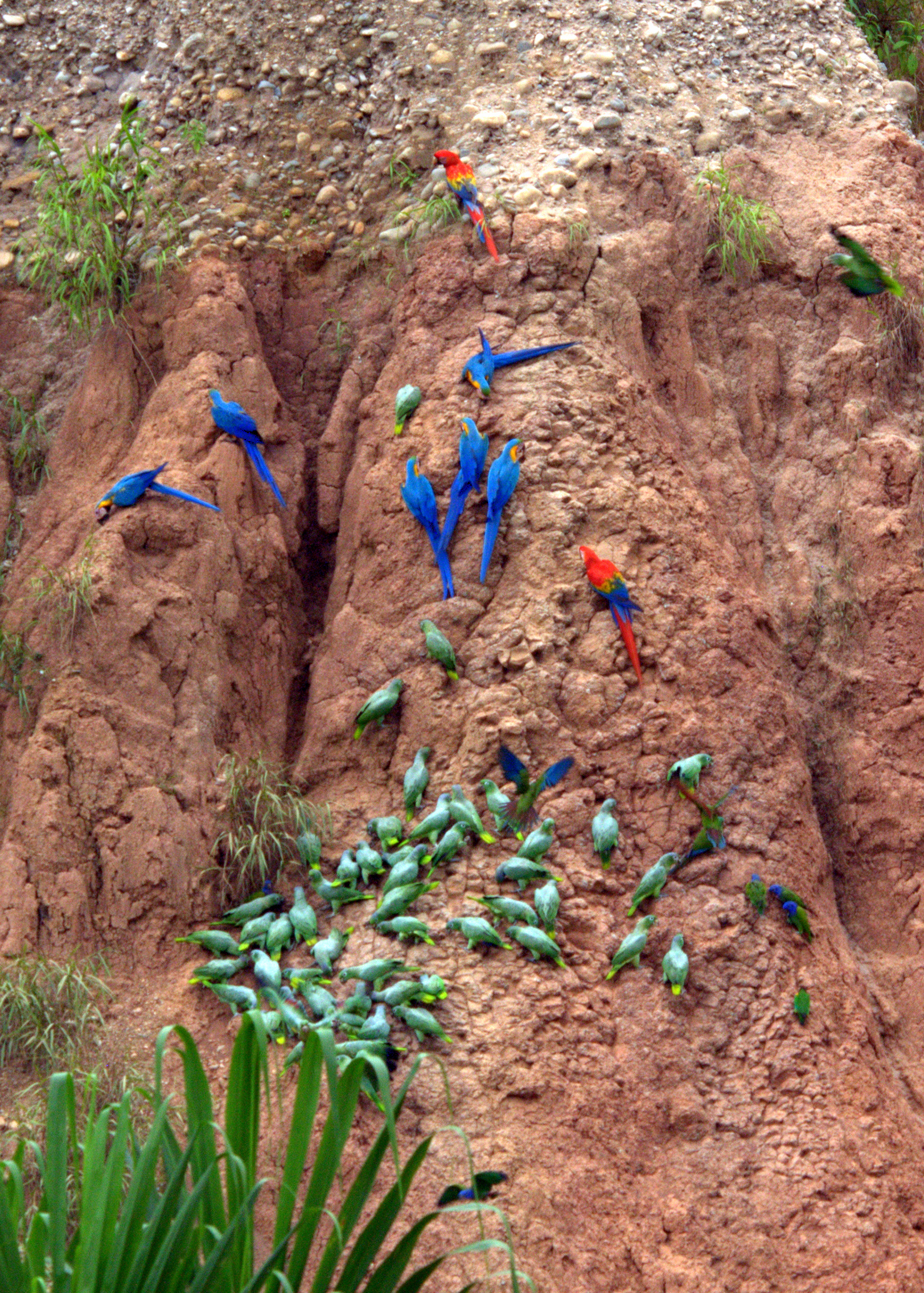
Blue-and-yellow macaws, scarlet macaws, chestnut-fronted macaws, mealy amazons, blue-headed parrots and an orange-cheeked parrot at a clay lick at Tambopata National Reserve, Peru.

Geographical range and body size predominantly explains the diet composition of Neotropical parrots rather than phylogeny.

Lories, lorikeets, hanging parrots, and swift parrots are primarily nectar and pollen consumers, and have tongues with brush tips to collect it, as well as some specialised gut adaptations. Many other species also consume nectar when it becomes available.

Some parrot species prey on animals, especially invertebrate larvae. Golden-winged parakeets prey on water snails, the New Zealand kea can, though uncommonly, hunt adult sheep, and the Antipodes parakeet, another New Zealand parrot, enters the burrows of nesting grey-backed storm petrels and kills the incubating adults. Some cockatoos and the New Zealand kākā excavate branches and wood to feed on grubs; the bulk of the yellow-tailed black cockatoo's diet is made up of insects.

Some extinct parrot-like birds had carnivorous diets. Pseudasturids were probably cuckoo- or puffbird-like insectivores, while messelasturids were raptor-like carnivores.

=== Breeding ===
With few exceptions, parrots are monogamous breeders who nest in cavities and hold no territories other than their nesting sites. The pair bonds of the parrots and cockatoos are strong and a pair remains close during the nonbreeding season, even if they join larger flocks. As with many birds, pair bond formation is preceded by courtship displays; these are relatively simple in the case of cockatoos. In Psittacidae parrots' common breeding displays, usually undertaken by the male, include slow, deliberate steps known as a "parade" or "stately walk" and the "eye-blaze", where the pupil of the eye constricts to reveal the edge of the iris. Allopreening is used by the pair to help maintain the bond. Cooperative breeding, where birds other than the breeding pair help raise the young and is common in some bird families, is extremely rare in parrots, and has only unambiguously been demonstrated in the El Oro parakeet and the golden parakeet (which may also exhibit polygamous, or group breeding, behaviour with multiple females contributing to the clutch).

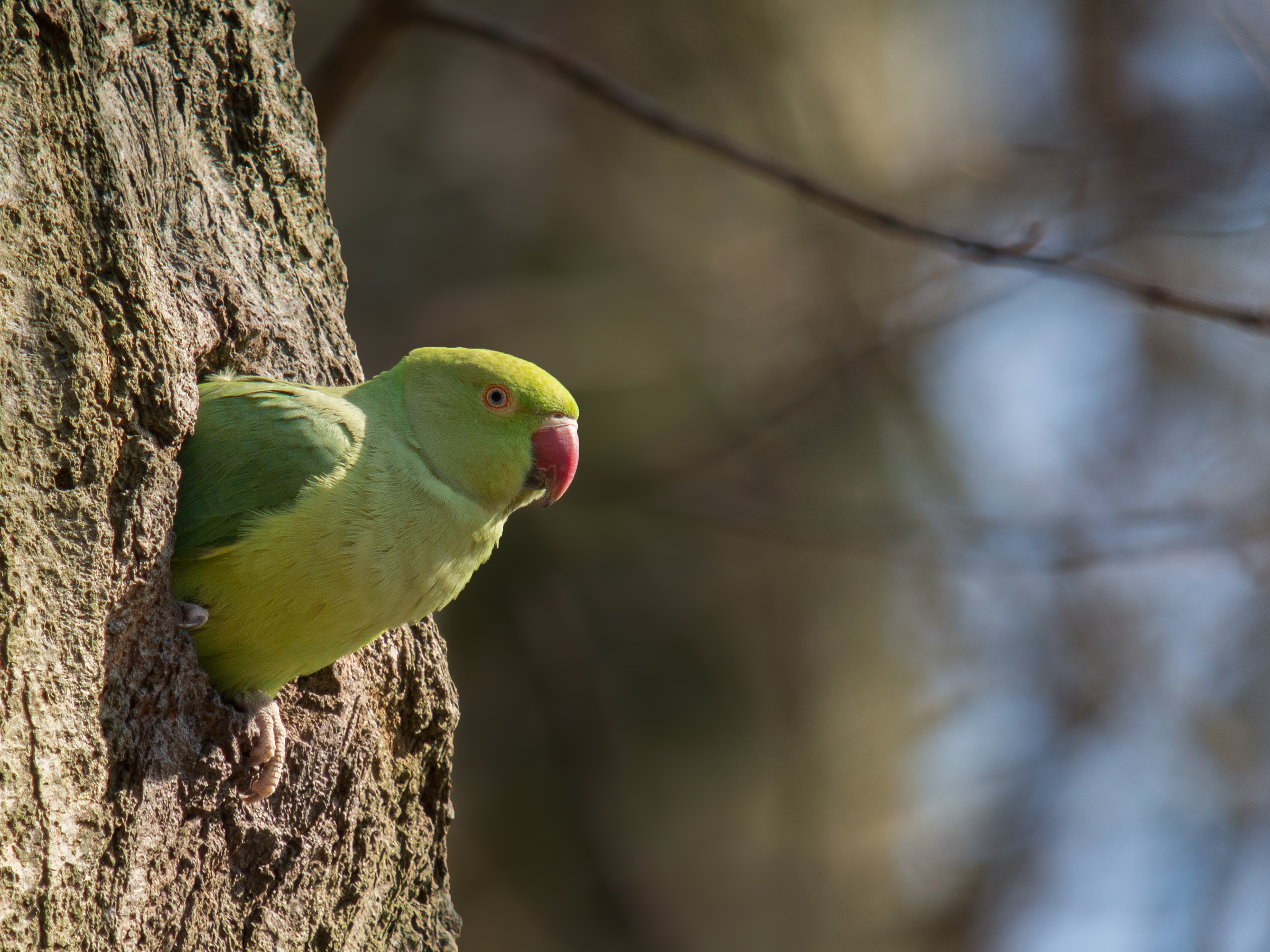
The vast majority of parrots are, like this rose-ringed parakeet, cavity nesters.

Only the monk parakeet and five species of lovebirds build nests in trees, and three Australian and New Zealand ground parrots nest on the ground. All other parrots and cockatoos nest in cavities, either tree hollows or cavities dug into cliffs, banks, or the ground. The use of holes in cliffs is more common in the Americas. Many species use termite nests, possibly to reduce the conspicuousness of the nesting site or to create a favourable microclimate. In most cases, both parents participate in nest excavation. The length of the burrow varies with species, but is usually between 0.5 and 2 m (1.6 and 6.6 ft) in length. The nests of cockatoos are often lined with sticks, wood chips, and other plant material. In the larger species of parrots and cockatoos, the availability of nesting hollows may be limited, leading to intense competition for them both within the species and between species, as well as with other bird families. The intensity of this competition can limit breeding success in some cases. Hollows created artificially by arborists have proven successful in boosting breeding rates in these areas. Some species are colonial, with the burrowing parrot nesting in colonies up to 70,000 strong. Coloniality is not as common in parrots as might be expected, possibly because most species adopt old cavities rather than excavate their own.

The eggs of parrots are white. In most species, the female undertakes all the incubation, although incubation is shared in cockatoos, the blue lorikeet, and the vernal hanging parrot. The female remains in the nest for almost all of the incubation period and is fed both by the male and during short breaks. Incubation varies from 17 to 35 days, with larger species having longer incubation periods. The newly born young are altricial, either lacking feathers or with sparse white down. The young spend three weeks to four months in the nest, depending on species, and may receive parental care for several months thereafter.

As typical of K-selected species, the macaws and other larger parrot species have low reproductive rates. They require several years to reach maturity, produce one or very few young per year, and do not necessarily breed every year.

=== Intelligence and learning ===
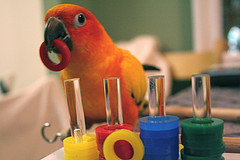
Sun conure demonstrating parrots' puzzle-solving skills

Some grey parrots have shown an ability to associate words with their meanings and form simple sentences. Along with crows, ravens, and jays (family Corvidae), parrots are considered the most intelligent of birds. The brain-to-body size ratio of psittacines and corvines is comparable to that of higher primates. Instead of using the cerebral cortex like mammals, birds use the mediorostral HVC for cognition. Not only have parrots demonstrated intelligence through scientific testing of their language-using ability, but also some species of parrots, such as the kea, are also highly skilled at using tools and solving puzzles.

Learning in early life is apparently important to all parrots, and much of that learning is social learning. Social interactions are often practised with siblings, and in several species, crèches are formed with several broods. Foraging behaviour is generally learnt from parents, and can be a very protracted affair. Generalists and specialists generally become independent of their parents much quicker than partly specialised species who may have to learn skills over long periods as various resources become seasonally available. Play forms a large part of learning in parrots; play can be solitary or social. Species may engage in play fights or wild flights to practice predator evasion. An absence of stimuli can delay the development of young birds, as demonstrated by a group of vasa parrots kept in tiny cages with domesticated chickens from the age of three months; at nine months, these birds still behaved in the same way as three-month-olds, but had adopted some chicken behaviour. In a similar fashion, captive birds in zoo collections or pets can, if deprived of stimuli, develop stereotyped and harmful behaviours like self-plucking. Aviculturists working with parrots have identified the need for environmental enrichment to keep parrots stimulated.

==== Sound imitation and speech ====
Video of an orange-winged amazon saying "hello" having been prompted by some humans

Many parrots can imitate human speech or other sounds. A study by scientist Irene Pepperberg suggested a high learning ability in a grey parrot named Alex. Alex was trained to use words to identify objects, describe them, count them, and even answer complex questions such as "How many red squares?" with over 80% accuracy. N'kisi, another grey parrot, has been shown to have a vocabulary of around a thousand words, and has displayed an ability to invent and use words in context in correct tenses.

Parrots do not have vocal cords, so sound is accomplished by expelling air across the mouth of the trachea in the organ called the syrinx. Different sounds are produced by changing the depth and shape of the trachea. Grey parrots are known for their superior ability to imitate sounds and human speech, which has made them popular pets since ancient times.

Although most parrot species are able to imitate, some of the amazon parrots are generally regarded as the next-best imitators and speakers of the parrot world. The question of why birds imitate remains open, but those that do often score very high on tests designed to measure problem-solving ability. Wild grey parrots have been observed imitating other birds.

Besides imitation, it is possible that parrots could be trained to use simple communication tools, e.g., to request food or a favourite activity by pushing a button.

==== Song ====
Parrots are unusual among birds due to their learned vocal repertoire, a trait they share with only hummingbirds and songbirds. The syrinx (vocal organ) of parrots, which aids in their ability to produce song, is located at the base of the trachea and consists of two complex syringeal muscles that allow for the production of sound vibrations, and a pair of lateral tympaniform membranes that control sound frequency. The position of the syrinx in birds allows for directed air flow into the interclavicular air sacs according to air sac pressure, which in turn creates a higher and louder tone in birds' singing.

==== Cooperation ====
A 2011 study stated that some African grey parrots preferred to work alone, while others like to work together. With two parrots, they know the order of tasks or when they should do something together at once, but they have trouble exchanging roles. With three parrots, one parrot usually prefers to cooperate with one of the other two, but all of them are cooperating to solve the task.

=== Longevity ===
The heightened longevity of parrots appears to involve increased expression of several genomic features including genes employed in cell division, cell cycle regulation, RNA binding/processing, repair of DNA damage and oxidative stress response pathways.

== Relationship with humans ==
=== Pets ===
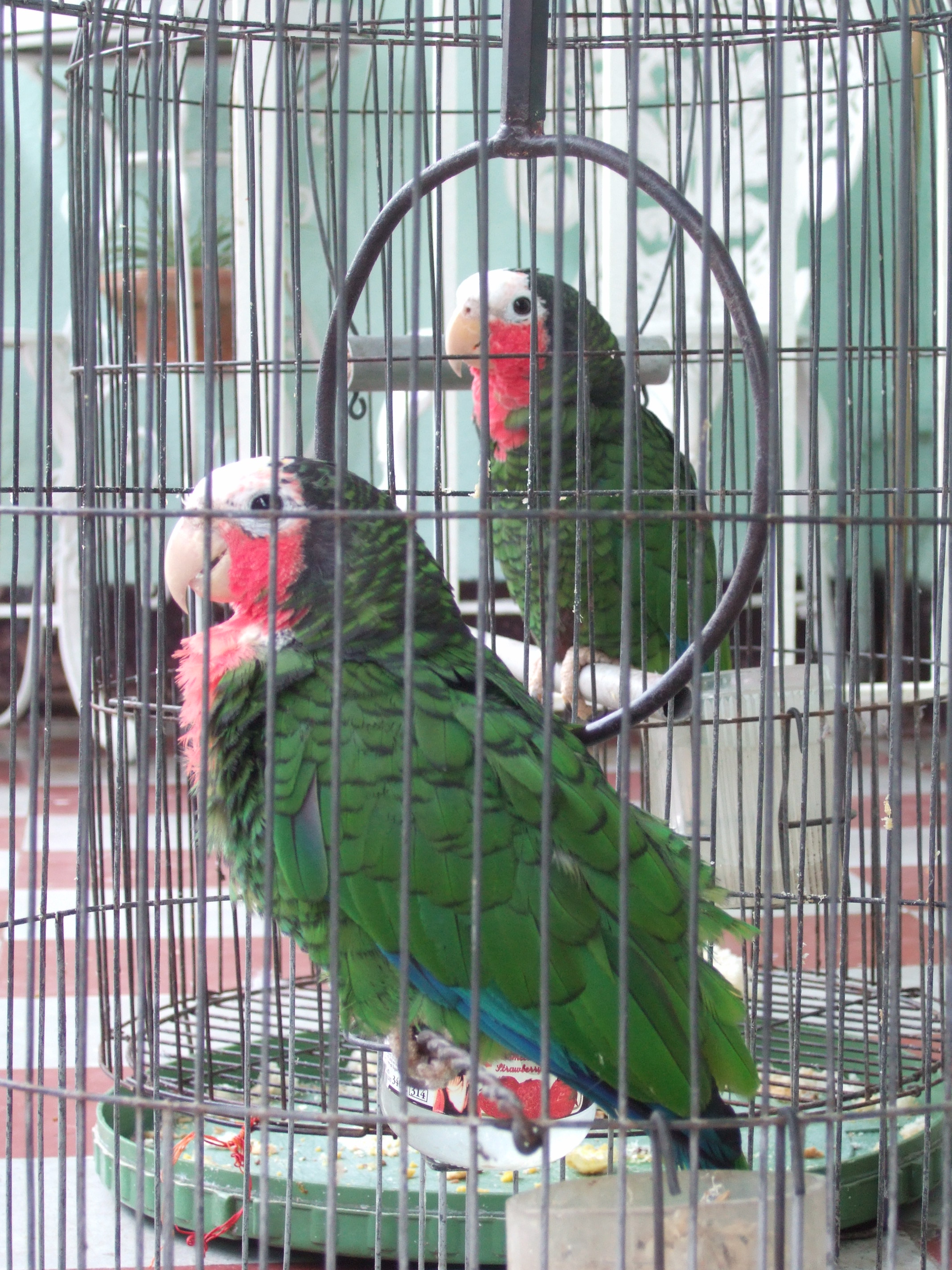
Pet Cuban amazons in Cuba

Parrots may not make good pets for most people because of their natural wild instincts such as screaming and chewing. Although parrots can be very affectionate and cute when immature, they often become aggressive when mature (partly due to mishandling and poor training) and may bite, causing serious injury. For this reason, parrot rescue groups estimate that most parrots are surrendered and rehomed through at least five homes before reaching their permanent destinations or before dying prematurely from unintentional or intentional neglect and abuse. The parrots' ability to mimic human words and their bright colours and beauty prompt impulse buying from unsuspecting consumers. The domesticated budgerigar, a small parrot, is the most popular of all pet bird species.

In 1992, the newspaper USA Today published that 11 million pet birds were in the United States alone, many of them parrots. Europeans kept birds matching the description of the rose-ringed parakeet (or called the ring-necked parrot), documented particularly in a first-century account by Pliny the Elder. As they have been prized for thousands of years for their beauty and ability to talk, they have also often been misunderstood. For example, author Wolfgang de Grahl says in his 1987 book The Grey Parrot that some importers had parrots drink only coffee while they were shipped by boat, believing that pure water was detrimental and that their actions would increase survival rates during shipping. Nowadays, it is commonly accepted that the caffeine in coffee is toxic to birds.

Pet parrots may be kept in a cage or aviary; though generally, tame parrots should be allowed out regularly on a stand or gym. Depending on locality, parrots may be either wild-caught or be captive-bred, though in most areas without native parrots, pet parrots are captive-bred. Parrot species that are commonly kept as pets include conures, macaws, amazon parrots, cockatoos, greys, lovebirds, cockatiels, budgerigars, caiques, parakeets, and Eclectus, Pionus, and Poicephalus species. Temperaments and personalities vary even within a species, just as with dog breeds. Grey parrots are thought to be excellent talkers, but not all grey parrots want to talk, though they have the capability to do so. Noise level, talking ability, cuddliness with people, and care needs can sometimes depend on how the bird is cared for and the attention he/she regularly receives.

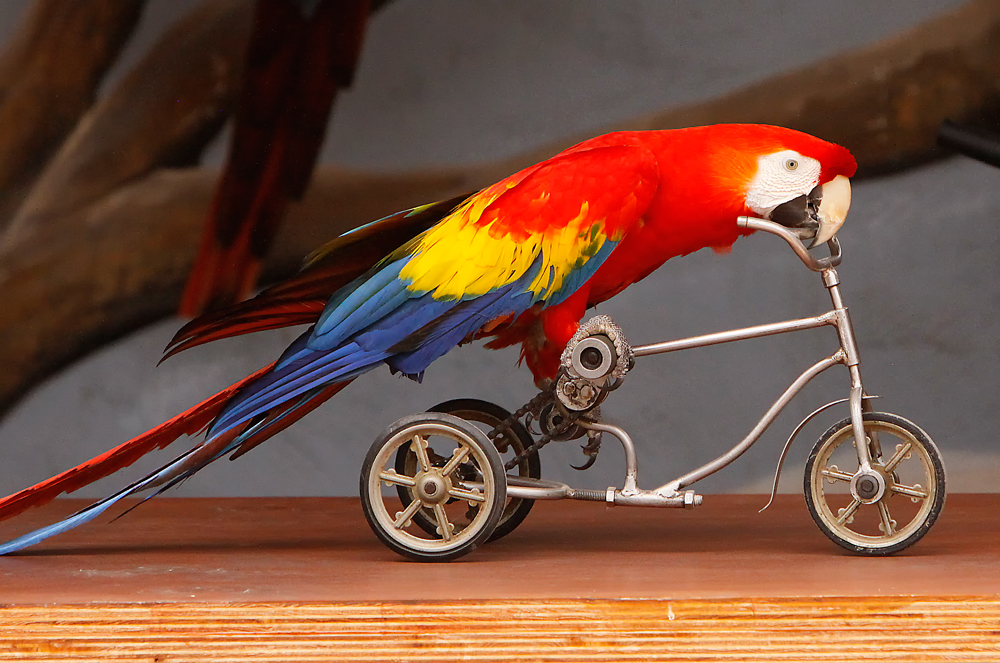
Scarlet macaw riding a tricycle at a show in Spain

Parrots invariably require an enormous amount of attention, care, and intellectual stimulation to thrive, akin to that required by a three-year-old child, which many people find themselves unable to provide in the long term. Parrots that are bred for pets may be hand-fed or otherwise accustomed to interacting with people from a young age to help ensure they become tame and trusting. However, even when hand fed, parrots revert to biting and aggression during hormonal surges and if mishandled or neglected. Parrots are not low-maintenance pets; they require feeding, grooming, veterinary care, training, and environmental enrichment through the provision of toys, exercise, and social interaction (with other parrots or humans) for good health.

Some large parrot species, including large cockatoos, amazons, and macaws, have very long lifespans, with 80 years being reported, and record ages of over 100. Small parrots, such as lovebirds, hanging parrots, and budgies, have shorter lifespans up to 15–20 years. Some parrot species can be quite loud, and many of the larger parrots can be destructive and require a very large cage, and a regular supply of new toys, branches, or other items to chew up. The intelligence of parrots means they are quick to learn tricks and other behaviours—both good and bad—that get them what they want, such as attention or treats.

The popularity, longevity, and intelligence of many of the larger kinds of pet parrots and their wild traits such as screaming, has led to many birds needing to be rehomed during the course of their long lifespans. A common problem is that large parrots that are cuddly and gentle as juveniles mature into intelligent, complex, often demanding adults who can outlive their owners, and can also become aggressive or even dangerous. Due to an increasing number of homeless parrots, they are being euthanised like dogs and cats, and parrot adoption centres and sanctuaries are becoming more common. Parrots do not often do well in captivity, causing some parrots to go insane and develop repetitive behaviours, such as swaying and screaming, or they become riddled with intense fear. Feather destruction and self-mutilation, although not commonly seen in the wild, occur often in captivity.

Some owners have offered their pet parrots mobile apps for entertainment. Scientists Rébecca Kleinberger of Northeastern University and Ilyena Hirskyj-Douglas of the University of Glasgow performed a pilot study to tailor apps to parrots' preferences. The birds tended to use rapid tongue movements to interact with screens, possibly mimicking movements used to manipulate seeds. To motivate parrots participating in the pilot study, researchers used treats such as peanut butter, yoghurt and pine nuts; one bird responded better to "cheering and praise".

=== Trade ===
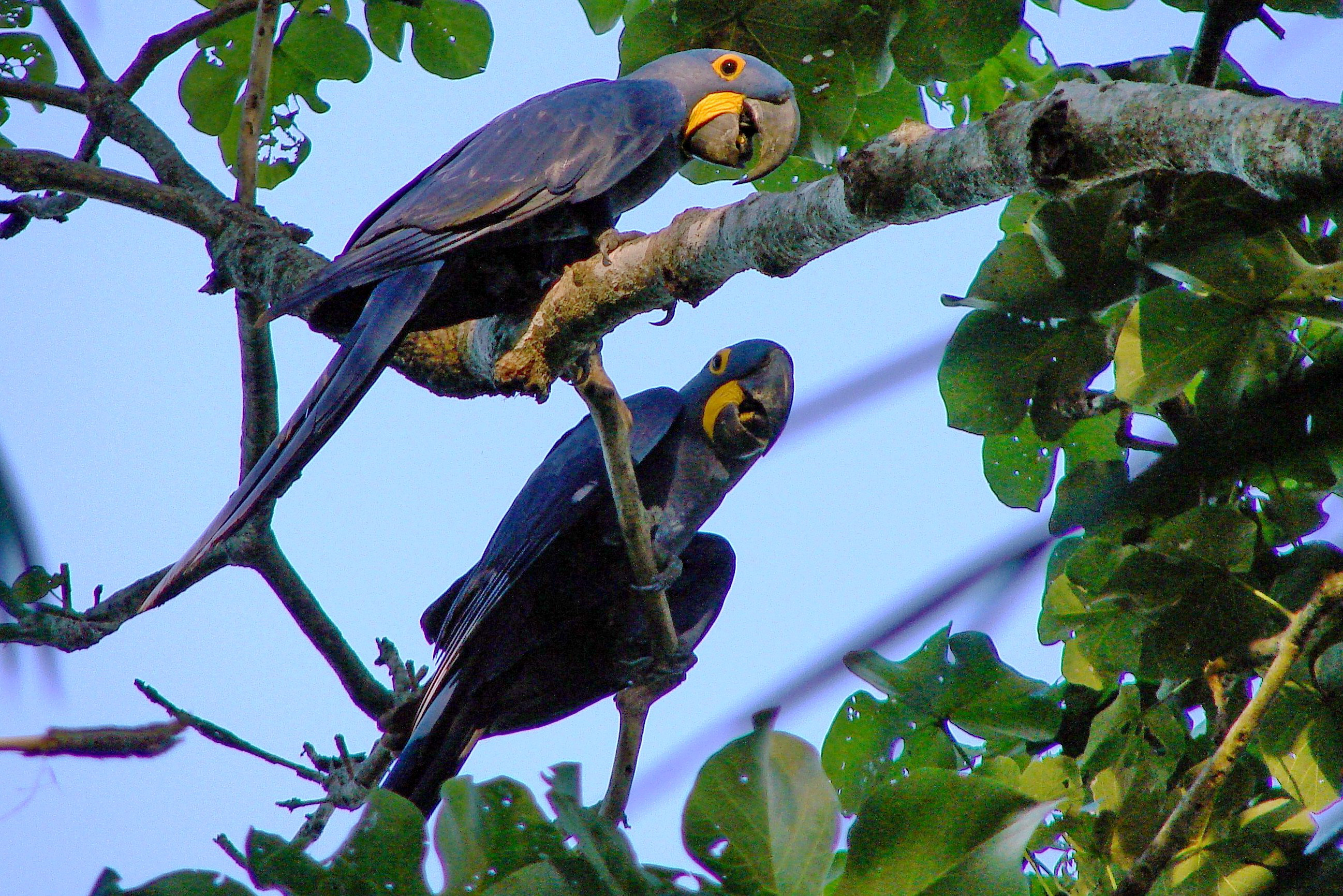
Hyacinth macaws were taken from the wild for the pet trade in the 1980s. As a result, Brazil now has only a very small number of breeding pairs left in the wild.

The popularity of parrots as pets has led to a thriving—and often illegal—trade in the birds, and some species are now threatened with extinction. A combination of trapping of wild birds and damage to parrot habitats makes survival difficult or even impossible for some species of parrot. Importation of wild-caught parrots into the US and Europe is illegal after the Wild Bird Population Act was passed in 1992.

The scale of the problem can be seen in the Tony Silva case of 1996, in which a parrot expert and former director at Tenerife's Loro Parque (Europe's largest parrot park) was jailed in the United States for 82 months and fined $100,000 for smuggling hyacinth macaws (such birds command a very high price.)

Different nations have different methods of handling internal and international trade. Australia has banned the export of its native birds since 1960. In July 2007, following years of campaigning by NGOs and outbreaks of avian flu, the European Union (EU) halted the importation of all wild birds with a permanent ban on their import. Prior to an earlier temporary ban started in late October 2005, the EU was importing about two million live birds a year, about 90% of the international market: hundreds of thousands of these were parrots. No national laws protect feral parrot populations in the U.S.

Mexico has a licensing system for capturing and selling native birds. According to a 2007 report, 65,000 to 78,500 parrots are captured annually, but the mortality rate before reaching a buyer is over 75%, meaning around 50,000 to 60,000 will die.

=== Culture ===
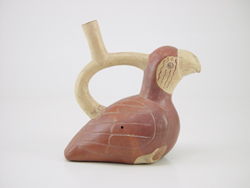
Moche parrot, 200 CE Larco Museum Collection Lima, Peru

Parrots have featured in human writings, story, art, humor, religion, and music for thousands of years, such as Aesop's fable "The parrot and the cat", the mention "The parrot can speak, and yet is nothing more than a bird" in The Book of Rites of Ancient China, the Masnavi by Rumi of Persia in 1250 "The Merchant and the Parrot". Recent books about parrots in human culture include Parrot Culture.

In ancient times and current, parrot feathers have been used in ceremonies and for decoration. They also have a long history as pets, stretching back thousands of years, and were often kept as a symbol of royalty or wealth.

Parrots are used as symbols of nations and nationalism. A parrot is found on the flag of Dominica and two parrots on their coat of arms. The St. Vincent parrot is the national bird of St. Vincent and the Grenadines, a Caribbean nation.

Sayings about parrots colour the modern English language. The verb "parrot" in the dictionary means "to repeat by rote". Also clichés such as the British expression "sick as a parrot" are given; although this refers to extreme disappointment rather than illness, it may originate from the disease of psittacosis, which can be passed to humans. The first occurrence of a related expression is in Aphra Behn's 1681 play The False Count. Fans of Jimmy Buffett are known as parrotheads. Parrots feature in many media. Magazines are devoted to parrots as pets, and to the conservation of parrots. Fictional media include Monty Python's "Dead Parrot sketch", Home Alone 3 and Rio; and documentaries include The Wild Parrots of Telegraph Hill.

Parrots have been a food source to several groups. Australian settlers made parrot pies, while the Maori hunted kākāpō for their meat and feathers.

Every year on 31 May, World Parrot Day is celebrated around the world.

==== Mythology ====
As early as the ancient Chinese Shang dynasty (c. 1600 BCE – 1045 BCE), jade artifacts are found crafted in the shape of parrots and were subjected to burning over wood along with other jade objects and livestock, likely as a part of ritual sacrifices known as 'Liao' sacrifices (燎祭), generating smoke offerings to the heavens, gods and ancestors. This ritual is believed to have been inherited from previous worship practices and continued into the Zhou dynasty. A jade parrot, among other artifacts, recovered from the tomb of Fu Hao at Yinxu provides significant evidence of this practice.

In Polynesian legend as current in the Marquesas Islands, the hero Laka/Aka is mentioned as having undertaken a long and dangerous voyage to Aotona in what are now the Cook Islands, to obtain the highly prized feathers of a red parrot as gifts for his son and daughter. On the voyage, 100 of his 140 rowers died of hunger on their way, but the survivors reached Aotona and captured enough parrots to fill 140 bags with their feathers.

Parrots have also been considered sacred. The Moche people of ancient Peru worshipped birds and often depicted parrots in their art. Parrots are popular in Buddhist scripture and many writings about them exist. For example, Amitābha once changed himself into a parrot to aid in converting people. Another old story tells how after a forest caught fire, the parrot was so concerned, it carried water to try to put out the flames. The ruler of heaven was so moved upon seeing the parrot's act, he sent rain to put out the fire. In Chinese Buddhist iconography, a parrot is sometimes depicted hovering on the upper right side Guan Yin clasping a pearl or prayer beads in its beak.

In Hindu mythology, the parrot is the mount of the god of love, Kamadeva. The bird is also associated with the goddess Meenakshi and the poet-saint Andal.

=== Feral populations ===
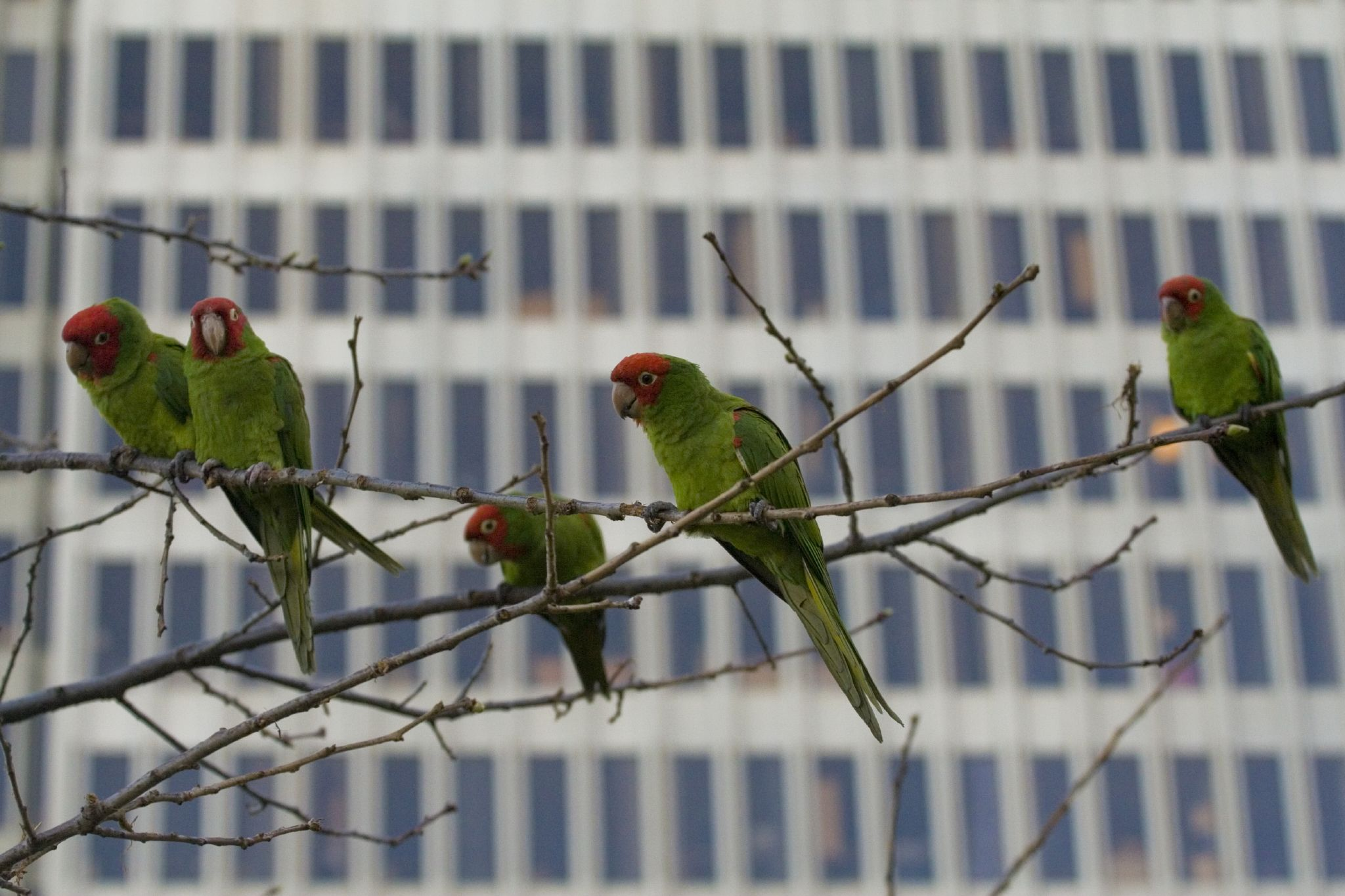
Feral red-masked parakeets in San Francisco

Escaped parrots of several species have become established in the wild outside their natural ranges and in some cases outside the natural range of parrots. Among the earliest instances were pet red shining-parrots from Fiji, which established a population on the islands of southern Tonga. These introductions were prehistoric and red-shining parrots were recorded in Tonga by Captain Cook in the 1770s. Escapees first began breeding in cities in California, Texas, and Florida in the 1950s (with unproven earlier claims dating to the 1920s in Texas and Florida). They have proved surprisingly hardy in adapting to conditions in Europe and North America. They sometimes even multiply to the point of becoming a nuisance or pest, and a threat to local ecosystems, and control measures have been used on some feral populations.

Feral parrot flocks can be formed after mass escapes of newly imported, wild-caught parrots from airports or quarantine facilities. Large groups of escapees have the protection of a flock and possess the skills to survive and breed in the wild. Some feral parakeets may have descended from escaped zoo birds. Escaped or released pets rarely contribute to establishing feral populations, as they usually result in only a few escapees, and most captive-born birds do not possess the necessary survival skills to find food or avoid predators and often do not survive long without human caretakers. However, in areas where there are existing feral parrot populations, escaped pets may sometimes successfully join these flocks. The most common years that feral parrots were released to non-native environments was from the 1890s to the 1940s, during the wild-caught parrot era. In the "parrot fever" panic of 1930, a city health commissioner urged everyone who owned a parrot to put them down, but some owners abandoned their parrots on the streets.

=== Threats and conservation ===
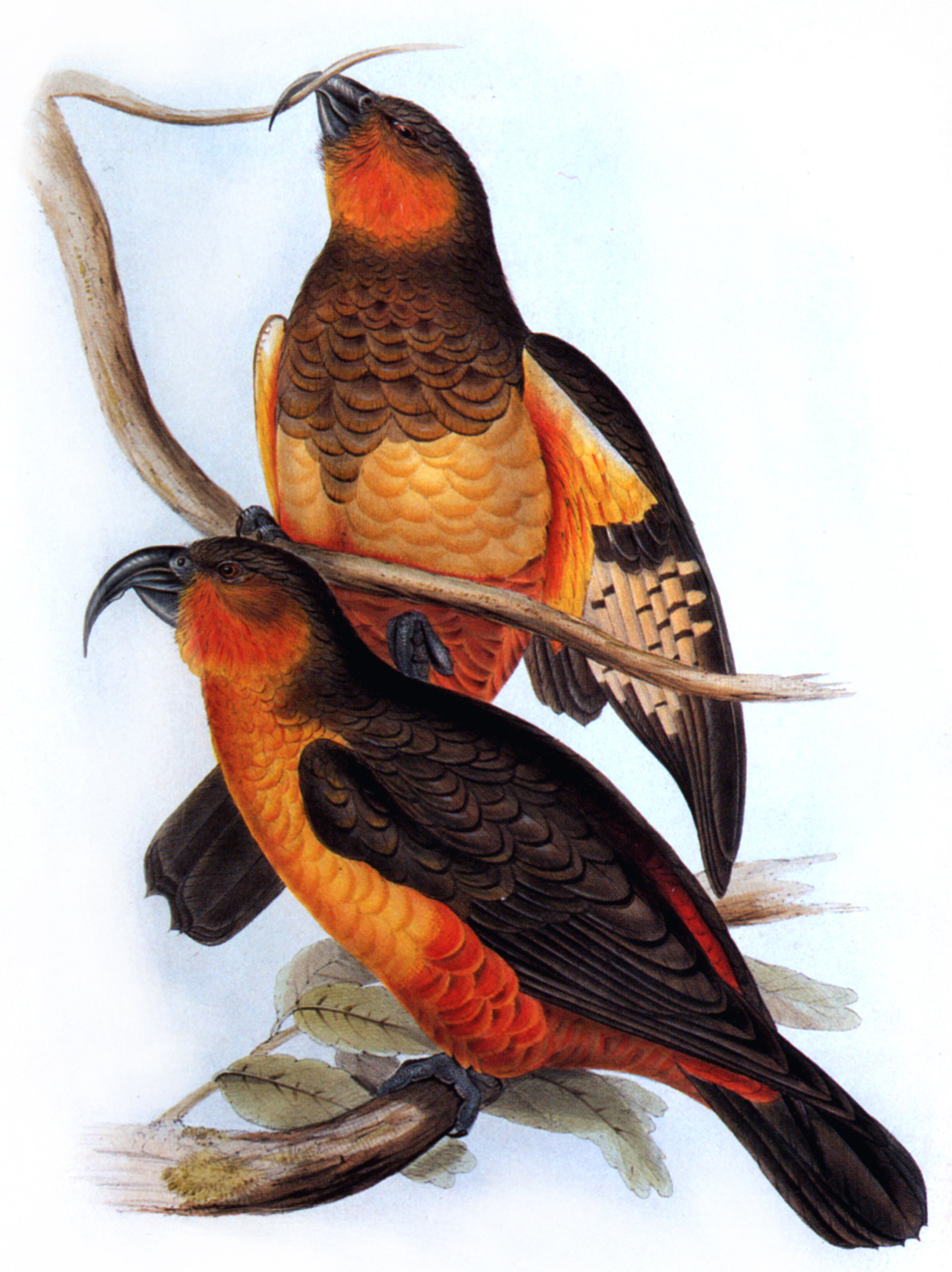
The Norfolk kākā went extinct in the mid-1800s due to overhunting and habitat loss.

The principal threats of parrots are habitat loss and degradation, hunting, and, for certain species, the wild-bird trade. Parrots are persecuted because, in some areas, they are (or have been) hunted for food and feathers, and as agricultural pests. For a time, Argentina offered a bounty on monk parakeets for that reason, resulting in hundreds of thousands of birds being killed, though apparently this did not greatly affect the overall population.

Parrots, being cavity nesters, are vulnerable to the loss of nesting sites and to competition with introduced species for those sites. The loss of old trees is a particular problem in some areas, particularly in Australia, where suitable nesting trees must be centuries old. Many parrots occur only on islands and are vulnerable to introduced species such as rats and feral cat, as they lack the appropriate antipredator behaviours needed to deal with predators. Island species, such as the Puerto Rican amazon, which have small populations in restricted habitats, are also vulnerable to natural events, such as hurricanes. Due to deforestation, the Puerto Rican amazon is one of the world's rarest birds despite conservation efforts.

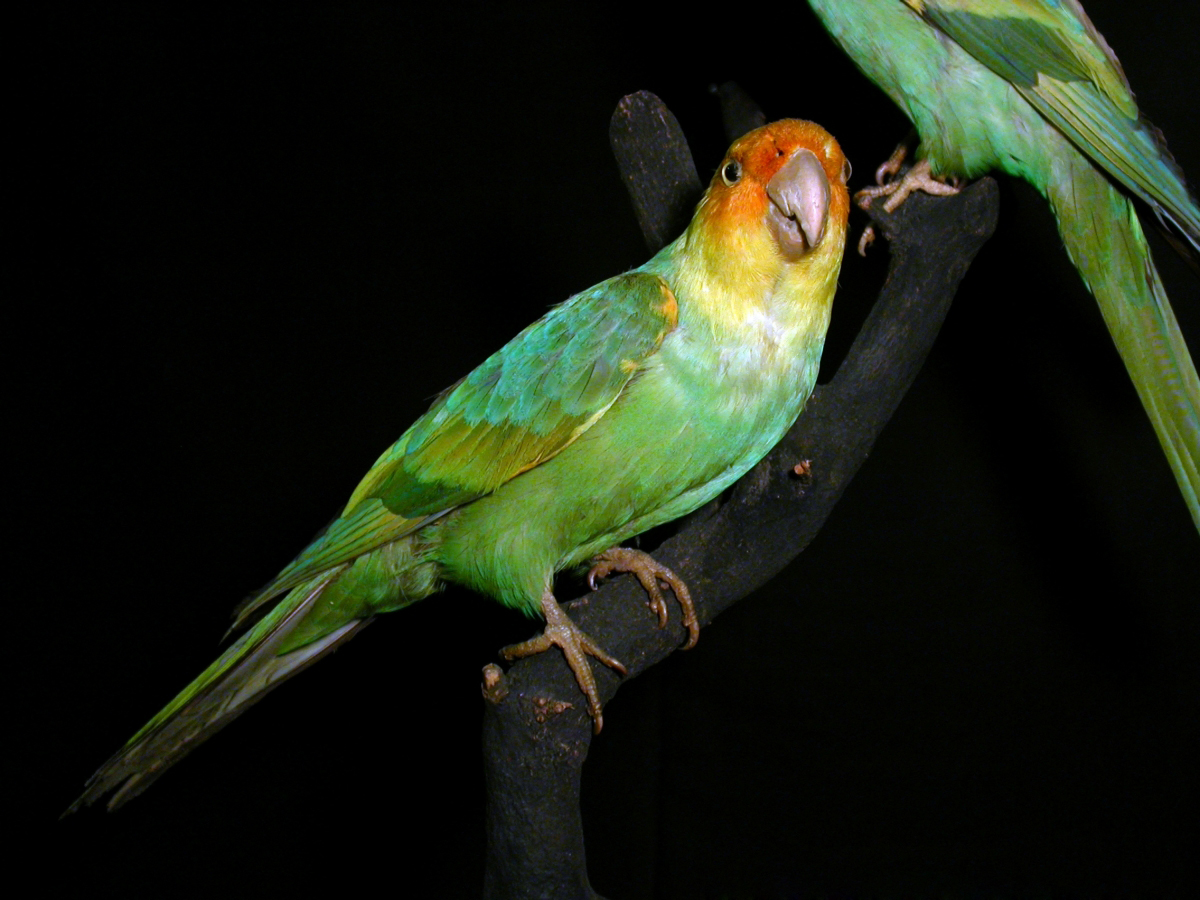
A mounted specimen of the Carolina parakeet, which was hunted to extinction

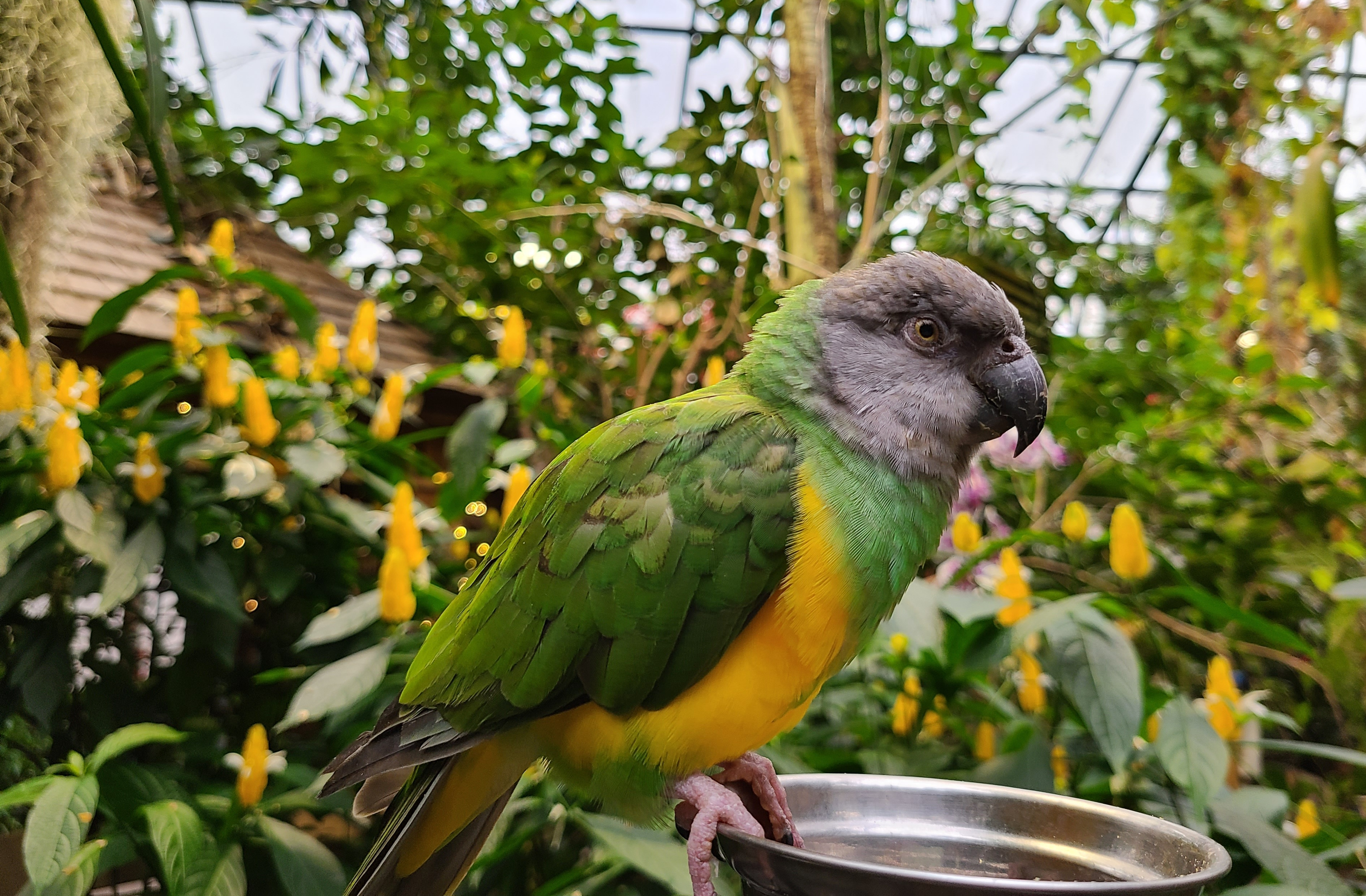
Senegal parrot in conservatory

One of the largest parrot conservation groups is the World Parrot Trust, an international organisation. The group gives assistance to worthwhile projects, as well as producing a magazine (PsittaScene) and raising funds through donations and memberships, often from pet parrot owners. On a smaller scale, local parrot clubs raise money to donate to a conservation cause. Zoo and wildlife centres usually provide public education, to change habits that cause damage to wild populations. Conservation measures to conserve the habitats of some of the high-profile charismatic parrot species has also protected many of the less charismatic species living in the ecosystem. A popular attraction that many zoos employ is a feeding station for lories and lorikeets, where visitors feed them with cups of liquid food. This is usually done in association with educational signs and lectures. Birdwatching-based ecotourism can be beneficial to economies.

Several projects aimed specifically at parrot conservation have met with success. Translocation of vulnerable kākāpō, followed by intensive management and supplementary feeding, has increased the population from 50 individuals to 123 in 2010 and 247 in 2024. In New Caledonia, the Ouvea parakeet was threatened by trapping for the pet trade and loss of habitat. Community-based conservation, which eliminated the threat of poaching, has allowed the population to increase from around 600 birds in 1993 to over 2,000 birds in 2009.

As of 2009, the IUCN recognises 19 species of parrot as extinct since 1500 (the date used to denote modern extinctions). This does not include species like the New Caledonian lorikeet, which has not been officially seen for 100 years, yet is still listed as critically endangered.

Trade, export, and import of all wild-caught parrots is regulated and only permitted under special licensed circumstances in countries party to the Convention on the International Trade in Endangered Species (CITES) which came into force in 1975 to regulate the international trade of all endangered, wild-caught animal and plant species. In 1975, 24 parrot species were included in Appendix I, thus prohibiting commercial international trade in these birds. Since that initial listing, continuing threats from international trade led it to add an additional 32 parrot varieties to Appendix I. All other parrot species, aside from the rosy-faced lovebird, budgerigar, cockatiel and rose-ringed parakeet (which are not included in the appendices) are protected on Appendix II of CITES. In addition, individual countries may have laws to regulate trade in certain species; for example, the EU has banned parrot trade, whereas Mexico has a licensing system for capturing parrots.

== See also ==
- List of parrots
- Parrots of New Guinea
- Parrots of New Zealand

== Cited sources ==
- Cameron, Matt (2007). Cameron, Matt (ed.). Cockatoos. Collingwood, VIC, Australia: CSIRO Publishing. doi:10.1071/9780643095588. ISBN 978-0-643-09232-7. OCLC 1453274155.
