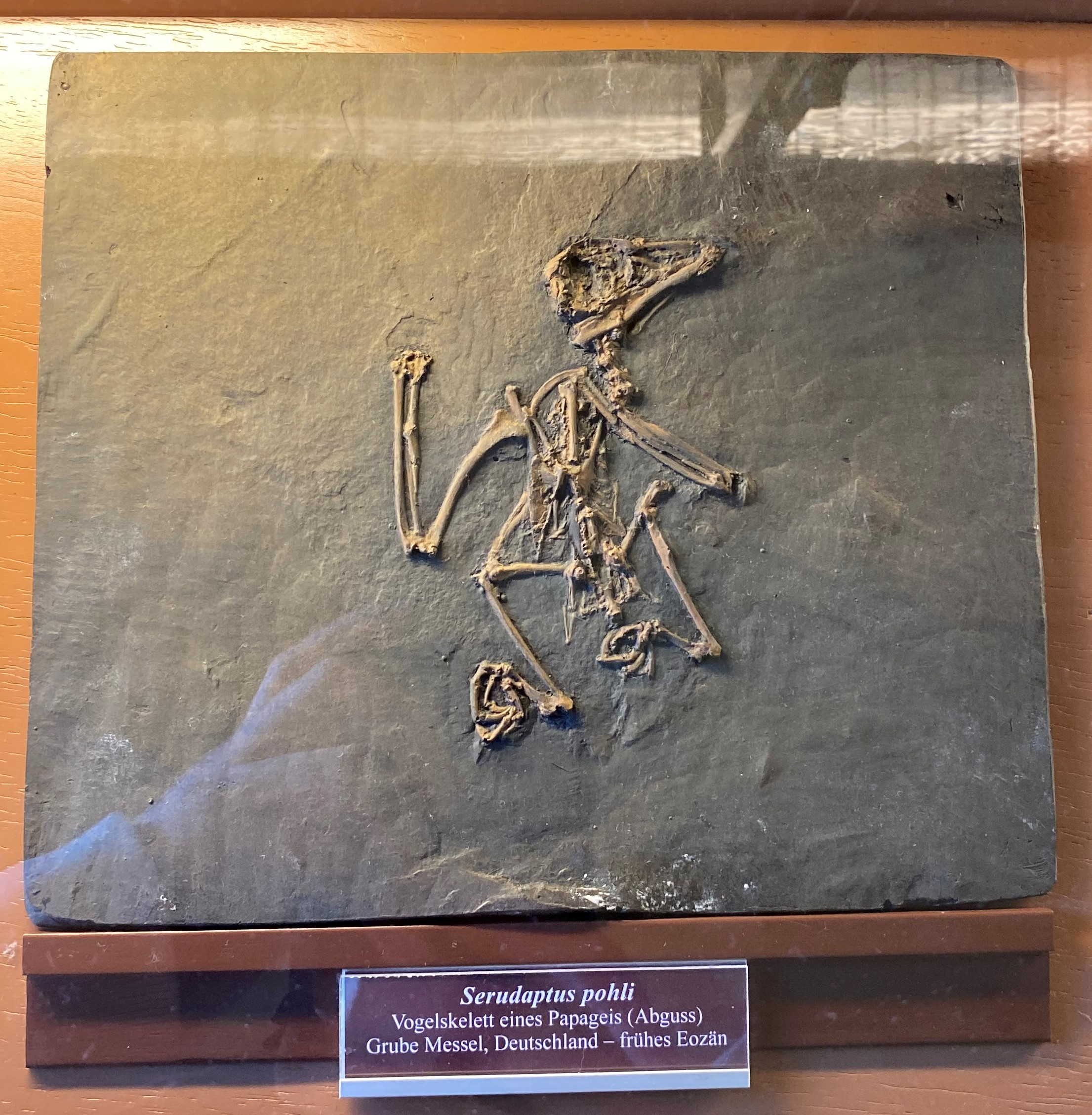
- Cast of the holotype of Serudaptus, a halcyornithid, at the Natural History Museum of Vienna

Scientific classification
- Kingdom: Animalia
- Phylum: Chordata
- Class: Aves
- Clade: Australaves
- Clade: Eufalconimorphae
- Family: †Halcyornithidae; Harrison & Walker, 1972

Genera
- †Cyrilavis Martin, 2010; †Halcyornis Owen, 1846; †Pseudasturides Mayr, 1998; †Pulchrapollia Dyke & Cooper, 2000; †Serudaptus Mayr, 2000

Synonyms
- Pseudasturidae (Mayr, 2002)

= Halcyornithidae =

Halcyornithidae Temporal range: Early-Middle Eocene

Extinct family of birds

Halcyornithidae is an extinct family of telluravian birds thought to be closely related to the parrots (Psittaciformes) and songbirds (Passeriformes), and probably even more closely to the extinct Messelasturidae with which they are usually united in order Halcyornithiformes. Halcyornithids have been found in various Eocene formations in Europe and North America starting about 55 mya; slightly older remains (60 mya) may or may not belong to this family with certainty. Widespread and diverse in the Early Eocene of North America and Europe, halcyornithids are not found in locales later than the Middle Eocene, where they have so far been discovered in Central Europe only.

Halcyornithids were small, arboreal birds with zygodactyl feet, with two toes facing forwards and two facing back, a trait shared with other tree-dwelling families of Eocene birds like the Zygodactylidae and the messelasturids. The skull of halcyornithids features a ridge of bone above the eye called the supraorbital process, similar to birds of prey.

== Description ==
Halcyornithids are recognisable by details of the skull and limbs. The tarsometatarsus, the lowermost bone of the leg, is short and shaped like those of parrots. The distal end of the tarsometatarsus has a projection of bone that supports the fourth toe, which is reversed and faces backwards. Unlike in parrots, however, this projection is not separated by a groove from the rest of the trochlea supporting the other toes. The third toe is strongly built, more so than the others. The humerus is long and slender, and the coracoid is shaped like that found in owls, and has a foramen for the supracoracoideus nerve.

The skulls of halcyornithids bear a prominent shelf of bone above the upper margin of the eye, the supraorbital process, comparable to that present in falcons and other birds of prey. One proposed function of the supraorbital process is mechanical protection of the eyeball from injury, for example, such as might be caused by struggling prey animals being killed with the beak. The morphology of the head is overall similar to that of messelasturids, but in halcyornithids, the mandible is proportionally much longer.

== Distribution ==
A high diversity of halcyornithid birds is found in the Eocene London Clay in England, from sites near Walton-on-the-Naze and the Isle of Sheppey. Of the specimens collected from that location, almost none do not bear minor morphological dissimilarities to others, indicating that there were likely many species living in the area, comprising an adaptive radiation. Halcyornithids are also known from the Messel Pit, in Germany, where specimens likewise exhibit diversity.

Other halcyornithid-bearing sites in Europe include the Geisel Valley of Germany which has produced the most recent evidence of halcyornithids of Middle Eocene age, the Fur Formation in Denmark, and the Tielt Formation at Egem in Belgium. From the Paleocene Konservat-Lagerstätte Menat in France a possible halcyornithid skeleton is known, but this may just as well might be a messelasturid or basal halcyornithiform. In North America, halcyornithids have been found in the Early Eocene Green River Formation of the US state of Utah and the roughly contemporary Nanjemoy Formation of the state of Virginia.

Halcyornithids thrived for some 10-15 million years, but despite being a widespread and probably fairly common component of the local avifauna of the North Sea basin region of western and central Europa, and initially also of much of North America except for the Pacific lowlands, they failed to expand more widely, and ultimately went extinct like their presumed relatives Messelasturidae and Vastanavidae during a phase of pronounced climate upheaval.

== Classification ==
The relationships of the halcyornithids to other birds remain uncertain. The first fossil to be discovered, of namesake genus Halcyornis, lacked the facial portion of the skull, and was initially mistaken for a tiny seagull or a kingfisher. Subsequently, Halcyornithids were proposed as relatives to owls or considered Coraciiformes or stem group members of the parrot lineage. Most recently, they have been identified as the sister group of the clade including parrots and songbirds or part of a larger such lineage in addition to or paraphyletic with Messelasturidae.

Placement of the Halcyornithidae after Ksepka et al., 2019.

- - Cariamiformes (seriemas and kin)
  - - Falconiformes (falcons)
    - - Halcyornithidae
      - - Psittaciformes (parrots)
        - - Psittacopedidae
          - - Zygodactylidae
            - Passeriformes (songbirds)

Internal classification of Halcyornithiformes after Mayr & Kitchener, 2022.

- - Pseudasturides
  - - Cyrilavis
    - - Serudaptus
      - Messelasturidae
        - Messelastur
        - Tynskya
