= Halcyornis =

Halcyornis Temporal range: Early Eocene

Scientific classification
- Kingdom: Animalia
- Phylum: Chordata
- Class: Aves
- Clade: Eufalconimorphae
- Family: †Halcyornithidae
- Genus: †Halcyornis; Owen, 1846

Type species
- †Larus toliapicus (König 1825)

Extinct genus of birds

Halcyornis is an extinct genus of halcyornithid bird. It is known from a single neurocranium from the Early Eocene London Clay of southeastern England, and contains a single species, Halcyornis toliapicus. The type specimen of Halcyornis was the first fossil bird to be scientifically named.

== Discovery and naming ==
The type specimen of Halcyornis toliapicus was discovered and described in 1825 as Larus toliapicus and characterised as a small gull. This was the first time a fossil bird received a scientific description. In 1846, Richard Owen named the genus Halcyornis, in reference to the kingfishers, an obsolete name for which was Halcyonidae. The generic name refers to supposed affinities to tree kingfishers.

== Description ==
The limited preservation of the single specimen of Halcyornis, part of a single braincase, precludes statements on the postcranial skeleton or for the rostral head. The cranium is not hyperinflated. Preservation of the cranial endocast allows for digital modelling of the brain. The skull axis is relatively straight and the brain is not strongly flexed as in crown Psittaciformes. The olfactory lobes were large relative to the telencephalon. The wulst is larger than in other Eocene psittacopasserans and is comparable in extent to that found in modern parrots. The cerebellum is larger than in many related extant taxa. The endosseous cochlear duct is long, and Halcyornis is predicted to have had a mean hearing value of 5900 Hz and to be most sensitive to sounds around 3400 Hz.

== Classification ==
Halcyornis is a member of the Halcyornithidae, a family of Eocene birds known from the early Eocene of Europe and North America. Halcyornithids are regarded as basal relatives of both parrots and songbirds.

Halcyornis toliapicus was initially described as a gull, on the basis of anatomical features of the eye. The species' subsequent reassignment to a new genus also corresponded to a reassignment to the tree-kingfishers. Further study continued to identify the specimen as at least coraciimorph in nature. In 2007, the discovery of two new specimens of Pseudasturides with similar morphology of the skull to Halcyornis led to the reassignment of the genus to the family "Pseudasturidae". As Halcyornis is an older taxon than Pseudasturides, "Pseudasturidae" is a junior synonym to Halcyornithidae, the proper name for the family of Eocene basal psittacopasserans.
