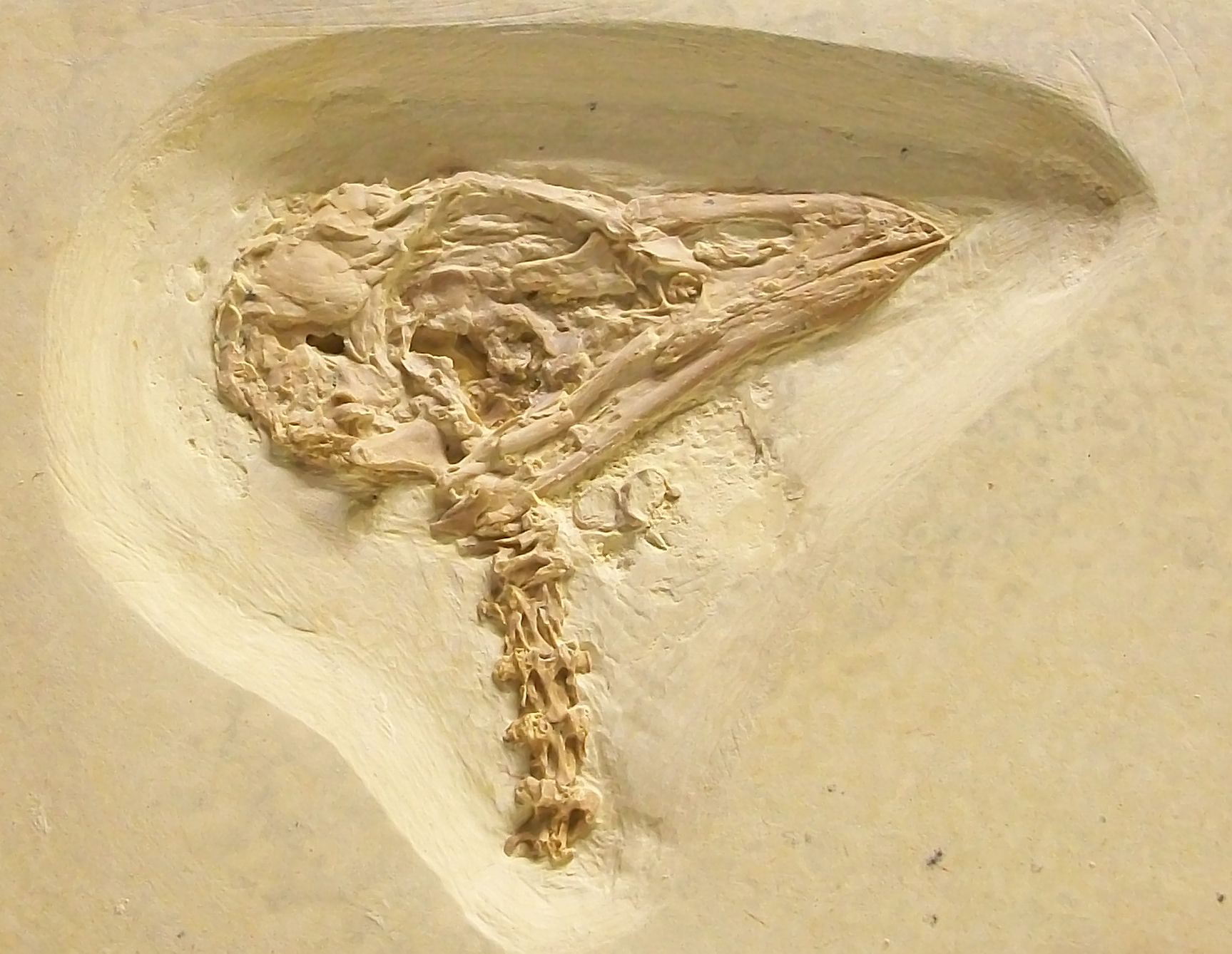
- Skull of C. colburnorum

Scientific classification
- Domain: Eukaryota
- Kingdom: Animalia
- Phylum: Chordata
- Class: Aves
- Order: †Halcyornithiformes
- Family: †Halcyornithidae
- Genus: †Cyrilavis; Martin, 2010

Type species
- †Primobucco olsoni (Feduccia & Martin, 1976)

= Cyrilavis =

Cyrilavis Temporal range: Early Eocene, 51.6 Ma

Extinct genus of birds

Cyrilavis is an extinct genus of halcyornithid bird from the Early Eocene Fossil Butte Member of the Green River Formation, United States. The genus contains two species, Cyrilavis olsoni and Cyrilavis colburnorum.

== Discovery and naming ==
A complete skeleton of a bird from the Green River Formation was described as "Primobucco" olsoni in 1976 from the specimens GSATC 217 as a relative to the Bucconidae based on its zygodactyl foot configuration. The specific ephitet olsoni referred to Storrs L. Olson. In 2002, the specimen was recognised as having psittacine affinities by Mayr. In 2010 the genus Cyrilavis was erected to accomdoate the halcyornithid, since it was no longer thought to be closely related to the Bucconidae, with the new name Cyrilavis olsoni. The generic name Cyrilavis is in honour of Cyril Walker, a notable paleontologist of early Cenozoic birds. In 2011, Ksepka et al. described a new species, Cyrilavis colburnorum, with the holotype FMNH PA 754, a nearly complete skeleton. Another specimen of C. colburnorum, FMNH PA 766, preserved both feet and much of the legs and wings. A third specimen is not referred to either species.

== Description ==
Cyrilavis was a relatively large-headed bird. The beak is about half of the total length of the head, and is dorsoventrally expanded. The lower half of the beak remains shallow while the top half is comparatively tall. As in all other halcyornithids and in the psittacopasseran Psittacopes, the manus is much shorter than the ulna. This is the opposite of the condition found in extant parrots.

Cyrilavis olsoni, whose holotype preserves feathering, shows a halo of feathers around the head, interpreted as a crest.

== Classification ==
The holotype of Cyrilavis was initially referred to the Primobucconidae, a family of stem puffbirds. Later revisions resulted in the genus' interpretation as a stem parrot. Recent analyses have found that the Halcyornithidae, to which Cyrilavis belongs, diverged before the split between parrots and passerines, meaning it is equally closely related to both orders.
