= Pseudasturides =

Pseudasturides Temporal range: Ypresian

Scientific classification
- Kingdom: Animalia
- Phylum: Chordata
- Class: Aves
- Clade: Eufalconimorphae
- Family: †Halcyornithidae
- Genus: †Pseudasturides; Mayr, 1998

Type species
- †Pseudasturides macrocephalus (Mayr, 1998)

Synonyms
- Pseudastur Mayr, 1998 (Preocc.)

Extinct genus of birds

Pseudasturides is an extinct genus of halcyornithid bird from the Middle Eocene Messel pit in Hesse, Germany, and possibly the Isle of Sheppey, United Kingdom. The genus is represented by a single species, Pseudasturides macrocephalus.

== Discovery and naming ==
Pseudasturides macrocephalus was named in 1998 as "Pseudastur" macrocephalus with holotype WDC-C-MG 94, a complete, articulated skeleton . Several other specimens were also referred to the new genus, including another complete, articulated skeleton, an articulated cranial skeleton, a nearly complete skeleton, and a partial skeleton. The referred specimens differ slightly in size and morphology compared to the holotype, and their assignment was tentative. The generic name Pseudasturides ("Pseudastur" before emendation) is derived from Greek pseudo, meaning false, and Latin astur, meaning a raptorial bird, and is in reference to the similarity of Pseudasturides to Messelastur. The specific ephitet macrocephalus is from Greek makrocephalos, meaning large-headed, in reference to the proprtionally large head found in the species.

Further specimens from the Isle of Sheppey in England have been tentatively assigned to Pseudasturides macrocephalus, including a partial skeleton with skull fragments, as well as the distal part of a tarsometatarsus.

== Description ==
Pseudasturides is typical of the Halcyornithidae, and that family was erected on the basis of Pseudasturides. Pseudasturides was a small bird, with a large head relative to its body. The cranium is rounded, and the beak is robust and short, measuring approximately one-third of the length of the skull. The upper half of the beak is wide at its base and deep when viewed from the side. There is a strong, falcon-like supraorbital process, a bony ridge above the eye.The tarsometatarsi are relatively stout, and there is a zygodactyl foot arrangement with the fourth toe opposed to the second and third toes. Whereas extant birds usually possess 19 or more presacral vertebrae, the holotype of Pseudasturides had only 18. One specimen preserves impressions of the wing feathers, showing that the wings of Pseudasturides were short and rounded, similar in form to those of larks. On the basis of zygodactyly and the short tarsometatarsus, Pseudasturides is presumed to have had an arboreal lifestyle.

== Classification ==
Pseudasturides is a member of the family Halcyornithidae, a group of Eocene birds related to parrots and songbirds. The position of the Halcyornithidae is not certain, but phylogenetic analyses constrained to molecular phylogenies suggest that the Halcyornithidae are the sister taxon to the Psittacopasseres or to the Messelasturidae. Previously, Pseudasturides (as with other Halcyornithidae) had been classified as more closely related to parrots than to songbirds.
