= Masillastrix =

Masillastrix Temporal range: Middle Eocene (Lutetian), ~47.2 Ma
- Holotype under different preparation stages, including stomach contents in inset (A)

Scientific classification
- Kingdom: Animalia
- Phylum: Chordata
- Class: Aves
- Order: Strigiformes
- Family: †Protostrigidae (?)
- Genus: †Masillastrix; Mayr in Mayr et al., 2026
- Species: †M. blattophaga

Binomial name
- †Masillastrix blattophaga Mayr in Mayr et al., 2026

Genus of extinct bird

Masillastrix (lit. 'Messel owl') is an extinct genus of stem-owl known from the mid-Eocene (Lutetian age) Messel Pit of Germany. The genus contains a single species, Masillastrix blattophaga, known from a nearly complete postcranial skeleton preserved on a slab and counterslab. This specimen is the first owl fossil with well-preserved feathers from the tail and wings. Masillastrix is the second owl fossil described from the Messel Pit, following Palaeoglaux artophoron. The preserved stomach contents of the Masillastrix specimen reveal an iridescent cockroach, representing both the first instance of an insect as a fossil bird's last meal and the only known instance of an owl—extinct or otherwise—preying on this type of cockroach.

== Discovery and naming ==
The Masillastrix fossil material was discovered by Bruno Behr during an excavation in 2025 at outcrops of the Messel Formation near in Messel, Darmstadt-Dieburg, Germany. The specimen was taken to the Senckenberg Research Institute in Frankfurt, where Behr prepared it, and it is now permanently accessioned as specimen SMF-ME 11964. It consists of a nearly complete skeleton missing most of the skull and the tip of the left forelimb, flattened on two opposing slabs, designated as A and B. Extensive feather traces are preserved around the wings and tail, the first such occurrence in a fossil owl.

In 2026, Gerald Mayr and colleagues described Masillastrix blattophaga as a new genus and species of early owl based on these fossil remains, designating SMF-ME 11964 as the holotype specimen. The generic name, Masillastrix, combines the Latin name for Messel, Masilla, with the Latin strī̆x, meaning 'owl' (also the genus name of earless owls). The specific name, blattophaga, derives from Blatta, a cockroach genus, and the Greek word φᾰγεῖν (phăgeîn), meaning 'to eat'.

Masillastrix is the second fossil owl named from the Messel Pit, following Palaeoglaux artophoron in 1992.

== Description and palaeobiology ==
Stomach contents of the M. blattophaga holotype (E, F) compared to another iridescent Messel cockroach (G) and an extant specimen (H)

The M. blattophaga holotype belongs to an immature individual, indicated by the furrowed texture on the surface of the large limb bones. The metatarsals are fused, suggesting it had nearly reached its adult size, suggesting it was a fledgling (capable of flight but still reliant on parental care). The humerus (upper arm bone) is proportionately smaller, and with a wider upper end, than in all extant (living) owls, similar to Ypresiglaux. The tarsometatarsus is short and robust, like in Minerva. The unguals (claws) of the first and second toes of Masillastrix are notably larger than the unguals of the third and fourth toes, a feature characteristic of members of the family Protostrigidae, but distinct from the coeval Palaeoglaux and extant owls.

The preserved wing feather traces indicate that the primary feathers are proportionately short compared to extant owls (possibly related to its immature status). The outermost primary feather lacks any fraying; frayed edges are seen in most extant owls, and are an adaptation to sound reduction when flying. The tail feathers all have a similar length, contrasting with extant owls, where the tail is rounded. None of the wing or tail feathers exhibit the barred pattern seen in most modern owls.

The remains of an iridescent cockroach (family Blaberidae) were identified within the preserved stomach contents of the M. blattophaga holotype. No other fossil birds have been identified with insect remains as their last meal. While some modern owls are insectivorous, and at least one—the Akun eagle-owl—eats nocturnal cockroaches, no modern owls have been recorded eating iridescent cockroaches. Most modern cockroaches are nocturnal, though iridescent species are more frequently diurnal (active during daytime), suggesting Masillastrix was also diurnal. A diurnal ecology for this early owl is also supported by its robust, proportionately short wings and lack of frayed feathers, since long wings and frayed feathers are adaptations to nocturnal hunting in extant owls.

== Classification ==
Feet of Masillastrix (A–E) compared to other Eocene stem-owls

To test the affinities and relationships of Masillastrix, Mayr et al. (2026) included it in an updated version of the phylogenetic matrix of Mayr & Kitchener (2023). Masillastrix was recovered as part of the owl stem group (member of the Strigiformes outside of the smallest group including all modern owls), in an unresolved clade also including Minerva and Oligostrix. These results are displayed in the cladogram below:

- Strigiformes
  - - †Berruornis orbisantiqui
    - - †Primoptynx poliotauros
      - - †Masillastrix blattophaga
        - †Minerva antiqua
        - †Oligostrix rupelensis
  - †Ogygoptynx wetmorei
  - - †Eostrix tsaganica
    - †Palaeoglaux artophoron
    - †Ypresiglaux gulottai
    - †Ypresiglaux michaeldanielsi
    - Owl crown group
      ⊞
      - Tyto alba (barn owl)
      - Strigidae
        - Surnia ulula (northern hawk-owl)
        - - Ninox novaeseelandiae (morepork)
          - Strix aluco (tawny owl)
      ⊟
