= 2022 in archosaur paleontology =

This article records new taxa of fossil archosaurs of every kind described during the year 2022, as well as other significant discoveries and events related to paleontology of archosaurs that occurred in 2022.

== Pseudosuchians ==
=== New pseudosuchian taxa ===
Name	Novelty	Status	Authors	Age	Type locality	Country	Notes	Images
Confractosuchus	Gen. et sp. nov	Valid	White et al.	Late Cretaceous (Cenomanian)	Winton Formation	Australia	A eusuchian. The type species is C. sauroktonos.	
Diplocynodon kochi	Sp. nov	Valid	Venczel & Codrea	Eocene (Priabonian)	Cluj Limestone Formation	Romania		
Eptalofosuchus	Gen. et sp. nov	Valid	Marinho et al.	Late Cretaceous	Uberaba Formation	Brazil	A notosuchian crocodylomorph. The type species is E. viridi. Announced in 2021; the final article version was published in 2022.	
Eurycephalosuchus	Gen. et sp. nov		Wu et al.	Late Cretaceous	Hekou Formation	China	A member of Alligatoroidea belonging to the group Orientalosuchina. The type species is E. gannanensis.	
Hanyusuchus	Gen. et sp. nov		Iijima et al.	Holocene		China	A member of the family Gavialidae with a mosaic of gavialine and tomistomine features across the skeleton. The type species is H. sinensis.	
Kinyang	Gen. et spp. nov	Valid	Brochu et al.	Early - Middle Miocene	Maboko Formation Lokone Formation	Kenya	A broad skulled genus of osteolaemine crocodile. Type species is K. mabokoensis, also includes new species K. tchernovi.	
Mambawakale	Gen. et sp. nov	Valid	Butler et al.	Middle Triassic	Manda Beds	Tanzania	An early diverging pseudosuchian of uncertain affinities. The type species is M. ruhuhu.	Mambawakale
Maomingosuchus acutirostris	Sp. nov	Valid	Massonne et al.	Eocene (late Bartonian–Priabonian)	Na Duong Formation	Vietnam		
Qianshanosuchus	Gen. et sp. nov	Valid	Boerman et al.	Early Paleocene	Qianshan Basin	China	Probably a basal member of Crocodyloidea. Genus includes new species Q. youngi.	
Sacacosuchus	Gen. et sp. nov		Salas-Gismondi et al.	Late Miocene	Pisco Formation	Peru	A member of the family Gavialidae. The type species is S. cordovai.	
Scolotosuchus	Gen. et sp. nov	Valid	Sennikov	Early Triassic		Russia (Volgograd Oblast)	A member of the family Rauisuchidae. The type species is S. basileus. Published online in 2023, but the issue date is listed as December 2022.	
Titanochampsa	Gen. et sp. nov	Valid	Fachini et al.	Late Cretaceous	Marília Formation	Brazil	A crocodyliform with possible neosuchian affinities. Genus includes new species T. iorii.	
Yanjisuchus	Gen. et sp. nov	Valid	Rummy et al.	Cretaceous (Albian–Cenomanian)	Longjing Formation	China	A paralligatorid crocodyliform. The type species is Y. longshanensis. Announced in 2021; the final article version was published in 2022.	

=== General pseudosuchian research ===
- A study on the mandible embryogenesis in extant caimans, and on its implications for the knowledge of the evolution of postdentary lower jaw of pseudosuchians, is published by Bona et al. (2022).
- A study on the musculature of crocodylian and fossil suchian jaws, investigating the impact of the flattening of the skulls of suchians in their evolutionary history on their muscle anatomy, is published by Sellers et al. (2022).
- Revision of Tsylmosuchus donensis and Scythosuchus basileus is published by Sennikov (2022), who interprets the latter taxon as a junior synonym of the former one, and interprets T. donensis as a likely member of the family Ctenosauriscidae.
- Partial maxilla of a basal loricatan is described from the Upper Triassic (Carnian) lower Candelária Sequence of the Hyperodapedon Assemblage Zone (Brazil) by Damke et al. (2022), expanding known record of loricatans in this unit.
- A study aiming to model to the likely gait of Batrachotomus kupferzellensis is published by Polet & Hutchinson (2022).
- A study on the feeding ecology of Batrachotomus kupferzellensis is published by Mujal et al. (2022).

=== Aetosaur research ===
- A study on the microstructure of the humerus, femur and tibia of Aetosauroides scagliai, and on its implications for the knowledge of the paleobiology of this aetosaur, is published by Ponce, Desojo & Cerda (2022).
- Description of the anatomy of bones belonging to pelvic girdles of members of the genus Stagonolepis from the Upper Triassic of Krasiejów (Poland) is published by Desmet, Antczak & Bodzioch (2022).

=== Crocodylomorph research ===
- A study on the macroscopic structure of osteoderms of extant and extinct crocodylomorphs, including the first description of osteoderms of Iberosuchus, is published by Pochat-Cottilloux et al. (2022), who interpret their findings as indicative of deeper osteoderm implantation within the dermis in Iberosuchus than in other studied taxa, as well as indicative of the loss of ornamentation of osteoderms in derived notosuchians, which might be linked to their terrestrial lifestyle and specific thermoregulation strategy.
- A study on the evolution of palatal anatomy in early crocodylomorphs is published by Dollman & Choiniere (2022).
- An ilium of an early diverging crocodylomorph is described from the Upper Triassic Otis Chalk assemblage (Colorado City Formation, Dockum Group; Texas, United States) by To, Nesbitt, Stocker (2022), expanding the knowledge of the distribution of early crocodylomorphs during the Late Triassic.
- Description of the anatomy of the holotype specimen of Junggarsuchus sloani, its comparison to Dibothrosuchus elaphros, and a study on the affinities of both taxa is published by Ruebenstahl et al. (2022).
- Review of the type material of the crocodylomorph ichnotaxon Crocodylopodus meijidei from the Berriasian of Spain, and a study on the locomotion of the trackmaker, is published by Castanera et al. (2022).
- A study on the bone histology and growth patterns of Neuquensuchus universitas, Notosuchus terrestris, Mariliasuchus amarali and Adamantinasuchus navae is published by Marsà et al. (2022).
- A study on the thermal physiology of notosuchians is published by Cubo et al. (2022), who interpret their findings as indicating that Araripesuchus wegeneri, Armadillosuchus arrudai, Baurusuchus, Iberosuchus macrodon and Stratiotosuchus maxhechti were ectothermic.
- A study on the osteoderm histology of Cretaceous notosuchians from Brazil is published by Sena et al. (2022), who report evidence of Sharpey's fibres in Armadillosuchus arrudai, Itasuchus jesuinoi and baurusuchids interpreted as indicative of the presence of thick leathery layer of skin overlying osteoderms, and report the presence of the vascular canals in some sampled osteoderms which might have increased the capacity of heat transfer.
- Description of the microstructure of the tooth and tooth attachment tissues of Notosuchus terrestris is published by Navarro et al. (2022), who find the relative and absolute enamel thickness of N. terrestris to be similar to those reported for carnivorous notosuchians such as baurusuchids, and interpret their findings as indicating that the tooth growth rates of N. terrestris were reduced in comparison with other notosuchians.
- A study on the bone histology of Mariliasuchus amarali, based on a new specimen is published by Sena et al. (2022).
- A study on the palatal anatomy of Sebecus icaeorhinus and its implications for the knowledge of the variability in the palatal anatomy within Sebecidae, is published by Bravo et al. (2022).
- A study on the phylogenetic relationships of neosuchians and on timing of the origination of key clades in neosuchian evolution is published by Groh et al. (2022).
- A nearly complete premaxilla of a member of the genus Elosuchus, about 40% larger than the largest premaxilla of members of this genus known so far, is described by Parra & Sellés (2022), who interpret this finding as indicating that Elosuchus achieved remarkable body size proportions.
- A study on the evolution of salt glands in thalattosuchians is published by Cowgill et al. (2022).
- A study on the feeding ecology of teleosauroids, as inferred from the dentition and mandibular characteristics, is published by Johnson et al. (2022), who interpret their findings as indicative of a narrow feeding ecological divide between teleosaurids and machimosaurids.
- Fossil material of an Early Jurassic teleosauroid crocodylomorph is described from the Chaara cave (Morocco) by Hicham et al. (2022), representing the oldest African thalattosuchian reported to date, and indicating that thalattosuchians were widely distributed as soon as the earliest Jurassic.
- Serafini et al. (2022) describe a clustered mass of bones of an aeolodontine teleosaurid from the Upper Jurassic Rosso Ammonitico Veronese Formation (Italy) interpreted as a regurgitalite, representing the first crocodylomorph described in a regurgitalite and expanding known geographic range of aeolodontines.
- Le Mort et al. (2022) describe a specimen of Metriorhynchus (with affinities to M. superciliosus) from the Middle Jurassic (Callovian) of Vaches-Noires cliffs (Normandy, France), report the presence of diagnostic criteria of different metriorhynchids in the skeleton of this specimen, and evaluate the implications of this specimen for the knowledge of the taxonomic value of the criteria used to distinguish between the different Callovian and Oxfordian metriorhynchid species.
- A study on the phylogenetic affinities of Portugalosuchus azenhae is published by Darlim et al. (2022).
- Lindblad et al. (2022) describe specimens of Borealosuchus griffithi and B. sternbergii preserved in proximity to each other within the same deposits of the Paleocene Ravenscrag Formation (Saskatchewan, Canada), expanding known stratigraphic and geographic range of these species, and interpret this finding as possible evidence of niche partitioning or other ecological relationships between the two species.
- Crocodylomorph eggshell fragments, probably representing remains of eggs produced by allodaposuchids, are described from the Maastrichtian of the Southern Pyrenees (Huesca, Spain) by Moreno-Azanza et al. (2022), who name a new ootaxon Pachykrokolithus excavatum.
- Reconstructions of the inner cavities of the holotype skulls of Arenysuchus gascabadiolorum and Agaresuchus subjuniperus are presented by Puértolas-Pascual et al. (2022).
- Kuzmin (2022) reviews all known material of long-snouted crocodyliforms from the Upper Cretaceous (Cenomanian–Santonian) of Central Asia, confirms Zholsuchus procerus to be a valid taxon, and argues that it is likely one of the oldest known members of the crown group of Crocodylia.
- Redescription of the holotype of Notocaiman stromeri, and a study on its taxonomic status and phylogenetic affinities, is published by Bona et al. (2022).
- A study aiming to estimate the body size of large caimanines from the Miocene of South America, including Purussaurus and Mourasuchus, is published by Paiva et al. (2022).
- Pessoa-Lima et al. (2022) compare the morphological features and chemical composition of tooth enamel of Purussaurus and extant black caiman.
- Massonne & Böhme (2022) confirm Diplocynodon levantinicum to be a valid species, and interpret it as Oligocene (Chattian) in age.
- A study on the anatomy of the skull of Trilophosuchus rackhami is published by Ristevski et al. (2022).
- Description of the neuroanatomy of Trilophosuchus rackhami is published by Ristevski (2022).
- Fragmentary mandible of a possible member of the genus Thoracosaurus is described from the lower Maastrichtian of Møns Klint (Denmark) by Voiculescu-Holvad (2022), indicating transatlantic distribution of Gavialoidea dating back to the earliest Maastrichtian.
- The oldest known fossil material of a member of the genus Crocodylus in Madagascar, dated to between 7670 and 7510 years cal BP, is described by Martin et al. (2022).

== Non-avian dinosaurs ==
=== New dinosaur taxa ===
Name	Novelty	Status	Authors	Age	Type locality	Country	Notes	Images
Abditosaurus	Gen. et sp. nov	Valid	Vila et al.	Late Cretaceous (Maastrichtian)	Conques Formation	Spain	A saltasaurine titanosaur. The type species is A. kuehnei.	
Bashanosaurus	Gen. et sp. nov	Valid	Dai et al.	Middle Jurassic (Bajocian)	Shaximiao Formation	China	A basal stegosaur. The type species is B. primitivus.	
Bisticeratops	Gen. et sp. nov	Valid	Dalman et al.	Late Cretaceous (Campanian)	Kirtland Formation	United States (New Mexico)	A chasmosaurine ceratopsid. The type species is B. froeseorum.	
Caieiria	Gen. et sp. nov	Valid	Silva Junior et al.	Late Cretaceous	Serra da Galga Formation	Brazil	A titanosaur sauropod. The type species is C. allocaudata.	
Daspletosaurus wilsoni	Sp. nov	Valid	Warshaw & Fowler	Late Cretaceous (Campanian)	Judith River Formation	United States (Montana)	A tyrannosaurine; a species of Daspletosaurus.	
Daurlong	Gen. et sp. nov	Valid	Wang et al.	Early Cretaceous (Aptian)	Longjiang Formation	China	A dromaeosaurid theropod. The type species is D. wangi.	
Dzharaonyx	Gen. et sp. nov	Valid	Averianov & Sues	Late Cretaceous (Turonian)	Bissekty Formation	Uzbekistan	An alvarezsaurid theropod. The type species is D. eski.	
Elemgasem	Gen. et sp. nov		Baiano et al.	Late Cretaceous (Turonian–Coniacian)	Portezuelo Formation	Argentina	An abelisaurid theropod. The type species is E. nubilus.	
Guemesia	Gen. et sp. nov	Valid	Agnolín et al.	Late Cretaceous (Campanian)	Los Blanquitos Formation	Argentina	An abelisaurid theropod. The type species is G. ochoai.	
Huallasaurus	Gen. et comb. nov	Valid	Rozadilla et al.	Late Cretaceous (Maastrichtian)	Los Alamitos Formation	Argentina	A saurolophine hadrosaurid belonging to the clade Austrokritosauria. The type species is 'Kritosaurus' australis (Bonaparte, 1984).	
Iberospinus	Gen. et sp. nov	Valid	Mateus & Estraviz-López	Early Cretaceous (Barremian)	Papo Seco Formation	Portugal	A spinosaurid theropod. The type species is I. natarioi.	
Ibirania	Gen. et sp. nov	Valid	Navarro et al.	Late Cretaceous (Santonian-Campanian)	São José do Rio Preto Formation	Brazil	A saltasaurine titanosaur. The type species is I. parva.	
Iyuku	Gen. et sp. nov	In press	Forster et al.	Early Cretaceous (Valanginian)	Kirkwood Formation	South Africa	An iguanodontian ornithopod, possibly a dryosaurid. Genus includes new species I. raathi.	
Jakapil	Gen. et sp. nov		Riguetti, Apesteguía & Pereda-Suberbiola	Late Cretaceous (Cenomanian)	Candeleros Formation	Argentina	A thyreophoran, probably a basal member of this group. The type species is J. kaniukura.	
Kelumapusaura	Gen. et sp. nov	Valid	Rozadilla et al.	Late Cretaceous (Campanian-Maastrichtian)	Allen Formation	Argentina	A saurolophine hadrosaurid belonging to the clade Austrokritosauria. The type species is K. machi.	
Maip	Gen. et sp. nov	Valid	Aranciaga Rolando et al.	Late Cretaceous (Maastrichtian)	Chorrillo Formation	Argentina	A megaraptorid theropod. The type species is M. macrothorax.	
Malefica	Gen. et sp. nov		Prieto-Márquez & Wagner	Late Cretaceous (Campanian)	Aguja Formation	United States (Texas)	A basally-branching hadrosaurid. Genus includes new species M. deckerti. Announced in 2022; the final article version will be published in 2023.	
Mbiresaurus	Gen. et sp. nov	Valid	Griffin et al.	Late Triassic (Carnian)	Pebbly Arkose Formation	Zimbabwe	An early member of Sauropodomorpha. Genus includes new species M. raathi.	
Menucocelsior	Gen. et sp. nov	Valid	Rolando et al.	Late Cretaceous (Campanian-Maastrichtian)	Allen Formation	Argentina	A titanosaur sauropod. The type species is M. arriagadai. Announced in 2021; the final article version was published in 2022.	
Meraxes	Gen. et sp. nov	Valid	Canale et al.	Late Cretaceous (Cenomanian-Turonian)	Huincul Formation	Argentina	A carcharodontosaurid theropod. The type species is M. gigas.	
Napaisaurus	Gen. et sp. nov	Valid	Ji & Zhang	Early Cretaceous	Xinlong Formation	China	A basal member of Iguanodontia. The type species is N. guangxiensis. Announced in 2021; the final article version was published in 2022.	
Natovenator	Gen. et sp. nov		Lee et al.	Late Cretaceous (Campanian)	Barun Goyot Formation	Mongolia	A halszkaraptorine theropod. The type species is N. polydontus.	
Nevadadromeus	Gen. et sp. nov	Valid	Bonde et al.	Late Cretaceous (Cenomanian)	Willow Tank Formation	United States (Nevada)	An ornithischian, potentially a member of Thescelosauridae. The type species is N. schmitti.	
Ondogurvel	Gen. et sp. nov	Valid	Averianov & Lopatin	Late Cretaceous (Campanian)	Barun Goyot Formation	Mongolia	An alvarezsaurid theropod. The type species is O. alifanovi.	
Papiliovenator	Gen. et sp. nov	Valid	Pei et al.	Late Cretaceous (Campanian)	Bayan Mandahu Formation	China	A troodontid theropod. The type species is P. neimengguensis. Announced in 2021; the final article version to be published in 2022.	
Paralitherizinosaurus	Gen. et sp. nov	Valid	Kobayashi et al.	Late Cretaceous (Campanian)	Osoushinai Formation	Japan	A therizinosaurid theropod. The type species is P. japonicus.	
Patagopelta	Gen. et sp. nov	Valid	Riguetti et al.	Late Cretaceous (Upper Campanian–lower Maastrichtian)	Allen Formation	Argentina	A parankylosaurian ankylosaur. The type species is P. cristata.	
Perijasaurus	Gen. et sp. nov		Rincón et al.	Jurassic (Toarcian–Aalenian)	La Quinta Formation	Colombia	An early member of Eusauropoda. The type species is P. lapaz.	
Ruixinia	Gen. et sp. nov	In press	Mo et al.	Early Cretaceous (Barremian)	Yixian Formation	China	A somphospondylan titanosauriform. The type species is R. zhangi.	
Sierraceratops	Gen. et sp. nov	Valid	Dalman et al.	Late Cretaceous (latest Campanian–Maastrichtian)	Hall Lake Formation	United States (New Mexico)	A chasmosaurine ceratopsid. The type species is S. turneri. Announced in 2021; the final article version will be published in 2022.	Sierraceratops
Transylvanosaurus	Gen. et sp. nov		Augustin et al.	Late Cretaceous (Maastrichtian)		Romania	A rhabdodontid ornithopod. The type species is T. platycephalus.	
Tuebingosaurus	Gen. et sp. nov	Valid	Regalado Fernandez & Werneburg	Late Triassic	Trossingen Formation	Germany	A sauropodomorph dinosaur, an early member of Massopoda. The type species is T. maierfritzorum.	
Tyrannosaurus imperator	Sp. nov	Disputed	Paul, Persons & Van Raalte	Late Cretaceous (late Maastrichtian)	Hell Creek, Lance, Laramie, Arapahoe, McRae?, North Horn?, and Javelina? Formations	United States (Montana, North Dakota, South Dakota, Wyoming, New Mexico?, Texas?, Utah?)	A tyrannosaurine; a proposed species of Tyrannosaurus. Carr et al. (2022) considered the evidence presented by Paul, Persons & Van Raalte (2022) to be insufficient to support the recognition of T. imperator as a species distinct from Tyrannosaurus rex.	FMNH PR 2081 ("Sue"), the holotype of T. imperator
Tyrannosaurus regina	Sp. nov	Disputed	Paul, Persons & Van Raalte	Late Cretaceous (late Maastrichtian)	Hell Creek, Lance, Ferris, Denver, Frenchman, Willow Creek, and Scollard Formations	Canada (Alberta, Saskatchewan); United States (Colorado, Montana, North Dakota, South Dakota, Wyoming)	A tyrannosaurine; a proposed species of Tyrannosaurus. Carr et al. (2022) considered the evidence presented by Paul, Persons & Van Raalte (2022) to be insufficient to support the recognition of T. regina as a species distinct from Tyrannosaurus rex.	MOR 555 ("Wankel rex"), the holotype of T. regina
Yuxisaurus	Gen. et sp. nov	Valid	Yao et al.	Early Jurassic (Sinemurian–Toarcian)	Fengjiahe Formation	China	An early thyreophoran. The type species is Y. kopchicki.	
Yuzhoulong	Gen. et sp. nov	Valid	Dai et al.	Middle Jurassic (probably Bathonian)	Shaximiao Formation	China	An early diverging macronarian sauropod. The type species is Y. qurenensis.	

=== General non-avian dinosaur research ===
- Wilmsen, Fürsich, and Majidifard (2022) describe a fossil trackway from the Maastrichtian Farrokhi Formation (central Iran) made by indeterminate dinosaurs, which represents the youngest evidence of dinosaur locomotion from the Middle East.
- A study on the diversity of form and function of teeth in early-diverging dinosaurs is published by Ballell, Benton & Rayfield (2022), providing evidence of a previously unrecognized functional diversity in the dentitions of early dinosaurs, and indicating that either carnivory or omnivory was the ancestral diet of dinosaurs, with obligate herbivory interpreted as a late evolutionary innovation in both Sauropodomorpha and Ornithischia.
- Olsen et al. (2022) present evidence from the Late Triassic and Early Jurassic strata of the Junggar Basin (northwest China) indicating that during the early Mesozoic dinosaurs were present at arctic latitudes with freezing winter temperatures, and argue that non-avian dinosaurs were likely primitively insulated and that their insulation enabled them to survive in cold temperatures, take advantage of the rich plant resources in the colder high latitudes, and live through episodes of volcanically induced winters during the Triassic–Jurassic extinction event.
- A study on the impact Early Jurassic Jenkyns Event, affecting terrestrial environments with global warming, perturbation of the carbon cycle, enhanced weathering and wildfires, on terrestrial ecosystems, including dinosaur assemblages, is published by Reolid, Ruebsam & Benton (2022); the same authors subsequently review the fossil record of Early Jurassic dinosaurs, and confirm that the Jenkyns Event was an important biotic crisis affecting dinosaurs.
- A study on the ecomorphospace occupation of major megaherbivorous dinosaur clades from the Late Jurassic through to the end of the Late Cretaceous in North America is published by Wyenberg-Henzler (2022).
- A study on the age of a new sauropod-dominated dinosaur fauna from the Lower Shaximiao Formation in Yunyang (Chongqing, China) is published by Zhou et al. (2022).
- Description of theropod and ornithischian tracks from the Jurassic Imilchil and Isli formations (Morocco), including theropod tracks representing the ichnogenus Changpeipus (otherwise known from abundant occurrences in East Asia, and possibly indicative of faunal exchange between East Asia and northern Africa in the Middle Jurassic), is published by Klein et al. (2022).
- Revision of the Early Cretaceous dinosaur assemblage from the Mogoito locality (Murtoi Formation, Transbaikalia, Russia) is published by Averianov et al. (2022), who report the presence of Tengrisaurus starkovi, as well as ornithomimosaur, therizinosaur, dromaeosaurid, jeholosaurid (including teeth previously attributed to Psittacosaurus) and indeterminate sauropod and theropod fossil material.
- New fossil site for the Jehol Biota, preserving faunal assemblage dominated by dinosaur fossils and similar in composition to the Lujiatun Unit of the Yixian Formation at Beipiao (Liaoning, China), is reported from Ningcheng (Inner Mongolia, China) by Zhang et al. (2022).
- Nudds, Lomax & Tennant (2022) confirm the identification of teeth of Deinonychus antirrhopus and gastroliths associated with a well-preserved specimen of Tenontosaurus tilletti (MANCH LL.12275) from the Lower Cretaceous Cloverly Formation (Montana, United States).
- Two trackways produced by at least two different dinosaur taxa (smaller, bipedal trackmaker, likely a theropod, and a larger trackmaker of uncertain affinities, possibly a theropod or ornithopod), representing the first records of non-avian dinosaurs from Palestine reported to date, are described from a new site located within the city of Al-Bireh and belonging to the Albian Soreq Formation by Lallensack et al. (2022).
- Fragment of long bone of a dinosaur is described from the Upper Cretaceous (Santonian–Campanian) sediments near the village of Izhberda (Orenburg Oblast, Russia) by Skutschas et al. (2022), who interpret the histological features of this bone as indicative of rapid continuous growth known in large-sized dinosaurs, and interpret this finding as indicative of presence of large dinosaurs in the Southern Urals, which were not subjected to the "island effect" in spite of living on islands or on the continental margin.
- A set of geochronologic data from the Campanian geological formations of North America's Western Interior Basin is presented by Ramezani et al. (2022), who consider their findings to be indicative of significant age overlap between the main fossil-bearing intervals of the Kaiparowits, Judith River, Two Medicine and Dinosaur Park formations, and interpret their findings as refuting inferences that the proposed latitudinal provinciality of the Campanian dinosaur taxa is only an artefact of age misinterpretation.
- A large dinosaur tracksite preserving theropod tracks and abundant hadrosaurid tracks is described from the Upper Cretaceous (Campanian) Wapiti Formation (Alberta, Canada) by Enriquez et al. (2022), who evaluate the implications of this finding for the knowledge of the paleoecology of dinosaurs known from the Wapiti Formation.
- A study on the calcium isotope variability in tooth enamel of dinosaurs from the Upper Cretaceous Dinosaur Park Formation, Horseshoe Canyon Formation and Scollard Formation (Alberta, Canada), and on its implications for the knowledge of the stability of food web structure of non-avian dinosaur communities in the millions of years preceding the end of the Cretaceous, is published by Martin et al. (2022).
- Tracks of probable hatchling tyrannosaurids, medium and large ornithomimids, small and medium-sized ornithopods and a small hadrosaurid, some of which might document gregarious behaviour, are described from the Campanian–Maastrichtian St. Mary River Formation (Alberta, Canada) by Henderson et al. (2022).
- A study on the stable isotope compositions of dinosaur eggshells (Umbellaoolithus and Similifaveoloolithus) and their associated depositional settings of the Upper Cretaceous Huizhou Formation (China), and on their implications for the knowledge of the environment of dinosaur nesting sites, is published by He et al. (2022).
- He et al. (2022) describe a new species of the stalicoolithid oogenus Shixingoolithus, S. qianshanensis, as the first dinosaurian record from the Upper Cretaceous Qianshan Basin (Chishan Formation) of Anhui Province, China.
- Han et al. (2022) establish a high-resolution geochronological framework for the fossil-rich Late Cretaceous sedimentary sequence in the Shanyang Basin (China), and interpret the fossil material from the studied specimens as indicative of sustained low dinosaur biodiversity in the studied area between ~68.2 and ~66.4 million years ago, and of a decline in dinosaur biodiversity from the Campanian to the Maastrichtian.
- Review of chemistry of the organic molecules detected in non-avian dinosaur fossils to date is published by Tahoun et al. (2022).
- A study on the phylogenetic affinities of Chilesaurus diegosuarezi is published by Baron (2022).

=== Saurischian research ===
- A study on the axial skeletons of Buriolestes schultzi, Pampadromaeus barberenai and Gnathovorax cabreirai is published by Aureliano et al. (2022), who find no unambiguous evidence of postcranial pneumaticity in the studied taxa, and argue that an air sacs system permeating the skeletons was not present in the earliest dinosaurs, and evolved independently in theropods, sauropodomorphs and pterosaurs.

==== Theropod research ====
- Review of the morphology and distribution of non-feather integumentary structures in non-avialan theropods is published by Hendrickx et al. (2022).
- A study on the abundance of large theropods from the Upper Jurassic Morrison Formation and Upper Cretaceous Dinosaur Park Formation in terms of population density and relative to the abundance of the megaherbivorous dinosaurs is published by Farlow et al. (2022), who interpret their findings as indicating that large theropods may have been more abundant on the landscape than inferred from extrapolations from the relationship between population density and body size in modern mammalian predators.
- Description of a small high-density assemblage of theropod tracks from the Cretaceous Haman Formation (South Korea), and a study on the distribution of grallatorid tracks in east Asia, is published by Lockley et al. (2022).
- Trackway produced by a large theropod, probably affected by a foot pathology, is described from the upper Barremian locality of Las Hoyas (La Huérguina Formation, Spain) by Herrera-Castillo et al. (2022).
- Revision of the fossil material of theropods from the Middle to Late Jurassic of the Vaches Noires cliffs (Normandy, France) is published by Monvoisin et al. (2022).
- An isolated theropod tooth, possibly belonging to a member of Allosauroidea, Tyrannosauroidea and/or Megaraptora, is reported from the Hauterivian–Barremian Itsuki Formation (Japan) by Ueda et al. (2022).
- Revision of theropod teeth from the Campanian site of Laño (Spain), evaluating their implications for the knowledge of diversity and evolutionary history of theropods from the Late Cretaceous of Europe, is published by Isasmendi et al. (2022).
- Davis et al. (2022) describe fossil material of theropods (both non-avian and avian) from the Upper Cretaceous (Campanian-Maastrichtian) deposits from a high paleolatitude (>60° S) Río de las Chinas Valley site (Magallanes-Austral Basin, Chile), representing the first record of theropods from Chilean Patagonia, and including the southernmost (outside of Antarctica) known occurrences of theropod clades such as megaraptorids, unenlagiines, enantiornithines and ornithurines.
- A study aiming to determine the causes of the shortening of the forelimbs of giant theropods, especially tyrannosaurids, is published by Padian (2022).
- A study on the bone histology and life history of specimens of Coelophysis bauri from the bonebed from Ghost Ranch (New Mexico, United States) is published by Barta, Griffin & Norell (2022), who interpret their findings as indicative of a high degree of variation in growth trajectories among specimens belonging to this species.
- Caudal vertebra of a theropod is described from the Aliança Formation (Brazil) by De Oliveira, Oliveira & Fambrini (2022), who consider the studied specimen to be a basal neotheropod, and interpret this finding as likely evidence of the survival of basal neotheropods into the Middle-Late Jurassic in Gondwana.
- The first definitive fossil (a vertebra) of an abelisaurid from the Upper Cretaceous Bahariya Formation (Egypt) is described by Salem et al. (2022).
- A small abelisaurid caudal vertebra is described from the Upper Cretaceous Presidente Prudente Formation (Brazil) by Delcourt & Langer (2022), who interpret this vertebra as belonging to an adult animal, representing one of the smallest known abelisaurids.
- Description of the anatomy of the appendicular skeleton of Skorpiovenator bustingorryi is published by Cerroni et al. (2022).
- Gianechini et al. (2022) describe an isolated caudal vertebra of an abelisaurid theropod from the Santonian Bajo de la Carpa Formation (Argentina), with anatomy indicative of affinities with older, Cenomanian and Turonian non-furileusaurian taxa, and indicating that the turnover of abelisaurid forms, with furileusaurias replacing basal brachyrostrans, occurred after the Turonian.
- A study on the bone histology of the type specimen of Aucasaurus garridoi is published by Baiano & Cerda (2022).
- An analysis of the possible aquatic habits of members of Spinosauridae, as well as other non-avian dinosaurs, is published by Fabbri et al. (2022), who determine that a high bone density would have allowed for underwater foraging in Spinosaurus and Baryonyx, while Suchomimus was likely better suited for terrestrial wading, despite morphological similarities to Baryonyx.
- Isasmendi et al. (2022) reinterpret a fragment of a maxilla from the Lower Cretaceous of La Rioja (Spain), previously assigned to Baryonyx, as likely belonging to an indeterminate baryonychine closer to Baryonyx than to Suchomimus.
- Postcranial material of a giant spinosaurid, which was likely one of the largest European theropods reported to date, is described from the Lower Cretaceous Vectis Formation (United Kingdom) by Barker et al. (2022).
- Sereno et al. (2022) interpret the anatomy of the skeleton of Spinosaurus aegyptiacus as indicating that this theropod was incapable of diving and unstable in deeper water, report the discovery of fossils of members of the genus Spinosaurus in the Cenomanian Echkar Formation (Niger) buried in fluvial overbank deposits far from a marine coastline, and interpret Spinosaurus as a semiaquatic shoreline ambush predator.
- A study comparing dental microwear texture of Allosaurus and tyrannosaurid theropods is published by Winkler et al. (2022), who confirm that younger theropods occupied different dietary niches to adult individuals, but don't find evidence indicating that tyrannosaurids consumed bones more frequently than Allosaurus.
- Paterna & Cau (2022) describe new carcharodontosaurid cranial material from the Kem Kem Group (Morocco), including one partial maxilla with a morphology distinct from that of Carcharodontosaurus saharicus, with a body size as comparable to the largest carcharodontosaurids, argue that Sauroniops pachytholus is distinct from Carcharodontosaurus, and interpret their findings as supporting the presence of more than one giant carcharodontosaurid species in the Cenomanian of Morocco.
- A detailed description, comparison, and analysis of the tyrannosauroid Eotyrannus from the Wessex Formation is published by Naish & Cau (2022).
- Redescription of the first theropod tooth discovered in Australia (probably from the Griman Creek Formation) is published by Kotevski and Poropat (2022), who interpret the tooth as belonging to a member of Megaraptoridae.
- Description of five theropod teeth assignable to three different families (Troodontidae, Dromaeosauridae, and Tyrannosauridae) from the Early Campanian Nenjiang Formation (China) is published by Yu et al. (2022)
- New theropod teeth, identified as teeth of dromaeosaurids and non-tyrannosaurid tyrannosauroids, are described from the Barremian site of Vadillos-1 (Cuenca Province, Spain) by Berrocal-Casero et al. (2022).
- Partial tyrannosauroid femur, morphologically similar to the femur of Moros intrepidus but not referable to this taxon, is described from the Albian–Cenomanian Wayan Formation (Idaho, United States) by Krumenacker, Zanno & Sues (2022), who interpret this finding as evidence of the presence of a previously unrecognized tyrannosauroid in the early Late Cretaceous of Laramidia.
- Evidence from the skeleton of Gorgosaurus libratus, interpreted as indicating that the specialized arctometatarsus of tyrannosaurid theropods was strengthened by distinctive and specific ligaments unknown in other theropods, is presented by Surring et al. (2022).
- Two juvenile specimens of Gorgosaurus libratus, providing new information on the anatomy and ontogeny of this taxon and tyrannosaurids in general, are described from the Late Cretaceous Dinosaur Park Formation (Alberta, Canada) by Voris et al. (2022).
- Description of the frontal anatomy of Teratophoneus curriei is published by Yun (2022).
- A study on the anatomy of the skull of Qianzhousaurus sinensis is published by Foster et al. (2022).
- Kim et al. (2022) compare a fish centrum found with the holotype of Raptorex kriegsteini with Harenaichthys lui from the Nemegt Formation (Mongolia) and Chinese Xixiaichthys tongxinensis, and interpret their findings as supporting the conclusion that the holotype of R. kriegsteini comes from the Nemegt Formation.
- A study on growth changes in the frontal bones of Tarbosaurus bataar is published by Yun, Peters & Currie (2022).
- Description of the neurovascular canals in rostral cranial elements of Tyrannosaurus rex, and a study on the evolution of these canals among Sauropsida and on the possibility of the presence of lips and specialised sensory organs among non-avian theropods, is published by Bouabdellah, Lessner & Benoit (2022).
- A study refuting the claim that infection caused madibular pathologies in Tyrannosaurus is published by Rothschild, O'Connor, and Lozado (2022), who interpret the pathologies as instead being caused by intraspecific interactions.
- Tsogtbaatar et al. (2022) describe fossils of two members of Ornithomimosauria of different body sizes from the Santonian Eutaw Formation (Mississippi, United States), including fossil material of one of the largest members of Ornithomimosaurian known worldwide.
- An ornithomimosaurian pelvis and sacrum is described from the Upper Cretaceous Erlian Formation (China) by Xi et al. (2022), who interpret this fossil material as likely belonging to a member of Ornithomimosauria distinct from Archaeornithomimus asiaticus, probably representing an early-diverging group within Ornithomimosauria.
- A pathologic metatarsal of a large-bodied ornithomimid, likely affected by traumatic impact fracture with subsequent chronic osteomyelitis, is described from the Santonian (Eutaw Formation) (Mississippi, United States) by Chinzorig et al. (2022), who evaluate the implications of the studied specimen for the knowledge of the criteria which can be used to properly distinguish between medullary bone and pathological endosteal bone in archosaur fossils.
- The first diagnostic ornithomimid fossils from the upper Maastrichtian Scollard Formation (Alberta, Canada) are described by Nottrodt (2022), extending the stratigraphic ranges of both Ornithomimus and Struthiomimus in Alberta from the upper Campanian Dinosaur Park Formation through to the Scollard Formation, which constitutes more than 10 million years of time.
- A study on the forelimbs of the Alvarezsauroidea using evolutionary teratology is published by Guinard (2022).
- Redescription of Parvicursor remotus is published by Averianov & Lopatin (2022), who reinterpret the holotype of this genus as a juvenile and consider Linhenykus monodactylus and Ceratonykus oculatus to be synonymous with it.
- A study on the jaw adductor musculature and bite force of members of Oviraptorosauria is published by Meade & Ma (2022).
- Review of the knowledge of the reproductive biology of the Late Cretaceous oviraptorosaurs is published by Yang & Sander (2022).
- A study aiming to determine how the developmental stage of well-preserved oviraptorosaur embryos can be estimated is published by Deeming & Kundrát (2022), who argue that known articulated oviraptorosaur embryos, including the oviraptorid specimen from the Hekou Formation (China) described by Xing et al. (2021), were not close to hatching.
- Averianov & Lopatin (2022) report the discovery of fossil material of a member of the genus Avimimus from the Santonian Ialovachsk Formation (Tajikistan), representing the first record of an avimimid oviraptorosaur from Central Asia reported to date.
- A subadult oviraptorid specimen interpreted as the first non-hatchling specimen of Yulong mini reported to date is described from the Upper Cretaceous Qiupa Formation (China) by Wei et al. (2022).
- Serrano-Brañas et al. (2022) describe the first caenagnathid material from the Upper Cretaceous Cerro del Pueblo Formation (Mexico), representing the southernmost Laramidian record of caenagnathids reported to date.
- A study on the evolution of the skull morphology of non-avialan paravian theropods is published by Pei & Xu (2022).
- A dromaeosaurid-like sickle claw, similar in some ways to Pyroraptor olympius, is reported from the Grès à Reptiles Formation (France) by Brilhante et al. (2022).
- Sues, Averianov & Britt (2022) describe a pedal phalanx of a dromaeosaurid theropod from the Turonian Bissekty Formation (Uzbekistan), and estimate that the studied dromaeosaurid attained a larger body size than any previously known member of that clade.
- Hone et al. (2022) report the presence of the remains of a small fossil mammal foot inside the body cavity of the holotype of Microraptor zhaoianus, indicating that the diet of this theropod included mammals.
- A study on the phylogenetic relationships of members of Eudromaeosauria is published by Powers et al. (2022), who interpret Acheroraptor temertyorum and Atrociraptor marshalli as members of the Saurornitholestinae.
- A study on the skeletal anatomy and affinities of Dineobellator notohesperus is published by Jasinski et al (2022).
- Letizio, Bertini, & Medeiros (2022) describe unenlagiine teeth from a tooth assemblage in the Late Cretaceous (Albian–Cenomanian) Alcântara Formation (São Luís-Grajaú Basin), of Maranhão, Brazil, and determine that Unenlagiinae had a wider chronological and geographical distribution than was previously thought.
- Yu et al. (2022) describe a troodontid tooth from the Upper Cretaceous Yuliangze Formation (Heilongjiang, China), expanding known geographic range of the Troodon tooth morphotype.
- New theropod assemblage, including the first records of a large carcharodontosaur allosauroid and of a troodontid maniraptoran in Appalachia reported to date, as well as the earliest occurrence of a tyrannosauroid in Appalachia reported to date, is described from the Cenomanian Lewisville Formation (Woodbine Group; Texas, United States) by Noto et al. (2022).

==== Sauropodomorph research ====
- A study on the shape variation of long bones in limbs of sauropodomorphs, and on its implications for the knowledge of the evolution of the sauropod bauplan, is published by Lefebvre et al. (2022).
- Review of the biological mechanisms underpinning the evolutionary transition from obligatory or facultative bipedalism to an obligatory quadrupedalism in sauropodomorphs is published by Otero & Hutchinson (2022).
- A study on the impact of climate on distribution of sauropodomorphs during their early evolutionary history is published by Dunne et al. (2022), who find that Late Triassic sauropodomorphs occupied a more restricted climatic niche space than other tetrapods (including other dinosaurs), being excluded from the hottest, low-latitude climate zones, that the expansion of sauropodomorph geographic distribution during the Early Jurassic was facilitated by climatic change and the expansion of their preferred, cooler climatic conditions, and that later in the Early Jurassic, close to the radiation of Sauropoda, they shifted to a warmer climatic niche.
- Revision and a study on the phylogenetic affinities of Carnian sauropodomorphs from South America is published by Langer et al. (2022).
- A study on the shape and variation of the anterolateral scar in the femora of Pampadromaeus barberenai and Buriolestes schultzi, and on its implications for the knowledge of the distribution of the anterolateral scar in ornithodirans, is published by Müller (2022).
- An approximately 228-million-years-old series of five cervical vertebrae of a sauropodomorph dinosaur is reported from Brazil by Damke et al. (2022), who report that the vertebrae of the studied specimen are proportionately longer than that of older forms and shorter than that of younger ones, and interpret this specimen as indicating that the elongation of the neck of sauropodomorphs was a gradual evolutionary process.
- A study on the taphonomy of the sauropodomorph fauna from the Late Triassic Los Colorados Formation (Argentina) is published by Pérez et al. (2022).
- Reconstruction of the appendicular musculature of Thecodontosaurus antiquus is presented by Ballell, Rayfield & Benton (2022).
- A new, large sized early sauropodomorph specimen is described from the Late Triassic (Carnian) Santa Maria Formation (Brazil) by Müller and Garcia (2022)
- Jannel, Salisbury & Panagiotopoulou (2022) present evidence from the study of Plateosaurus engelhardti, Rhoetosaurus brownei, Camarasaurus, Giraffatitan brancai and Diplodocus carnegii indicating that the studied sauropodomorphs would have been unable to support their weight without a soft tissue pad in the pes, and interpret their findings as indicative of the appearance of pedal soft tissue pad early in the course of the evolution of sauropod dinosaurs.
- A study on the histology of long bones of Massospondylus carinatus from multiple anatomical regions, ranging in size from embryo to adult, is published by Chapelle et al. (2022), who interpret their findings as indicative of substantial variations in growth history, and as providing no evidence for differential growth rates in forelimb and hindlimb samples from the same individual, thus refuting hypothesised ontogenetic postural shifts in Massospondylus.
- Revision of the non-gravisaurian sauropodiform taxa from South America (Mussaurus patagonicus, Leonerasaurus taquetrensis, Lessemsaurus sauropoides and Ingentia prima) is published by Apaldetti & Martínez (2022).
- A study on changes occurring in the postcranial skeleton of Mussaurus patagonicus during its ontogeny is published by Otero & Pol (2022).
- A study on the bone histology and life history of Mussaurus patagonicus is published by Cerda et al. (2022).
- A study on the bone histology of Aardonyx celestae and Sefapanosaurus zatronensis is published by Botha, Choiniere & Benson (2022), who interpret their findings as indicative of rapid but seasonally interrupted growth, and indicating that highly accelerated growth rates first evolved among non-sauropod sauropodomorphs weighing 1 to 2 tons, preceding the appearance of giant sauropods.
- Evidence of widespread incompleteness of necks even in best-preserved and best-known sauropod specimens, and of widespread distortion of known sauropod cervical vertebrae, is presented by Taylor (2022).
- A study aiming to determine whether the sauropod tracks from the Kimmeridgian Courtedoux-Tchâfouè track site (Reuchenette Formation, Switzerland) all represent the same ichnogenus and whether there is variation in their morphology, using linear-based and geometric morphometrics methods, is published by Sciscio et al. (2022).
- A sample of sauropod caudal vertebrae is described from the Maastrichtian of Romania by Mocho, Pérez-García & Codrea (2022), expanding the knowledge of the diversity of the sauropods of the Hațeg Island during the Maastrichtian, and potentially providing evidence of four different tail morphologies which might belong to four sauropod taxa.
- Redescription of the anatomy of the dorsal vertebrae of Xinjiangtitan shanshanesis is published by Zhang et al. (2022).
- Fragmentary heart-shaped tooth crown of a sauropod is described from the Bathonian Jaisalmer Formation (India) by Sharma, Singh & Satheesh (2022), who interpret this specimen as the first known record of a member of Turiasauria from India.
- A study on the tail motion and speed in diplodocid sauropods is published by Conti et al. (2022), who find the speed that could be reached by diplodocid tails to be lower than the speed of sound, and find that the tail would not have withstood the stresses imposed by travelling at the speed of sound.
- Description of a nearly complete skull of a member of the genus Apatosaurus from the Upper Jurassic Morrison Formation (Como Bluff, Wyoming, United States), and a study on the tooth replacement in this specimen, is published by Peterson et al. (2022), who interpret their findings as indicative of a different tooth replacement pattern in Apatosaurus relative to Diplodocus, possibly pointing to the ecological niche partitioning among diplodocids and to Apatosaurus' preference for a food source with tougher vegetation.
- A study on bony pathologic structures stemming from the pneumatic features in the cervical vertebrae of a diplodocine specimen from the Lower O'Hair Quarry (Morrison Formation; Montana, United States) is published by Woodruff et al. (2022), who diagnose this specimen as likely affected by an avian-like airsacculitis, constituting the first identification of this disease in a non-avian dinosaur specimen.
- A study on the histology of teeth of Diplodocus is published by Price & Whitlock (2022).
- A study on the bone histology and paleobiology of the holotype specimen of Brachytrachelopan mesai is published by Windholz et al. (2022), who interpret the holotype as a sexually immature individual, and find evidence indicative of a sustained, accelerated growth.
- New specimen of Pilmatueia faundezi, providing new information on the anatomy of the axial skeleton and the pectoral girdle of this sauropod, is described from the Valanginian Mulichinco Formation (Argentina) by Windholz et al. (2022).
- A study on the external morphology, internal microanatomy and bone microstructure of the hemispinous processes of the vertebrae from the holotype specimen of Amargasaurus cazaui and an indeterminate dicraeosaurid specimen from the La Amarga Formation (Argentina), aiming to reconstruct soft tissues associated with those processes and to determine their functional significance, is published by Cerda, Novas, Carballido and Salgado (2022).
- Evidence indicating that dicraeosaurid vertebral pneumaticity was reduced relative to other eusauropod taxa is presented by Windholz et al. (2022).
- Description of rebbachisaurid fossil material from the Cretaceous lower Huincul Formation (El Orejano locality) (Argentina) is published by Bellardini et al. (2022), who interpret the remains as likely belonging to a unique taxon, thereby increasing the diversity of rebbachisaurids in the formation.
- A study on the skeletal anatomy and affinities of Agustinia ligabuei is published by Bellardini et al. (2022), who recover Agustinia as a rebbachisaurid.
- Four sauropod ribs preserving evidence of three different pathologies (including osteosclerosis) are described from the Middle Jurassic of Yunyang (China) by Tan et al. (2022).
- Ren et al. (2022) interpret Dashanpusaurus dongi as the earliest diverging macronarian; subsequently Ren et al. (2022) publish a comprehensive redescription of D. dongi.
- A study on the anatomy of the braince and inner ear of Europasaurus holgeri is published by Schade et al. (2022), who report the presence of a relatively large and morphologically adult-like endosseous labyrinth in very young individuals of Europasaurus, suggesting that hatchlings had to be light on their feet very early in their lives, and were likely precocial.
- Revision of the fossil record of non-titanosaur macronarians from South America is published by Carballido, Bellardini & Salgado (2022).
- A study on the morphology, preservation and taphonomy of the skin of Haestasaurus becklesii, and a review of sauropod skin morphology, is published by Pittman et al. (2022).
- A study on the anatomy and phylogenetic affinities of Ligabuesaurus leanzai, based on data from new postcranial elements assigned to the holotype specimen and from a newly referred specimen, is published by Bellardini et al. (2022).
- Description of teeth of a sauropod belonging to the group Somphospondyli from the Turonian Tamagawa Formation (Japan), and a study on the diet and mastication of this sauropod as inferred from tooth wear, is published by Sakaki et al. (2022).
- Description of the endocast of Phuwiangosaurus sirindhornae is published by Kaikaew et al. (2022).
- Previously unknown second cervical vertebra of Sibirotitan astrosacralis is described from the Aptian Ilek Formation (Kemerovo Oblast, Russia) by Averianov & Lopatin (2022).
- A study on the phylogenetic relationships of titanosaur sauropods is published by Carballido et al. (2022).
- A study on the morphological variability of hindlimb bones of titanosaur sauropods from the Lo Hueco Konzentrat-Lagerstätte (Villalba de la Sierra Formation, Spain) is published by Páramo et al. (2022).
- Theropod bite marks are reported on a sauropod rib from the Late Cretaceous Sāo Josè do Rio Preto Formation (Brazil) by Reis, Ghilardi, and Fernandes (2022), who interpret these marks as most likely being produced by an abelisaurid.
- Titanosaur tracks preserving claw impressions are reported from the Anacleto Formation (Argentina) by Tomaselli et al. (2022), who devise a new classification for titanosaur tracks and name the new ichnotaxon Teratopodus malarguensis.
- The first titanosaur nesting site from the Late Cretaceous of Brazil is reported from the Maastrichtian Serra da Galga Formation by Fiorelli et al. (2022).
- Description of titanosaur fossil material from the Late Cretaceous (Campanian-Maastrichtian) Mercedes Formation and Asencio Formation (Uruguay) is published by Soto et al. (2022).
- Pathological multi-shelled egg is described from a titanosaur nest from the Upper Cretaceous Lameta Formation (India) by Dhiman, Verma & Prasad (2022), who interpret this finding as possible evidence that titanosaurs had an oviductal functional morphology similar to birds.
- Review of the fossil record of titanosaur sauropods from the Campanian and Maastrichtian of South America is published by Santucci & Filippi (2022).
- Lourembam, Dhiman & Prasad (2022) report the preservation of a mineralized Membrana Testacea layer in titanosaur eggshells from a marlstone facies interbedded with the Deccan lava flows in Madhya Pradesh (India).
- A juvenile specimen of Diamantinasaurus matildae, providing information on the growth pattern of this sauropod, is described from the Upper Cretaceous Winton Formation (Australia) by Rigby et al. (2022).
- Teeth of members of Diamantinasauria, different from teeth of derived titanosaurs and more closely resembling teeth of early branching members of the titanosauriform radiation, are described from the Late Cretaceous Winton Formation (Australia) by Poropat et al. (2022), who also study the distribution of sauropod tooth morphotypes before and after deposition of the Winton Formation, and argue that a substantial sauropod turnover took place during the Cretaceous, with diverse Berriasian faunas encompassing a range of tooth morphologies being replaced by faunas comprising solely titanosaurs with limited dental variability by the end-Turonian.
- A mechanical analysis of Savannasaurus elliottorum is performed by Preuschoft (2022).
- A review of sauropod fossil material from the Kallamedu Formation, including bones of the giant enigmatic titanosaur Bruhathkayosaurus, is published by Pal & Ayyasami (2022).
- A reconstruction of the articular cartilage of the left elbow joint of Dreadnoughtus schrani is presented by Voegele et al. (2022).
- A study on the taphonomy and molecular preservation of the holotype of Dreadnoughtus schrani is published by Schroeter et al. (2022).
- Silva Junior et al. (2022) describe new fossil material of Baurutitan britoi from the Upper Cretaceous Serra da Galga Formation (Brazil), and interpret Trigonosaurus pricei as a junior synonym of B. britoi.
- A study on the anatomy of the appendicular skeleton and on the affinities of Rinconsaurus caudamirus is published by Pérez Moreno et al. (2022).
- A study on the microstructure of axial bones of Austroposeidon magnificus, Gondwanatitan faustoi and Maxakalisaurus topai, and on its implications for the knowledge of growth phases of these sauropods, is published by Brum et al. (2022).
- Curved, pencil-like sauropod teeth from the Upper Cretaceous Bostobe Formation (Kazakhstan) are referred to a representative of the clade Opisthocoelicaudiidae by Averianov & Lopatin (2022).
- A study proposing a method to determine the gait and limb phase of sauropods based on fossil tracksites is published by Lallensack & Falkingham (2022), who interpret their findings as suggestive of diagonal couplet walks, which would have allowed both sides of the body to be supported by the limbs at all times.
- Revision of the fossil record of sauropodomorph eggs, nests and embryos from South America is published by Fernández, Vila & Moreno-Azanza (2022).
- Keller & Or (2022) hypothesize that sauropods must have compacted the subsoil during their locomotion, presenting a paradox for productivity of the land that supported them.

=== Ornithischian research ===
- A study on the evolutionary relationships of ornithischian dinosaurs, based on a modified version of the dataset from the study of Müller & Garcia (2020), is published by Norman et al. (2022), who recover silesaurids as an evolutionary grade of early ornithischian dinosaurs, reintroduce the name Prionodontia for the least inclusive clade that includes Iguanodon bernissartensis, Echinodon becklesii and Scelidosaurus harrisonii, and name a new clade Parapredentata (the least inclusive clade that includes Silesaurus opolensis and Iguanodon bernissartensis).
- A study on the bone histology, life history and possible sociality of Lesothosaurus diagnosticus is published by Botha, Choiniere & Barrett (2022), who interpret their findings as indicating that this ornithischian lived in multigenerational herds.
- A study on the phylogenetic relationships of the neornithischian dinosaurs commonly referred to as "hypsilophodontids", aiming to determine causes of conflicting placements of these taxa in different phylogenetic analyses, is published by Brown et al. (2022).
- New information on the anatomy of the holotype specimen of Parksosaurus warreni is presented by Sues et al. (2022).
- A study aiming to determine whether ornithischian megaherbivores from the upper Oldman Formation (Alberta, Canada) partitioned their niches based on spatial patterns of occupation and resource-use, based on strontium, oxygen and carbon isotope data, is published by Cullen et al. (2022).
- A study on the dietary ecology of Hungarosaurus tormai and Mochlodon vorosi is published by Ősi et al. (2022), who interpret their findings as indicative of dietary selectivity and niche partitioning, with Hungarosaurus eating softer vegetation and Mochlodon feeding on tougher material.

==== Thyreophoran research ====
- Schade et al. (2022) create digital models of the braincase of Struthiosaurus austriacus, and evaluate the implication of its anatomy for the knowledge of the behavioral capacities of this dinosaur.
- Partial skull of a member or a relative of the genus Kunbarrasaurus is described from the Albian Toolebuc Formation by Frauenfelder et al. (2022), representing the oldest ankylosaurian material from Queensland (Australia) reported to date.
- A description of a partial thyreophoran osteoderm from an Early Jurassic Konservatlagerstätte near Grimmen, Germany is published by Schade & Ansorge (2022).
- A study on pathological osteoderms localized to the flanks in the hip region of the holotype specimen of Zuul crurivastator is published by Arbour, Zanno & Evans (2022), who argue that ankylosaurid tail clubs were primarily used for combat between members of the same species.
- A partial postcranial skeleton of Pinacosaurus from the Late Cretaceous Wulansuhai Formation (China) is described by Tan et al. (2022).

==== Cerapod research ====
- A study on the anatomy and evolution of the brains of ornithopod dinosaurs is published by Lauters, Vercauteren & Godefroit (2022), who report evidence which might be indicative of hadrosaurids having more developed cognitive abilities than previously assumed.
- A study on the phylogenetic relationships of iguanodontian ornithopods is published by Poole (2022), who names a new clade Rhabdodontoidea, defined as including all taxa more closely related to Zalmoxes robustus and Rhabdodon priscus than to Dryosaurus altus.
- A study on the bone histology and life history of an early member of Rhabdodontomorpha from the upper Barremian–lower Aptian of the Vegagete site (Spain) is published by Dieudonné, Torcida Fernández-Baldor & Stein (2022), who interpret the largest Vegagete ornithopod individual as a late subadult, making it the smallest ornithopod ever recovered, and interpret their findings as indicating that, unlike Late Cretaceous rhabdodontids, the Vegagete ornithopod shifted from a quadrupedal stance to a bipedal one at a juvenile stage.
- Description of postcranial material tentatively assigned to Camptosaurus sp. from the Late Jurassic Villar del Arzobispo Formation (Valencia, Spain) is published by Sánchez-Fenollosa et al. (2022)
- Redescription of the holotype of Draconyx loureiroi, including description of previously unreported material, and a study on the phylogenetic affinities of this taxon is published by Rotatori, Moreno-Azanza & Mateus (2022).
- Fossil material of a medium-sized iguanodontid is described from the Early Cretaceous (Barremian) Blesa Formation (Teruel Province, Spain) by Medrano-Aguado et al. (2022), who interpret it as belonging to a potentially new iguanodontid taxon.
- A new specimen of Iguanodon bernissartensis (a partial axial skeleton) is described from the Early Cretaceous (Upper Barremian) Arcillas de Morella Formation (Spain) by Gasulla et al. (2022)
- Description of new fossils of large bodied styracosternans pertaining to two different taxa from the Early Cretaceous El Castellar Formation (Teruel, Spain) is published by García-Cobeña, Verdú, and Cobos (2022), who also describe the first dinosaur tracksite from this formation.
- Fossil material of non-hadrosauriform styracosternans is described from the Lower Cretaceous Khok Kruat Formation by Samathi & Suteethorn (2022), representing the first record of a juvenile iguanodontian co-occurring with an adult (possibly of the same taxon) from Thailand.
- Description of a nearly complete and articulated skeleton of a juvenile hadrosauroid from the Upper Cretaceous Bayan Shireh Formation (Mongolia), distinct from Gobihadros mongoliensis and likely representing a second, previously unknown hadrosauroid taxon from this formation, is published by Averianov, Lopatin & Tsogtbaatar (2022).
- A clutch of subspherical dinosaur eggs, at least two of which contain identifiable hadrosauroid embryos with possible affinities with such taxa as Levnesovia transoxiana, Nanningosaurus dashiensis or Tanius sinensis, is described from the Upper Cretaceous Hekou Formation (China) by Xing et al. (2022).
- Redescription of two putative rhabdodontid braincases from the Maastrichtian of the Haţeg Basin (Romania) is published by Augustin et al. (2022), who reinterpret these specimens as hadrosauroid braincases, likely belonging to members of the species Telmatosaurus transsylvanicus.
- Review of the taxonomic status, phylogenetic relationships and biogeography of hadrosauroids known from Mexico is published by Ramírez-Velasco (2022).
- A study on the morphometric changes within the skull and dietary changes during growth of North American hadrosaurids is published by Wyenberg-Henzler, Patterson & Mallon (2022).
- A study on the beak shapes and limb segment proportions of hadrosaurids is published by Takasaki & Kobayashi (2022), who interpret their findings as indicating that lambeosaurines preferred mass consumption of low-quality food and had energy-efficient locomotion, while hadrosaurines preferred selective consumption of high-quality food and had energy-inefficient locomotor ecology.
- A study on the taphonomy and geochemical history of Brachylophosaurus canadensis specimen MOR 2598, attempting to determine the cause of protein preservation in the specimen's left femur, is published by Ullman, Ash, and Scannella (2022).
- A pathological ulna of a specimen of Amurosaurus riabinini, preserved with a hypertrophied and swollen distal region and with the distal articular surface engulfed within a large overgrowth of newly formed bone, is described from the Maastrichtian Udurchukan Formation (Amur Region, Russia) by Bertozzo et al. (2022), who interpret the bone as still healing prior to the animal's death, with the misalignment of the fracture and the resulting malunion of the two fragments of the bone probably causing the animal to limp and walk on three limbs.
- Sahaliyania elunchunorum is reinterpreted as a junior synonym of Amurosaurus riabinini by Xing et al. (2022).
- Takasaki et al. (2022) describe the first definitive specimens of Corythosaurus from the Judith River Formation (Montana, United States), extending known geographic range of this genus.
- A study on the taphonomy of a bonebed with fossils of members of the genus Gryposaurus from the lower unit of the Campanian Oldman Formation (Alberta, Canada), and on the bone microstructure of specimens from this bonebed, is published by Scott et al. (2022).
- The two smallest-known specimens of Gryposaurus notabilis are described from the Dinosaur Park Formation (Alberta, Canada) by Mallon et al. (2022), who evaluate the implications of these specimens for the knowledge of the skeletal growth of G. notabilis, and interpret them as indicating that the presence of secondary rides of the teeth in young hadrosaurines is ontogenetically transitory and not necessarily of any taxonomic significance.
- Description of the skin of a hadrosaurid specimen (probably belonging to the species Edmontosaurus annectens) from the Maastrichtian Frenchman Formation (Saskatchewan, Canada), preserving unique corrugated scales that have not been observed in this species before, is published by Libke et al. (2022).
- A study on the monodominant Edmontosaurus annectens bonebed from the Ruth Mason Dinosaur Quarry (Hell Creek Formation; South Dakota, United States), and on its implications for the knowledge of hadrosaurid growth and population dynamics, is published by Wosik & Evans (2022), who interpret their findings as indicating that E. annectens exhibited a similar growth trajectory to Maiasaura, and providing support for the hypothesized segregation between juvenile and adult hadrosaurids.
- Drumheller et al. (2022) describe soft tissue damage in the NDGS 2000 (formerly MRF-03) specimen of Edmontosaurus, consistent with injuries caused by predators or scavengers and interpreted as the first known examples of unhealed carnivore damage in dinosaurian soft tissue, and evaluate the implications of this finding for the knowledge of the fossilization pathway for soft tissues of this specimen.
- A method which can be used to determine the percent vascularity in any given CT slice of the frontoparietal is presented by Nirody et al. (2022), who use this method to study changes of vascularity in the frontoparietal dome of Stegoceras validum during its ontogeny.
- Moore et al. (2022) reconstruct the appendicular musculature of Stegoceras validum, and report evidence of adaptations of muscles for strengthening or stabilizing the pelvis and hind limbs which might have been beneficial for head- or flank-butting behaviour.
- A study on tooth replacement patterns in Yinlong downsi, Hualianceratops wucaiwanensis and Chaoyangsaurus youngi is published by Hu et al. (2022).
- The oldest umbilical scar reported to date, which is also the first umbilical scar reported to date in a non-avian dinosaur, is described in a specimen of Psittacosaurus from the Lower Cretaceous Jehol Group (China) by Bell et al. (2022).
- Description of the integument of the Frankfurt specimen of Psittacosaurus is published by Bell et al. (2022), who describe variations in the skin of the animal and discover the specimen's cloaca is crocodile-like in morphology.
- A new articulated skeleton of Yamaceratops dorngobiensis, representing the first substantially complete skeleton and the first known juvenile specimen of this taxon, is described from the Upper Cretaceous (?Santonian-Campanian) Javkhlant Formation (Mongolia) by Son et al. (2022).
- A study on the bone histology of Koreaceratops hwaseongensis is published by Baag & Lee (2022).
- Chen et al. (2022) report two skulls of Protoceratops hellenikorhinus from the Late Cretaceous Wulansuhai Formation (Alxa Right Banner, Inner Mongolia, China), expanding the known geographic range of the species, and provide a revised diagnosis of P. hellenikorhinus.
- A study on the anatomy of the postcranial skeleton of Wendiceratops pinhornensis, and on the taphonomy of the monodominant bonebed containing fossil material of this ceratopsid from the Campanian Oldman Formation in Alberta, Canada (interpreted as oldest evidence of herding behavior in a ceratopsid documented to date), is published by Scott, Ryan & Evans (2022).
- A study on the pathologies within bones of Pachyrhinosaurus perotorum from the Prince Creek Formation (Alaska, United States) is published by Fiorillo & Tykoski (2022), who find the occurrence of pathologies in the studied assemblage to be low and comparable to occurrences of pathologies in other populations of ceratopsids from the lower latitudes, and interpret this finding as indicating that hardships imposed on ceratopsids in the Arctic environment were not greater than in other environments.
- Mallon et al.(2022) redescribe two ceratopsid frills from Canada attributed to Torosaurus (representing the northernmost records of this genus reported to date), and evaluate possible implications of these specimens for determination of the status of Torosaurus as a genus distinct from Triceratops.
- A study on the fenestra perforating the right squamosal of the Triceratops horridus specimen known as Big John is published by D'Anastasio et al. (2022), who interpret this fenestra as the result of a traumatic event, possibly a fight with another Triceratops.
- De Rooij et al. (2022) present oxygen and carbon isotopic records from a large Triceratops bonebed ("Darnell Triceratops Bonebed") from the Maastrichtian Lance Formation (Wyoming, United States), and interpret these records as indicating that individuals from the "Darnell Triceratops Bonebed" lived in a transitional area between more open marsh settings and inland forests, such as fluvial systems, and casting doubts on the extent and significance of putative niche partitioning between ceratopsids and hadrosaurids, at least in this part of the Lance Formation.
- A study on the hadrosaurid and ceratopsid faunas of the Upper Cretaceous Prince Creek Formation, Cantwell Formation and Chignik Formation (Alaska, United States), and on the possible impact of the climate on differences of relative abundances of hadrosaurids and ceratopsids from these formations, is published by Fiorillo et al. (2022).

== Birds ==
=== New bird taxa ===
Name	Novelty	Status	Authors	Age	Type locality	Country	Notes	Images
Aegotheles zealandivetus	Sp. nov	Valid	Worthy et al.	Early Miocene	Bannockburn Formation	New Zealand	An owlet-nightjar; a species of Aegotheles.	
Alhuenia	Gen. et sp. nov	Valid	Agnolín	Early-Middle Miocene	Pinturas Formation	Argentina	A member of Parvigruidae. The type species is A. eduardotonnii.	
Allgoviachen	Gen. et sp. nov	In press	Mayr, Lechner & Böhme	Miocene (Tortonian)		Germany	A member of the family Anatidae. The type species is A. tortonica.	
Annakacygna	Gen. et 2 sp. nov	Valid	Matsuoka & Hasegawa	Miocene	Haraichi Formation	Japan	A member of the family Anatidae belonging to the tribe Cygnini. The type species is A. hajimei; genus also includes A. yoshiiensis.	
Archaeopsophia	Gen. et sp. nov	Valid	Agnolín	Early-Middle Miocene	Santa Cruz Formation	Argentina	A member of Psophiidae. The type species is A. aoni.	
Beiguornis	Gen. et sp. nov	Valid	Wang et al.	Early Cretaceous	Longjiang Formation	China	A member of Enantiornithes. The type species is B. khinganensis.	
Caroohierax	Gen. et sp. nov	Valid	Agnolín	Early-Middle Miocene	Pinturas Formation	Argentina	A member of Falconidae. The type species is C. rapoporti.	
Centuriavis	Gen. et sp. nov	Valid	Ksepka et al.	Miocene	Ash Hollow Formation	United States (Nebraska)	A member of the family Phasianidae, interpreted by the authors of its description as diverging prior to the grouse-turkey split. Genus includes new species C. lioae.	
Chainkanas	Gen. et sp. nov	Valid	Agnolín	Early-Middle Miocene	Pinturas Formation	Argentina	A screamer. The type species is C. koshon.	
Chehuenia	Gen. et sp. nov	Valid	Agnolín	Early-Middle Miocene	Santa Cruz Formation	Argentina	Originally described as a roller; Mayr & Kitchener (2024) argued that it cannot be assigned to this group. The type species is C. facongrandei.	
Confuciusornis shifan	Sp. nov	Valid	Wang et al.	Early Cretaceous	Jiufotang Formation	China		
Cryptogyps	Gen. et comb. nov	Valid	Mather, Lee, & Worthy	Mid-Late Pleistocene	Katipiri Formation	Australia	A member of Accipitridae; a new genus for "Taphaetus" lacertosus.	
Danielsraptor	Gen. et sp. nov	Valid	Mayr & Kitchener	Eocene (Ypresian)	London Clay	United Kingdom	A masillaraptorid stem-falconiform. The type species is D. phorusrhacoides.	
Dryornis hatcheri	Sp. nov	Valid	Degrange	Miocene	Santa Cruz Formation	Argentina	A member of Cathartidae; a species of Dryornis.	
Enskenia	Gen. et sp. nov	Valid	Agnolín	Early-Middle Miocene	Pinturas Formation	Argentina	A member of Strigiformes. The type species is E. galeanoi.	
Geokichla longitarsus	Sp. nov	Valid	Hume			Mauritius	A ground thrush, a species of Geokichla.	
Gypaetus georgii	Sp. nov	Valid	Sánchez-Marco	Late Miocene		Spain	A vulture; a species of Gypaetus (bearded vulture).	
Janavis	Gen. et sp. nov	Valid	Benito et al.	Late Cretaceous (Maastrichtian)	Maastricht Formation	Belgium	A toothed ornithurine bird, similar to Ichthyornis in its overall morphology, but bearing a pterygoid similar to those of extant members of Galloanserae. The type species is J. finalidens.	
Kaikenia	Gen. et sp. nov	Valid	Agnolín	Early-Middle Miocene	Santa Cruz Formation	Argentina	A member of Tadorninae. The type species is K. mourerchauvirea.	
Lutavis	Gen. et sp. nov	Valid	Mayr & Kitchener	Eocene (Ypresian)	London Clay	United Kingdom	Possibly a member of Afroaves. The type species is L. platypelvis.	
Mininothura	Gen. et sp. nov	Valid	Agnolín	Early-Middle Miocene	Pinturas Formation	Argentina	A member of Tinamidae. The type species is M. talenki.	
Minutornis	Gen. et sp. nov	Valid	Mayr & Kitchener	Eocene (Ypresian)	London Clay	United Kingdom	A small zygodactylid-like bird, a member of Parapasseres of uncertain affinities. The type species is M. primoscenoides.	
Miosurnia	Gen. et sp. nov		Li, Stidham & Zhou in Li et al.	Late Miocene	Liushu Formation	China	A true owl belonging to the clade Surniini. The type species is M. diurna.	
Miotadorna catrionae	Sp. nov	Disputed	Tennyson et al.	Miocene (Altonian)	Bannockburn Formation	New Zealand	A member of the family Anatidae belonging to the subfamily Tadorninae. Worthy et al. (2022) considered it to be a junior synonym of Miotadorna sanctibathansi, while Tennyson et al. (2024) reaffirmed the validity of the species.	
Musivavis	Gen. et sp. nov	Valid	Wang et al.	Early Cretaceous (Aptian)	Jiufotang Formation	China	A member of Enantiornithes. The type species is M. amabilis.	
Nasidytes	Gen. et sp. nov	Valid	Mayr & Kitchener	Eocene (Ypresian)	London Clay	United Kingdom	A stem-gaviiform. Genus includes new species N. ypresianus.	
Neophron lolis	Sp. nov	Valid	Sánchez-Marco	Late Miocene		Spain	A vulture; a species of Neophron (Egyptian vulture).	
Notochen	Gen. et sp. nov	Valid	Worthy et al.	Early Miocene	Bannockburn Formation	New Zealand	A large anserine-like anatid. The type species is N. bannockburnensis.	
Patagogrus	Gen. et sp. nov	Valid	Agnolín	Early-Middle Miocene	Pinturas Formation	Argentina	A member of Gruidae. The type species is P. olsoni.	
Peioa	Gen. et sp. nov	Valid	Agnolín	Early-Middle Miocene	Santa Cruz Formation	Argentina	A member of Anseriformes. The type species is P. australis.	
Plesiocathartes insolitipes	Sp. nov	Valid	Mayr & Kitchener	Eocene (Ypresian)	London Clay	United Kingdom	A member of Leptosomiformes.	
Pliogallus csarnotanus	Sp. nov	Valid	Kessler & Horváth	Pliocene		Hungary	A member of the family Phasianidae.	
Primoscens carolinae	Sp. nov	Valid	Mayr & Kitchener	Eocene (Ypresian)	London Clay	United Kingdom	A member of the family Zygodactylidae.	
Psittacomimus	Gen. et sp. nov	Valid	Mayr & Kitchener	Eocene (Ypresian)	London Clay	United Kingdom	A member of the family Psittacopedidae. The type species is P. eos.	
?Psittacopes occidentalis	Sp. nov	Valid	Mayr & Kitchener	Eocene (Ypresian)	London Clay	United Kingdom	A member of the family Psittacopedidae.	
Spatula praeclypeata	Sp. nov	Valid	Zelenkov	Early Pleistocene		Crimean Peninsula	An anatid belonging to the genus Spatula.	
Tamtamia	Gen. et sp. nov	Valid	Agnolín	Early-Middle Miocene	Pinturas Formation	Argentina	A member of Tadorninae. The type species is T. yzurietai.	
Thegornis spivacowi	Sp. nov	Valid	Agnolín	Early-Middle Miocene	Pinturas Formation	Argentina	A member of Herpetotheriinae; a species of Thegornis.	
Waltonavis	Gen. et 2 sp. nov	Valid	Mayr & Kitchener	Eocene (Ypresian)	London Clay	United Kingdom	A small leptosomiform-like bird. The type species is W. paraleptosomus; genus also includes W. danielsi.	
Yatenavis	Gen. et sp. nov	In press	Herrera et al.	Late Cretaceous (Maastrichtian)	Chorrillo Formation	Argentina	A member of Enantiornithes. The type species is Y. ieujensis.	
Ypresiglaux	Gen. et sp. et comb. nov	Valid	Mayr & Kitchener	Early Eocene	London Clay	United Kingdom; United States (Virginia)	An owl. The type species is Y. michaeldanielsi; genus also includes "Eostrix" gulottai Mayr (2016). Announced in 2022; the final article version was published in 2023.	
Zealandornis	Gen. et sp. nov	Valid	Worthy et al.	Early Miocene	Bannockburn Formation	New Zealand	A bird with morphology most similar to that of mousebirds, assigned to the new family Zealandornithidae of uncertain affinities but likely belonging to Telluraves. The type species is Z. relictus.	

=== Avian research ===
- Evidence indicating that the development of the pelvis of bird embryos parallels the evolution of the pelvis during the non-avian dinosaur-to-bird transition is presented by Griffin et al. (2022).
- A study aiming to determine whether the flapping flight of birds evolved through the stage of wing-assisted incline running is published by Kuznetsov & Panyutina (2022); their conclusions are subsequently contested by Heers et al. (2022).
- A study on the skull anatomy of a well-preserved new specimen of Jeholornis, and on the morphometrics of the mandible and cranium of Jeholornis is published by Hu et al. (2022), who interpret their findings as indicating that Jeholornis consumed fruits, and raising the possibility of seed dispersal by early birds.
- Description of the cranial osteology of Jeholornis prima, providing evidence of sensory adaptation (including relatively large olfactory bulbs) and adaptation to diurnal habit, is published by Hu et al. (2022).
- A study on the skeletal morphometrics of a sample of specimens of Confuciusornis sanctus is published by Marugán-Lobón & Chiappe (2022), who interpret their findings as indicating that the polyphasic life cycle of C. sanctus was different from the life cycle of modern birds, and possibly indicative of change of food resources foraged by this bird during its ontogeny.
- Evidence of calcium phosphate composition and the presence of phosphatized corneocytes in a foot claw sheath of a specimen of Confuciusornis sanctus is presented by He et al. (2022).
- Wang et al. (2022) reconstruct the pectoral girdles of Sapeornis and Piscivorenantiornis.
- Chiappe et al. (2022) describe a partial braincase of a member of Enantiornithes from the Upper Cretaceous Adamantina Formation (Brazil), and interpret its anatomy as indicating that some endocranial traits previously considered to be unique to members of Neornithes (an expanded, flexed brain, a ventral connection between the brain and spinal column, modified vestibular system) were also present in at least some members of Enantiornithes.
- A study on the diet of members of the family Longipterygidae is published by Miller et al. (2022).
- Wang et al. (2022) present a three-dimensional reconstruction of the skull of Yuanchuavis kompsosoura, providing evidence of the presence of a mixture of plesiomorphic temporal and palatal regions and derived facial anatomies.
- A study on the morphology of the scutellate and interstitial scales of a specimen of Gansus yumenensis from the Lower Cretaceous Xiagou Formation (China) is published by Zhao et al. (2022), who interpret this finding as indicating that all four types of scales present in modern birds were already present in Early Cretaceous birds, and that avian scales are likely homologous with scales of non-avian dinosaurs.
- Review of the general anatomy, taxonomy, phylogeny, evolutionary trends and paleoecology of hesperornithiforms is published by Bell & Chiappe (2022).
- New information on the anatomy of the postcranial skeleton of Ichthyornis, based on data from 40 previously undescribed specimens, is presented by Benito et al. (2022).
- Review of the palaeognath fossil record is published by Widrig & Field (2022).
- A study on the stratigraphic provenance of Psammornis eggshells (probably produced by giant ostriches), and on their implications for the knowledge of the evolutionary history of struthionids, is published by Buffetaut (2022).
- Demarchi et al. (2022) report the recovery of mineral-bound peptide sequences from an ostrich eggshell sample from the Miocene Liushu Formation (Linxia Basin, Gansu, China).
- Revision of the type material of Struthio asiaticus is published by Buffetaut (2022), who interprets the type material as likely coming from the Siwaliks of present-day India, considers S. asiaticus to be about as tall as a living male African ostrich but probably more robustly built, as does not consider reports of S. asiaticus outside the Indian subcontinent to be based on convincing evidence.
- Putative tibiotarsus and a second limb bone of Diogenornis from the Sarmiento Formation (Argentina) are reevaluated by Acosta Hospitaleche & Picasso (2022), who interpret the tibiotarsus as belonging to an indeterminate palaeognath and the second limb bone to as belonging to a penguin, indicating that the presence of Diogenornis outside of Brazil cannot be confirmed.
- An overview and update of the rhea fossil record from South America and Antarctica is published by Picasso, Acosta Hospitaleche & Mosto (2022).
- Partial tarsometatarsus of a neognath bird from the Eocene Na Duong Formation (Vietnam) is published by Massonne, Böhme & Mayr (2022).
- A study on the taxonomic identity of the extinct giant bird that produced eggs known from eggshell fragments from Pleistocene sites in Australia, some of which bear signs of cooking during a narrow temporal window 50 ± 5 ka B.P., is published by Demarchi et al. (2022), who interpret their findings as supporting the attribution of the studied eggshells to Genyornis.
- A study on the histology of long bones and life history of Dromornis stirtoni is published by Chinsamy, Handley & Worthy (2022).
- A study on the relationships between the shape and size of extant waterfowl tarsometatarsi and their locomotory habits, and on their implications for the knowledge of the locomotory habits of Cayaoa and Paranyroca, is published by De Mendoza & Gómez (2022).
- A study on the morphological variation of the postcranial skeletons of the Malagasy shelduck, and on its implications for the knowledge of the biology of this species, is published by Nomenjanahary et al. (2022).
- Partial coracoid of a member of the genus Chloephaga is described from the Upper Pleistocene Toropí/Yupoí Formation at Arroyo Toropí (Corrientes Province, Argentina) by Álvarez-Herrera et al. (2022), representing the northernmost record of the genus reported to date.
- A study on the neuroanatomy of Sylviornis neocaledoniae is published by Riamon et al. (2022), who interpret their findings as indicative of adaptation of this bird to crepuscular lifestyle.
- Fossil material of a flamingo morphologically similar to the modern genera Phoenicopterus and Phoenicoparrus is reported from the Hemingfordian of Southern California (United States) by McDonald & Steadman (2022), extending the chronological range of modern flamingos.
- Fossil material of buttonquails is described from the latest Oligocene and late early to middle Miocene of France by De Pietri et al. (2022), bridging the large temporal gap in the fossil record of this group from the early Oligocene to the late Miocene.
- Description of a partial humerus belonging to an auk from the Pliocene Fukagawa Group (Japan) is published by Aotsuka & Endo (2022).
- A review of the evolutionary and biogeographic history of penguins is published by Pelegrín & Acosta Hospitaleche (2022).
- A study on the comparative anatomy of the synsacral canal in extant and fossil penguins is published by Jadwiszczak, Svensson-Marcial & Mörs (2022).
- Description of a new partial fossil sternum belonging to a member of Procellariidae from the Middle Pleistocene Ichijiku Formation (Japan) is published by Aotsuka, Isaji & Endo (2022).
- New fossil material of Leptoptilos robustus is described from Flores (Indonesia) by Meijer et al. (2022), who interpret their findings as indicating that L. robustus was almost certainly capable of active flight and that it was similar in overall size and morphology to Leptoptilos falconeri, and potentially indicating that L. falconeri, L. robustus, Leptoptilos titan and Leptoptilos lüi represent either a single giant stork species or a group of very closely related species that stretched across Africa and Eurasia from the Pliocene until the Late Pleistocene.
- A study on the evolutionary history of Coragyps occidentalis, based on data from the genome of a 14,000-year-old specimen from the Casa del Diablo cave (Peru), is published by Ericson et al. (2022).
- Description of a large condor from the Late Pleistocene Luján Formation (Argentina) is published by Agnolín, Brissón Egli & Álvarez–Herrera (2022).
- Studies on evolutionary stasis in red-tailed hawks, Swainson's hawks, Spizaetus grinnelli, Neophrontops americanus, northern harriers, Buteogallus fragilis and ferruginous hawks from the La Brea Tar Pits across the Last Glacial Maximum are published by Balassa, Prothero & Syverson (2022), Cleaveland, Prothero & Syverson (2022), DeAnda, Prothero & Marriott (2022), Olson et al. (2022). Marriott, Prothero & Watmore (2022), Santos, Prothero & Marriott (2022), and Watmore & Prothero (2022), respectively.
- A nearly complete skeleton referred to the genus Buteo is described from the late Miocene of Roddi, Italy by Pavia et al. (2022).
- A partial humerus referred to Buteo spassovi is described by Boev (2022).
- A new partial pedal phalanx of a large, recently extinct barn-owl is described from the Holocene of Guadeloupe by Gala, Laroulandie & Lenoble (2022).
- An atlas of a great grey owl is described from the Pleistocene of the Devetashka Cave (Bulgaria) by Boev & Mikkola (2022).
- A study on the comparative anatomy of the passerine carpometacarpus, with implications for assessing the phylogenetic affinities of fossil passerines, is published by Steell et al. (2022).
- Revision of the fossil material of birds from Cooper's D locality (South Africa) is published by Pavia et al. (2022).
- Description of an assemblage of fossil birds from the Middle Pleistocene of Galería, Spain is published by Núñez-Lahuerta et al. (2022).
- Description of the fossil material of birds from the Magdalenian of El Juyo, Spain is published by Rufà et al. (2022).
- Description of the fossil material of birds from the Dieu and Maxa I Caves in Vietnam is published by Boev (2022).
- A catalogue of fossil and subfossil birds from Cuba is published by Suárez (2022).
- A study on the effect of past climate oscillations in the Western Palearctic and Africa on the distribution of the grey partridge, the common quail, the corn crake, the little owl, the snowy owl and the Alpine chough is published by Carrera, Pavia & Varela (2022).
- A study on plant material from rock overhangs from mid-late Holocene sites along the Kawarau-Cromwell-Roxburgh Gorges in Central Otago (New Zealand), much of which was likely transported as roosting material or consumed by moa birds, and on its implications for the knowledge of moa diet and ecology (including the first known evidence of the consumption of kōwhai by moa birds), is published by Pole (2022).
- Evidence from ancient mitochondrial genomes indicative of increase in the population size and genetic diversity of eastern moa after the Last Glacial Maximum, as well as indicative of higher genetic diversity in eastern moa from the southern extent of their range, is presented by Verry, Mitchell & Rawlence (2022), who interpret their findings as indicating that eastern moa expanded from a single glacial refugium following the Last Glacial Maximum.
- A study on the bone histology of extant and extinct large terrestrial birds, aiming to determine whether bone microanatomy can be used to infer the locomotion mode of large terrestrial birds, is published by Canoville, Chinsamy & Angst (2022).

== Pterosaurs ==
=== New pterosaur taxa ===
Name	Novelty	Status	Authors	Age	Type locality	Country	Notes	Images
Cascocauda	Gen. et sp. nov	Valid	Yang et al.	Middle–Late Jurassic (Callovian–Oxfordian)	Tiaojishan Formation	China	An anurognathid. The type species is C. rong.	
Dearc	Gen. et sp. nov	Valid	Jagielska et al.	Middle Jurassic (Bathonian)	Lealt Shale Formation	United Kingdom (Scotland)	A large (2.5 metre wingspan) rhamphorhynchine pterosaur. Genus includes new species D. sgiathanach.	
Epapatelo	Gen. et sp. nov	Valid	Fernandes et al.	Late Cretaceous (Maastrichtian)	Mocuio Formation	Angola	A member of Pteranodontia. The type species is E. otyikokolo.	
Lingyuanopterus	Gen. et sp. nov	Valid	Xu, Jiang & Wang	Early Cretaceous (Aptian)	Jiufotang Formation	China	An istiodactylid. The type species is L. camposi.	
Pachagnathus	Gen. et sp. nov	Valid	Martínez et al.	Late Triassic (Norian)	Quebrada del Barro Formation	Argentina	A raeticodactylid pterosaur. The type species is P. benitoi.	
Thanatosdrakon	Gen. et sp. nov	Valid	Ortiz David, González Riga & Kellner	Late Cretaceous (Coniacian–Santonian)	Plottier Formation	Argentina	An azhdarchid. The type species is T. amaru.	
Yelaphomte	Gen. et sp. nov	Valid	Martínez et al.	Late Triassic (Norian)	Quebrada del Barro Formation	Argentina	A raeticodactylid pterosaur. The type species is Y. praderioi.	

=== Pterosaur research ===
- Description of the skeletal anatomy of Dimorphodon macronyx is published by Sangster (2022).
- A study comparing cranial and dental morphology of anurognathid pterosaurs and extant birds and bats is published by Clark & Hone (2022), who find anurognathids to occupy similar morphospaces as extant crepuscular and nocturnal insectivores.
- A study reinterpreting the orbital, antorbital and narial fenestrae in the skulls of the anurognathid pterosaurs, based mainly on data from the skulls of specimens of Batrachognathus volans, and aiming to determine the phylogenetic affinities of anurognathids is published by Dalla Vecchia (2022).
- Two specimens of Kunpengopterus sinensis preserved with bromalites are described from the Jurassic Tiaojishan Formation (China) by Jiang et al. (2022), who interpret the bromalites as fossilized gastric pellets, and evaluate their implications for the knowledge of the diet and the digestive system of this pterosaur.
- Augustin et al. (2022) describe a specimen of Pterodactylus antiquus from the Upper Jurassic (Kimmeridgian) Torleite Formation (Germany), representing the oldest record of this species reported to date.
- A new ctenochasmatid assemblage from the Early Cretaceous Quebrada Monardes Formation (Chile) is reported by Alarcón et al. (2022).
- Redescription of the holotype specimen of Moganopterus zhuiana is published by Gao et al. (2022).
- A study on the soft tissues and on the feasibility of the water launch in an aurorazhdarchid specimen from the Late Jurassic Solnhofen Lagoon is published by Pittman et al. (2022).
- New fossil material of Bogolubovia orientalis is described from the Campanian Rybushka Formation (Penza Oblast, Russia) by Averianov & Kurin (2022), who consider Bogolubovia to be a valid taxon that can be distinguished from the pteranodontids Pteranodon and Volgadraco.
- A study aiming to determine the ability of a 5-m-wingspan ornithocheiran pterosaur (SMNK PAL 1133, a specimen of Anhanguera or Coloborhynchus from the Romualdo Formation in Brazil) to assume the poses required to launch bipedally or quadrupedally is published by Griffin et al. (2022).
- Duque, Pinheiro & Barreto (2022) describe an anterior fragment of a rostrum of Anhanguera that lacks a sagittal crest, and interpret the absence of a crest in the studied specimen as indicating that this structure varied in terms of ontogeny and/or sex in Anhanguera.
- Redescription and a study on the phylogenetic affinities of Ferrodraco lentoni is published by Pentland et al. (2022).
- The first fossil material of azhdarchoid pterosaurs from the Albian Gault Formation (Kent, England, United Kingdom) is described by Smith & Martill (2022).
- New skeleton of Sinopterus, providing additional information of the postcranial morphology of this pterosaur, is described by Zhou, Niu & Yu (2022).
- Description of a medium-sized wing skeleton of Sinopterus from the Jiufotang Formation, possibly representing a late juvenile ontogenetic stage, and a study on the histology and life history of this specimen is published by Zhou et al. (2022).
- Cincotta et al. (2022) describe a specimen of Tupandactylus (belonging or related to the species T. imperator) from the Lower Cretaceous Crato Formation (Brazil) associated with skin, monofilaments and branched integumentary structures preserving melanosomes that show tissue-specific geometries (a feature previously known only from theropod dinosaurs), and interpret this finding as indicating that branched integumentary structures in pterosaurs are feathers, as well as providing evidence of deep evolutionary origins of tissue-specific partitioning of melanosome geometry.
- A new specimen of Caiuajara dobruskii, representing the most complete skull of a member of this species known so far and providing new information on the cranial anatomy of this pterosaur, is described by Canejo et al. (2022).
- New pterosaur footprint assemblage is described from the Cenomanian Jangdong Formation (South Korea) by Jung et al. (2022), who interpret the studied footprints as possibly produced by small dsungaripteroids, and possibly indicative of gregarious behavior by individuals from different age groups.
- A fragment of the wing metacarpal of a member or a relative of the genus Lonchognathosaurus is described from the Lower Cretaceous Ilek Formation at the Novochernorechensk locality (Krasnoyarsk Territory, Russia) by Averianov et al. (2022), representing the first pterosaur postcranial bone from this formation and the first record of a dsungaripterid from Russia reported to date.
- Cervical vertebra of a large pterosaur is described from the Campanian coastal marine deposits of Izhberda Quarry near the town of Orsk (Orenburg Oblast, Russia) by Averianov, Zverkov & Nikiforov (2022), who interpret this finding as the first record of a giant azhdarchid on the territory of Russia reported to date.
- Díaz-Martínez et al. (2022) describe four pterosaur manus tracks from the Upper Cretaceous Anacleto Formation (Argentina, representing the first occurrence of pterosaurs from the lower–middle Campanian of Argentina and expanding the knowledge of the worldwide pterosaur ichnological Upper Cretaceous record.

== Other archosaurs ==
=== Other new archosaur taxa ===
Name	Novelty	Status	Authors	Age	Type locality	Country	Notes	Images
Gamatavus	Gen. et sp. nov	Valid	Pretto et al.	Middle-Late Triassic (Ladinian-Carnian)	Santa Maria Formation	Brazil	A silesaurid. The type species is G. antiquus.	
Maehary	Gen. et sp. nov	Valid	Kellner et al.	Late Triassic (Norian)	Candelária Sequence of the Santa Maria Supersequence	Brazil	Probably an early-diverging member of Pterosauromorpha. The type species is M. bonapartei.	

=== Other archosaur research ===
- A study on the morphospace occupation of distinct skeletal regions of lagerpetids, aiming to determine which portions of the lagerpetid skeleton are more similar to the anatomy of pterosaurs, is published by Müller (2022).
- Faxinalipterus minimus, originally classified as an early pterosaur, is reinterpreted as a lagerpetid by Kellner et al. (2022).
- Foffa et al. (2022) present new whole-skeletal reconstruction and a revised diagnosis of Scleromochlus taylori, confirming that it was a member of Pterosauromorpha.
- A femur of an indeterminate dinosauromorph is described from the Middle Triassic Dinodontosaurus Assemblage Zone (Pinheiros-Chiniquá Sequence, Brazil) by Müller & Garcia (2022), potentially representing the oldest dinosauromorph from South America reported to date.

== General research ==
- Gatesy et al. (2022) propose a standard methodological approach for measuring the relative position and orientation of the major segments of the pelvis and hindlimb of extant and fossil archosaurs in three dimensions.
- A study on the locomotion of extant and extinct archosaurs, reevaluating postulated superiority of early dinosaurs in locomotor function and performance compared with other archosaurs, is published by Cuff et al. (2022).
- A study on the evolution of the orbit shape in Mesozoic archosauromorphs is published by Lautenschlager (2022).
- Sakamoto (2022) presents modelling framework that allows the prediction of jaw muscle parameters and bite force in extinct archosaurs from skull width and phylogeny.
- A study aiming to determine how well attachment areas of hindlimb muscles of archosaurs matches each muscle's physiological cross-sectional area, based on data from extant archosaurs (primarily Nile crocodiles and elegant crested tinamous), is published by Cuff et al. (2022), who use their findings to reconstruct physiological cross-sectional areas of the hindlimb muscles of Coelophysis bauri.
- A study on the evolutionary history of morphogenesis of the femoral head from early archosaurs to crown birds, based on data from fossil record and from embryos of extant animals, is published by Egawa et al. (2022).
- Evidence from molecular analyses of modern and fossil skeletal samples, interpreted as indicating that metabolic rates consistent with endothermy are ancestral to ornithodirans, is presented by Wiemann et al. (2022); their conclusions are subsequently challenged by Motani et al. (2023), who argue that inference of endothermy based on ALE biomarkers and ancestral state reconstruction is poorly supported by the current evidence, criticism that has been addressed by the authors.
- A study on the diversification and body size evolution of terrestrial pan-avian archosaurs along the Triassic and Early Jurassic is published by Langer & Godoy (2022)
- A study on the proportions of the feet of bipedal and potentially bipedal archosaurs (including dinosaurs), and on their implications for the identification of trackmakers of putative Late Triassic–Early Jurassic dinosaur footprints, is published by Farlow et al. (2022), who argue that the majority of well-preserved Eubrontes footprints was more likely to be produced by theropods than sauropodomorphs, but find it difficult to determine the most likely makers of Otozoum.
- A study on the potential soaring performances of extinct giant birds and pterosaurs is published by Goto et al. (2022).
- Pittman et al. (2022) document the preserved soft-tissue profiles of the shoulder and chest of Microraptor, Anchiornis, Archaeopteryx, Confuciusornis and Sapeornis, and evaluate their implications for the knowledge of early flight development in theropods.
- Pittman et al. (2022) attempt to infer the ecology of early flyers Ambopteryx, Microraptor, Anchiornis, Archaeopteryx, Confuciusornis, Fortunguavis, Sapeornis and Yanornis from the anatomy of their feet.
- A study on the diversity of avian and non-avian theropod tracks from the Aptian Ninesting Creek site (Gething Formation, British Columbia, Canada) is published by Lockley et al. (2022), who report evidence indicating that the diversity of smaller avian and non-avian theropod tracks outnumbers large theropod morphotypes by about 7:1.
- Description of archosaur eggshells from the Late Cretaceous El Gallo Formation (Mexico) and a study on the use of the eggshells to infer the environment of the area is published by Cabrera-Hernández et al. (2022).
