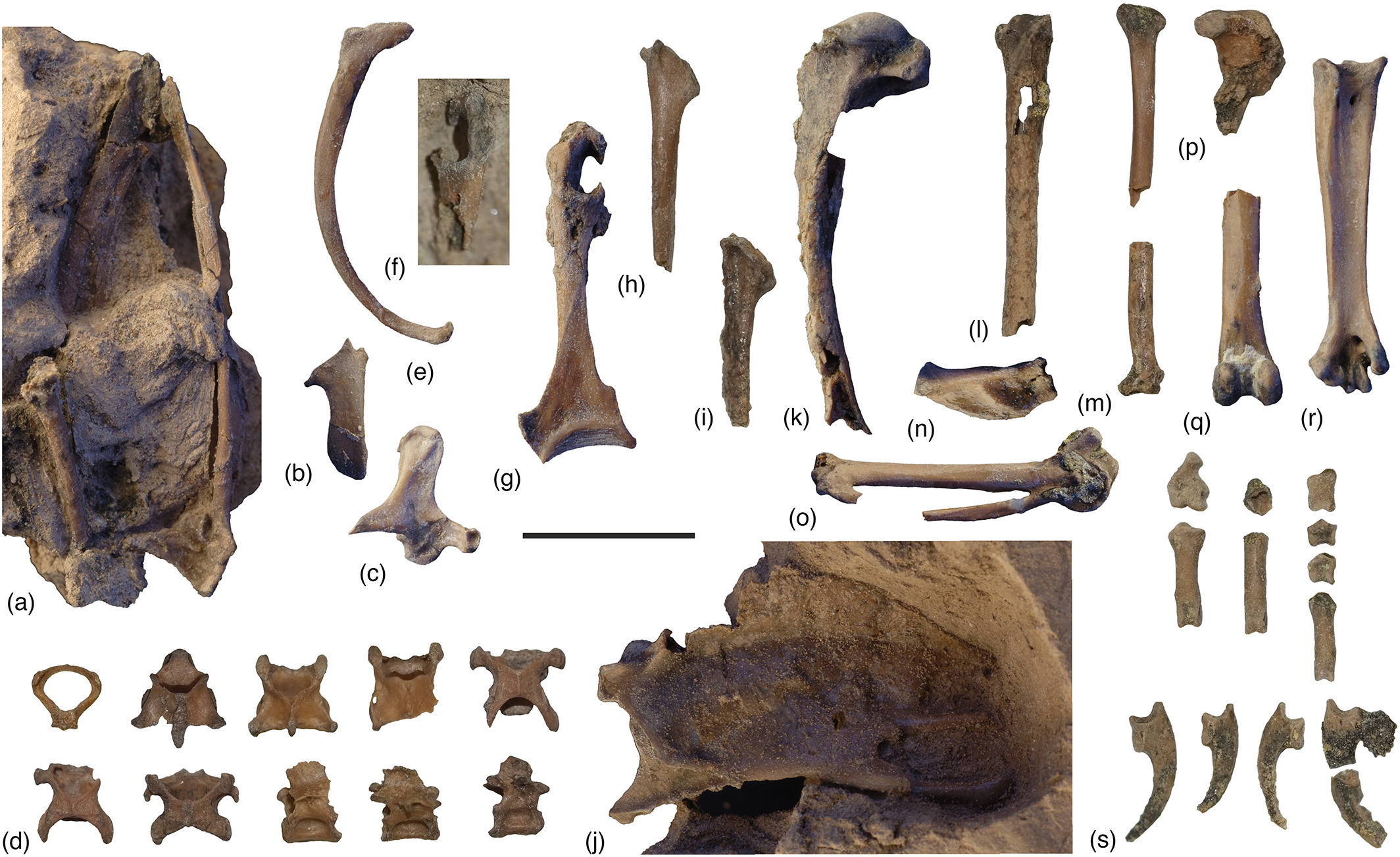
- Holotype elements of Y. michaeldanielsi

Scientific classification
- Kingdom: Animalia
- Phylum: Chordata
- Class: Aves
- Order: Strigiformes
- Genus: †Ypresiglaux; Mayr & Kitchener, 2022

Type species
- †Ypresiglaux michaeldanielsi Mayr & Kitchener, 2022

Other species
- †Ypresiglaux gulottai (Mayr, 2016)

Synonyms
- Eostrix gulottai Mayr, 2016

= Ypresiglaux =

Ypresiglaux Temporal range: Early Eocene, 54.6–55 Ma

Extinct owl genus

Ypresiglaux (lit. 'Ypresian owl') is an extinct owl genus known from fossils dated to the Early Eocene. The genus contains two named species; the type species, Ypresiglaux michaeldanielsi, is known from a partial skeleton found in the London Clay Formation of Essex, United Kingdom. The second species, Ypresiglaux gulottai, is known from a distal tarsometatarsus from the Nanjemoy Formation of Virginia, United States.

== Discovery and naming ==
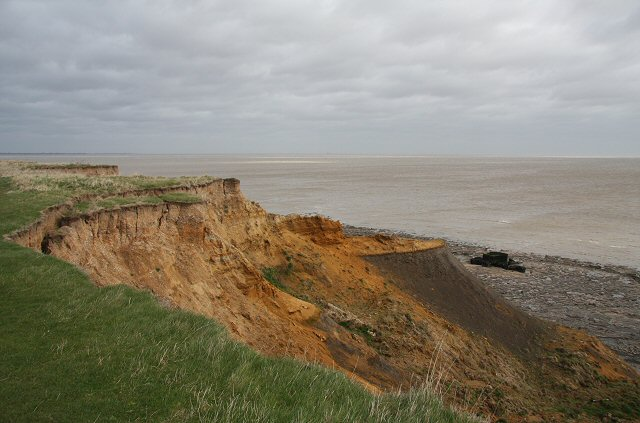
Cliffs near the Y. michaeldanielsi type locality

Ypresiglaux was described as a new genus in 2022 by German zoologist Gerald Mayr and British zoologist Andrew C. Kitchener. The generic name, Ypresiglaux, combines a reference to the Ypresian-dated locality of the type species with the Greek word glaux, meaning 'owl'. The type species, Y. michaeldanielsi, was described on the basis of specimen NMS.Z.2021.40.26, a partial skeleton collected in 1992 by Michael Daniels. This specimen, which includes the mandible, vertebrae, pectoral girdle, wing bones, and a partial right leg, was designated as the holotype. These fossils were discovered in layers of the London Clay Formation (Walton Member), which is located near Walton-on-the-Naze in Essex, England. The specific name, michaeldanielsi, honors the discoverer of the holotype. Y. michaeldanielsi is one of the most completely-known Palaeogene owls.

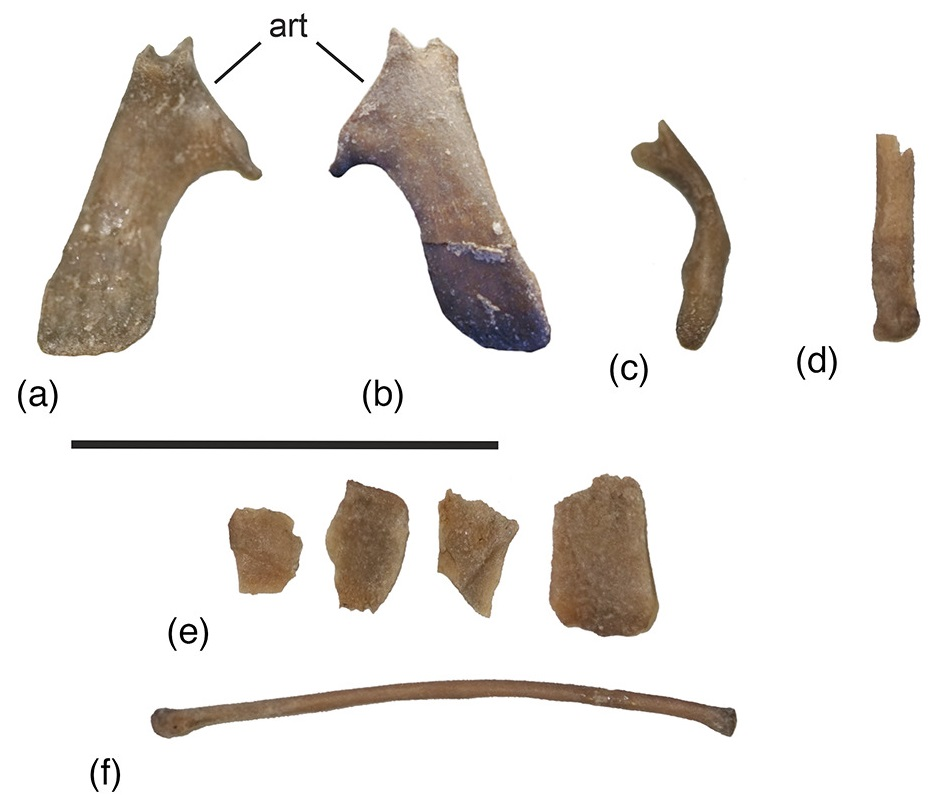
Skull elements of Y. michaeldanielsi

Additional fossil material, consisting of a partial right femur and tarsometatarsus, and pedal phalanges (specimen NMS.Z.2021.40.27) was collected from the Walton Member of the London Clay Formation in 1982. Since the fossil material is slightly larger than overlapping bones of Y. michaeldanielsi, it is possible that it represents a female specimen of the latter, since sexual dimorphism has been consistently observed in owls. Some important differences between the bones suggest that they may represent a distinct species. However, due to the lack of morphological differences, the specimen could not be confidently placed beyond Ypresiglaux sp.

In 2016, Gerald Mayr described a distal right tarsometatarsus as belonging to a new species of the extinct owl genus Eostrix, E. gulottai. The holotype specimen, SMF Av 627, was discovered in layers of the Eocene (Ypresian)-dated Nanjemoy Formation (Potapaco Member) of Stafford County, Virginia, USA. In 2022, Mayr and Kitchener transferred 'Eostrix' gulottai to the new genus Ypresiglaux, creating the new combination, Y. gulottai. The specific name honors Marco Gulotta, the discoverer of the specimen.

== Description ==
Ypresiglaux was a very small owl. Y. michaeldanielsi was comparable in size to the Eurasian pygmy owl, which has a body mass of 50–77 grams. Y. gulottai was even smaller, and represents the smallest known owl (extinct or otherwise). It likely had a diet comparable to the similarly sized extant long-whiskered owlet and elf owl, which primarily eat arthropods.

Ypresiglaux likely did not have the same degree of head rotational mobility as extant owls due to differences in the first cervical (neck) vertebrae (the atlas and axis). Mayr and Kitchener (2022) suggested that Ypresiglaux occupied a diurnal niche, contrary to many extant owls, which are often nocturnal. Preserved fossilized toe pad integument was observed on a piece of matrix collected with a pedal phalanx. A similar condition is seen in the holotype of the contemporary Lutavis platypelvis.

== Classification ==
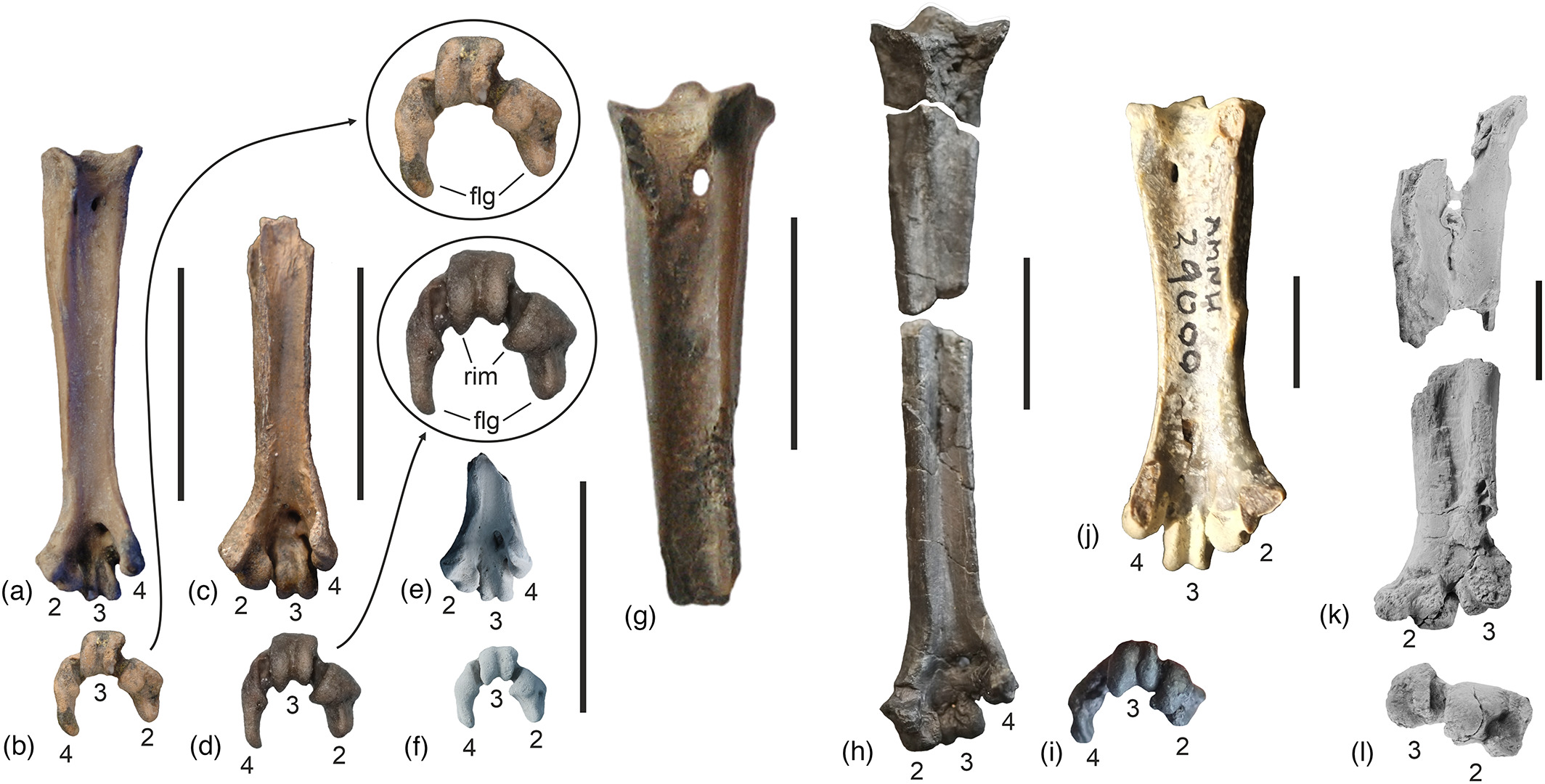
Tarsometatarsi of Y. michaeldanielsi (a, b), Y. sp. (c, d), and Y. gulattai (e, f) compared to other fossil Strigiformes

In their phylogenetic analyses, Mayr & Kitchener (2022) consistently recovered Ypresiglaux as part of the owl stem group (early-diverging member of the Strigiformes). Their strict consensus tree recovered a largely unresolved polytomy of stem owls, with both Ypresiglaux species in a monophyletic clade. Meanwhile, the majority-rule consensus tree yielded slightly improved resolution, albeit with both Ypresiglaux species in a polytomy with the owl crown group (clade including all modern owls). They stated that the discovery of additional fossil material could provide more insight into the exact phylogenetic relationships of Ypresiglaux. The cladograms below display their results using different analytical techniques.

Topology 1: Strict consensus tree

- Strigiformes
  - †Berruornis orbisantiqui
  - †Ogygoptynx wetmorei
  - †Eostrix tsaganica
  - †Palaeoglaux artophoron
  - - †Primoptynx poliotauros
    - - †Oligostrix rupelensis
      - †Minerva antiqua
  - - †Ypresiglaux michaeldanielsi
    - †Ypresiglaux gulottai
  - Owl crown group
    ⊞
    - Tyto alba (barn owl)
    - Strigidae
      - Surnia ulula (northern hawk-owl)
      - Ninox novaeseelandiae (morepork)
      - Strix aluco (tawny owl)
    ⊟

Topology 2: 50% majority-rule consensus tree

- Strigiformes
  - †Berruornis orbisantiqui
  - † Ogygoptynx wetmorei
  - - †Eostrix tsaganica
    - †Palaeoglaux artophoron
    - - †Primoptynx poliotauros
      - - †Oligostrix rupelensis
        - †Minerva antiqua
    - - †Ypresiglaux michaeldanielsi
      - †Ypresiglaux gulottai
      - Owl crown group
        ⊞
        - Tyto alba (barn owl)
        - Strigidae
          - Surnia ulula (northern hawk-owl)
          - Ninox novaeseelandiae (morepork)
          - Strix aluco (tawny owl)
        ⊟

== See also ==
- Paleobiota of the London Clay
