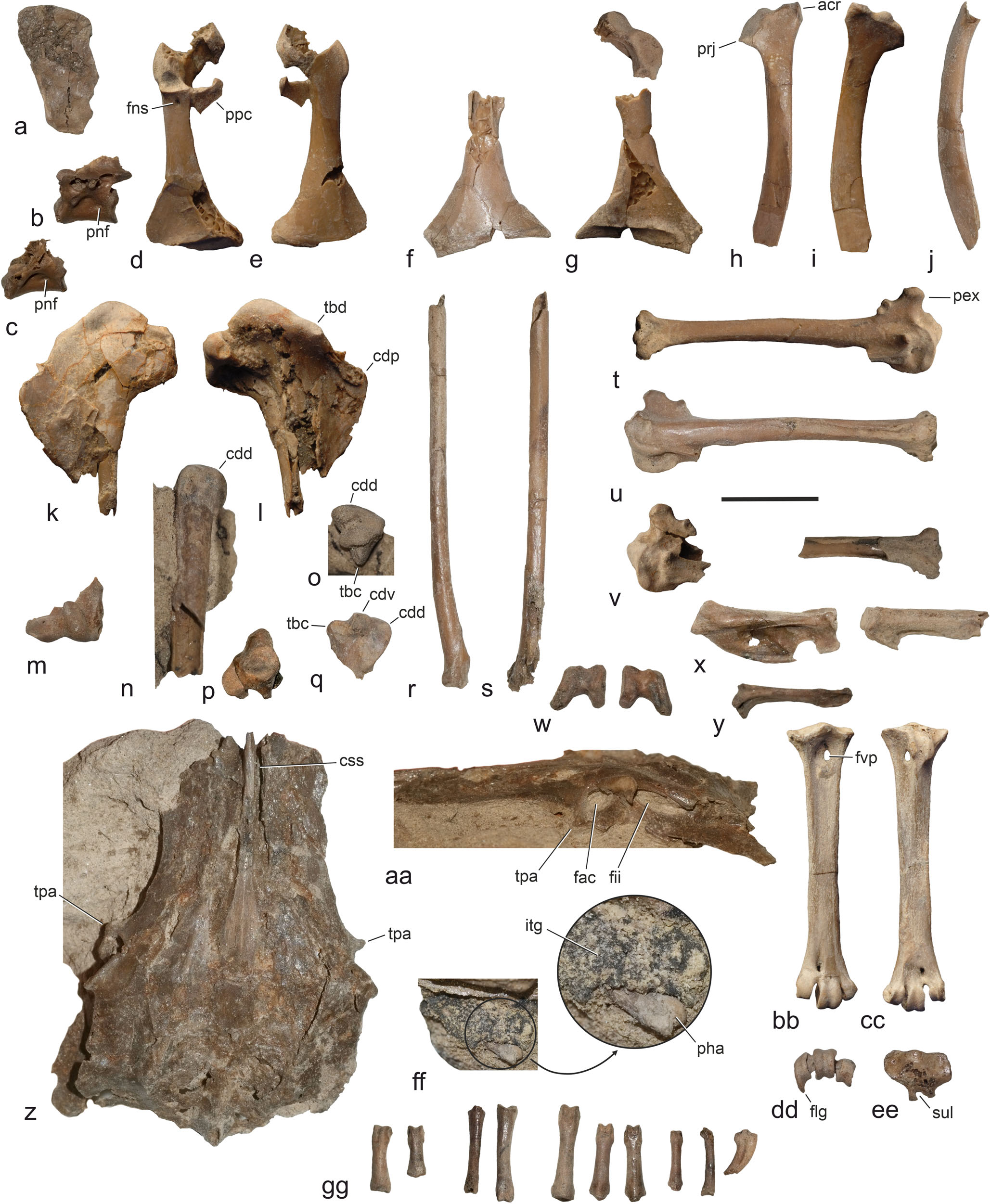
- Holotype fossil elements of Lutavis

Scientific classification
- Kingdom: Animalia
- Phylum: Chordata
- Class: Aves
- Clade: Telluraves
- Clade: Afroaves (?)
- Genus: †Lutavis; Mayr & Kitchener, 2022
- Species: †L. platypelvis

Binomial name
- †Lutavis platypelvis Mayr & Kitchener, 2022

= Lutavis =

Lutavis Temporal range: early Eocene, 54.6–55 Ma

Extinct genus of birds

Lutavis (meaning "clay bird") is an extinct genus of potentially afroavian bird from the Early Eocene London Clay Formation of Essex, United Kingdom. The genus contains a single species, L. platypelvis, known from a partial skeleton.

== Discovery and naming ==
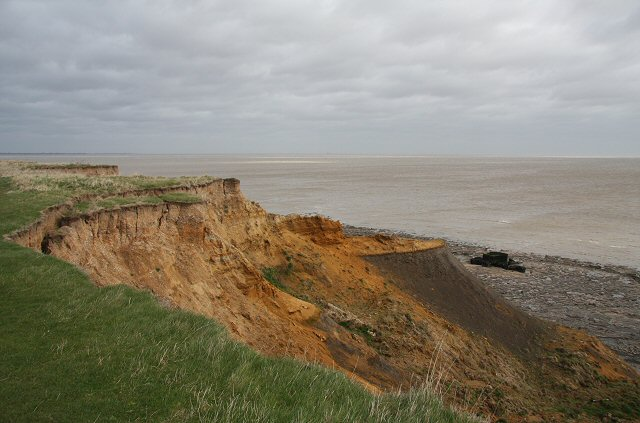
Cliffs near the type locality

The holotype specimen, NMS.Z.2021.40.37, was discovered in 1995 by Michael Daniels in layers of the London Clay Formation (Walton Member), dated to the early Ypresian, which is located near Walton-on-the-Naze in Essex, England. This specimen consists of some thoracic vertebrae, the pygostyle, the majority of the pectoral girdle, a partial right humerus, partial ulnae, partial carpometacarpi, carpal bones, wing phalanges, a partial pelvis, a right tarsometatarsus, and several pedal phalanges.

In 2022, German paleontologist Gerald Mayr and British zoologist Andrew C. Kitchener described Lutavis platypelvis, a new genus and species of bird, based on these fossil remains. The generic name, "Lutavis", combines the Latin words "lutum", meaning "mud" or "clay", in reference to the discovery of the fossil in the London Clay Formation, and "avis", meaning "bird". The specific name, "platypelvis", combines the Greek word "πλᾰτῠ́ς” (”platús”), meaning ”wide”, with “pelvis”, in reference to the taxon's wide, shallow pelvis.

== Description ==
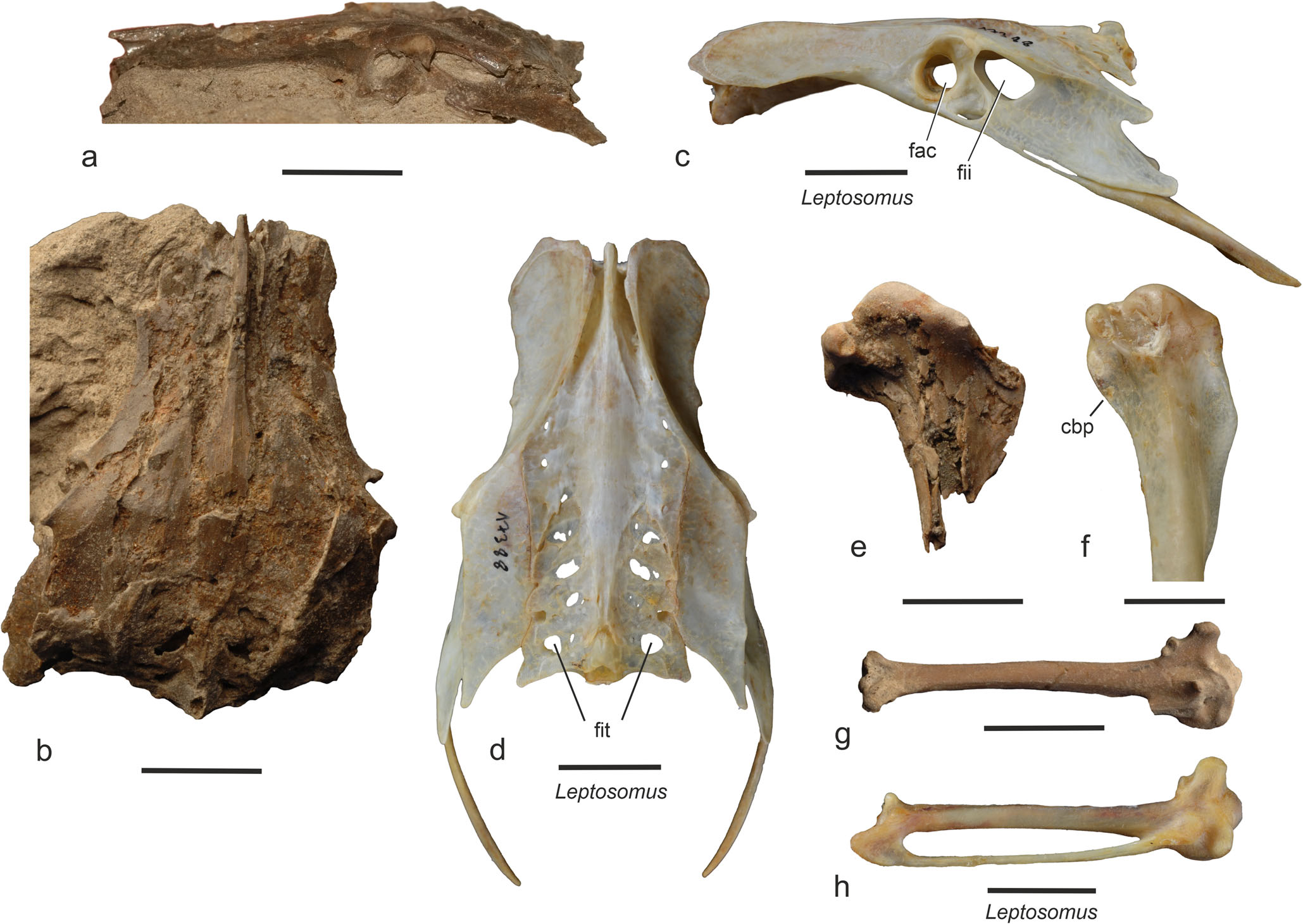
Fossil material of Lutavis compared to bones of the extant Leptosomus

Although the tarsometatarsus of Lutavis shares some similarities with those of the extinct Plesiocathartes and Paracrax, the remainder of the skeleton is significantly different, with very few similarities. Preserved fossilized toe pad integument was observed on a piece of matrix collected with a pedal phalanx. A similar instance was seen in the holotype of the contemporary Ypresiglaux michaeldanielsi.

Lutavis had relatively short legs compared to other birds. Although the tuberculum dorsale of the humerus is small (while it is large in extant birds capable of sudden take-offs), the coracoid is especially large, suggesting that Lutavis was capable of well-developed flight.

== Classification ==
Mayr and Kitchener (2022) could not confidently place Lutavis within any avian clade due to the lack of derived features in the holotype. They suggested that an assignment to the Leptosomiformes would be possible but highly speculative, and that future work should be done to establish a more confident placement.

== See also ==
- Paleobiota of the London Clay
