= Protostrigidae =

Protostrigidae Temporal range: Eocene–early Oligocene

Scientific classification
- Kingdom: Animalia
- Phylum: Chordata
- Class: Aves
- Order: Strigiformes
- Family: †Protostrigidae

Genera
- Eostrix; Masillastrix?; Minerva; Oligostrix

Extinct family of birds

Protostrigidae is a prehistoric family of owls which occurred in North America, Europe, and Asia during the Eocene and early Oligocene periods. The genera Eostrix, Minerva, and Oligostrix are generally placed in this family. In 1983, Cécile Mourer-Chauviré demonstrated that Protostrix is a junior synonym of Minerva. Primoptynx exhibits some protostrigid features, but lacks the specialized tibiotarsus anatomy of other members. The Messel owl Masillastrix was assigned to cf. Protostrigidae.

Protostrigidae characteristics include strong first and second toes as well as a widened medial condyle of the tibiotarsus.
