= Eptalofosuchus =

Eptalofosuchus Temporal range: Late Cretaceous, Late Cretaceous

Scientific classification
- Kingdom: Animalia
- Phylum: Chordata
- Class: Reptilia
- Clade: Pseudosuchia
- Clade: Crocodylomorpha
- Clade: †Notosuchia
- Genus: †Eptalofosuchus; Marinho et al., 2022
- Species: †E. viridi

Binomial name
- †Eptalofosuchus viridi Marinho et al., 2022

Genus of notosuchian

Eptalofosuchus is a genus of Notosuchian from the Uberaba Formation in Brazil, and contains one species, E. viridi.

== Description ==
The genus was described on the basis of a fragmentary mandible, which was found in the Uberaba Formation in the Bauru Group, of southeastern Brazil, which was said to be from an advanced Notosuchian.
