= Unquillosaurus =

Unquillosaurus Temporal range: Maastrichtian ~72 Ma

Scientific classification
- Kingdom: Animalia
- Phylum: Chordata
- Class: Reptilia
- Clade: Dinosauria
- Clade: Saurischia
- Clade: Theropoda
- Clade: Maniraptoriformes
- Clade: Maniraptora
- Genus: †Unquillosaurus; Powell, 1979
- Species: †U. ceibalii

Binomial name
- †Unquillosaurus ceibalii Powell, 1979

Extinct genus of dinosaurs

Unquillosaurus (meaning "Unquillo river lizard") is a genus of large theropod dinosaur from the Late Cretaceous Los Blanquitos Formation of Salta Province, Argentina. Its precise classification is uncertain, but most researchers consider it as a maniraptoran. The genus contains a single species, U. ceibalii, known only from a single fossilized pubis (a pelvic bone).

== Discovery and naming ==
The holotype, PVL 3670-11, was found at Arroyo-Morterito in the Los Blanquitos Formation, dating to the Maastrichtian. The specimen, which consists of a left pubis measuring 51.4 centimetres (1 ft 8.2 in) long, was re-studied by Fernando Novas and Federico Agnolin in 2004, who concluded that the orientation of the pubis had been misinterpreted: it pointed backwards, as was shown by the fossil still being attached to a displaced part of the pubic peduncle of the ilium.

The type species Unquillosaurus ceibalii was described by Jaime Eduardo Powell in 1979. The generic name, "Unquillosaurus," is derived from the river Unquillo and the Greek word, "sauros," meaning "lizard." The specific name, "ceibalii," refers to the town El Ceibal.

== Classification ==
Powell (1979) assigned Unquillosaurus as a theropod of uncertain taxonomic placement, regarding it as a member of the Carnosauria. In 2004, Novas and Agnolín concluded from the opisthopubic pelvic anatomy that Unquillosaurus was part of the Maniraptora or at least Maniraptoriformes, and likely closely related to either the Avialae or the bird-like Alvarezsauridae; perhaps it was itself a bird, a basal member of the Metornithes. In 2006, Martínez and Novas stated that Unquillosaurus probably belonged to the maniraptoran clade Dromaeosauridae. In 2012, however, Carrano and colleagues considered Unquillosaurus as a member of the Carcharodontosauridae, noting that the animal has many similarities to Giganotosaurus. In 2013, Agnolín and Novas interpreted Unquillosaurus as a very large averaptoran instead, suggesting that the distal pubis shows condition of a coelurosaur and different from that of a carnosaur. In a 2016 study about the phylogeny of theropods found in Argentina, Unquillosaurus is considered as a maniraptoran. As of 2021, no reliable records of carcharodontosaurids beyond the Turonian age were known. In 2024, the describers of Diuqin considered this taxon to be a possible member of the Unenlagiinae.

== Paleoecology ==
Unquillosaurus is known from the Los Blanquitos Formation. The abelisaurid theropod Guemesia is also known from this formation, as well as fossils of what may belong to a species of Titanosaurus.

== See also ==
- Timeline of dromaeosaurid research
