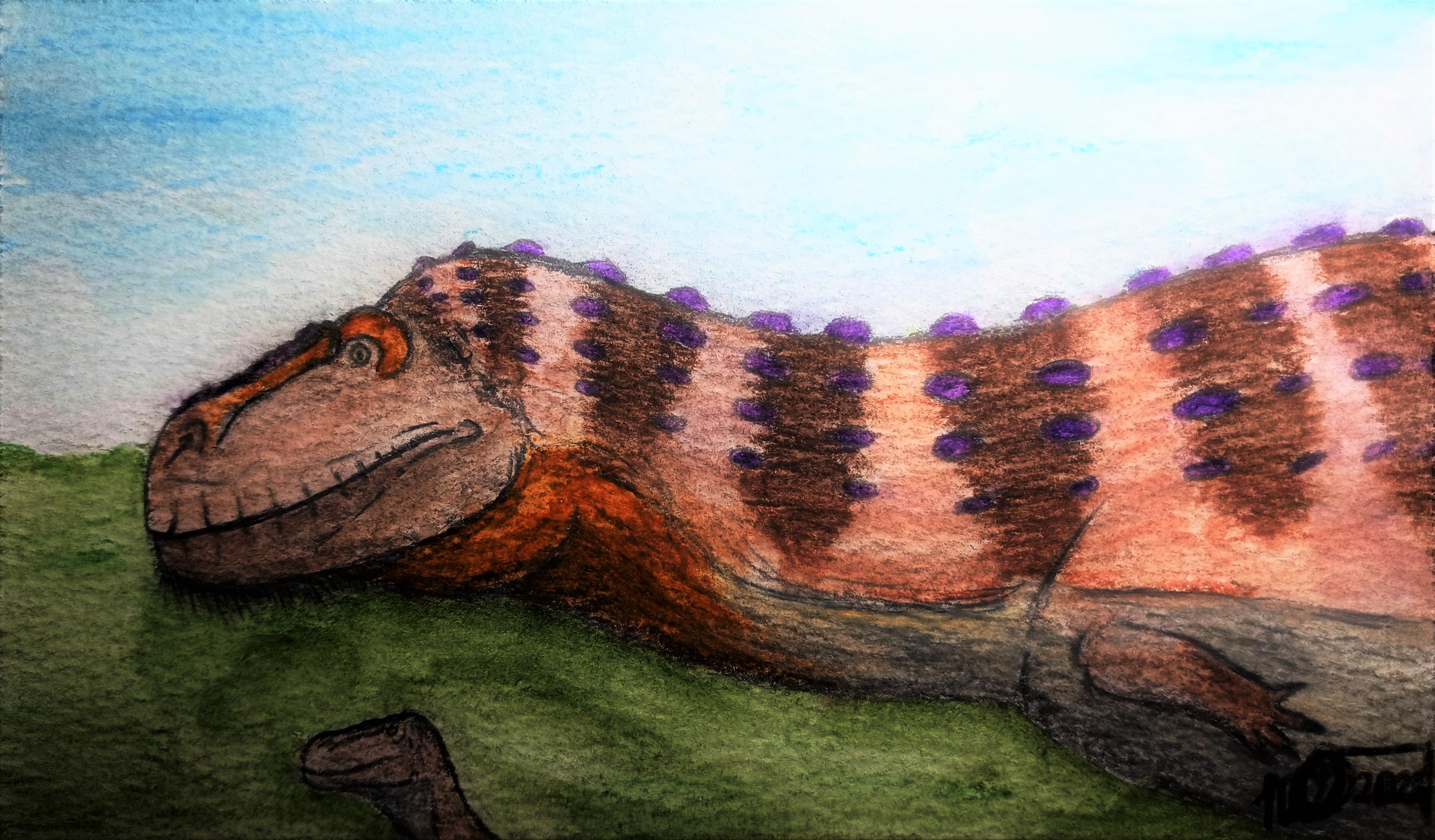
- Drawing of Guemesia ochoai

Scientific classification
- Kingdom: Animalia
- Phylum: Chordata
- Class: Reptilia
- Clade: Dinosauria
- Clade: Saurischia
- Clade: Theropoda
- Family: †Abelisauridae
- Genus: †Guemesia; Agnolín et al., 2022
- Species: †G. ochoai

Binomial name
- †Guemesia ochoai Agnolín et al., 2022

= Guemesia =

Guemesia Temporal range: Late Cretaceous ~72 Ma

Abelisaurid dinosaur genus from Late Cretaceous Argentina

Guemesia (named after Martín Miguel de Güemes, whose death bicentenary was in 2021) is a genus of abelisaurid dinosaur from the Late Cretaceous Los Blanquitos Formation of Salta Province, Argentina. The type and only species is Guemesia ochoai, known from a nearly complete braincase. It is one of the smallest abelisaurids currently known.

== Discovery ==
The holotype of Guemesia, IBIGEO-P 103, is a small, nearly complete braincase. It was found in the Los Blanquitos Formation, in the Amblayo Valley of Salta Province, Argentina. The specimen was described in 2022 by Agnolín et al. as belonging to a new genus and species of abelisaurid dinosaur, and the first dinosaur of its kind known from the area.

== Classification ==
Agnolín et al. place Guemesia as a derived abelisaurid within the clade Brachyrostra.

- Abelisauridae
  - Spectrovenator
  - - Rugops
    - - Viavenator
      - - Majungasaurinae
          - Rahiolisaurus
          - - Arcovenator
            - - Rajasaurus
              - Indosaurus
              - Majungasaurus
        - Brachyrostra
          - Skorpiovenator
          - Niebla
          - Llukalkan
          - Ilokelesia
          - Guemesia
          - Ekrixinatosaurus
          - - Carnotaurinae
              - Carnotaurus
              - - Aucasaurus
                - Abelisaurus

== Paleoecology ==
Guemesia is known from the Los Blanquitos Formation. The controversial tetanuran theropod Unquillosaurus is also known from this formation, as well as fossils of what may belong to a species of Titanosaurus.
