= Chishan Formation =

Geologic formation in China

- Stratigraphic range: Late Cretaceous
- Type: Geological formation
- Underlies: Taizhou Formation
- Overlies: Pukou Formation

Lithology
- Primary: Sandstone, Siltstone, Mudstone
- Other: Conglomerate, Diamictite

Location
- Region: Asia
- Country: China

The Chishan Formation a Late Cretaceous geologic formation in China. It is located in the Subei Basin, and records fossil eggs.

== Geology ==
The Subei Basin is a Cretaceous to Cenozoic rift basin that developed along the East Asian continental margin. It is bounded by the Tan-Lu Fault to the west, the Jiangnan Orogen to the south, and the Sulu Orogen to the north. The Upper Cretaceous sedimentary succession of the basin fill includes the Pukou, Chishan, and Taizhou Formation, from bottom to top. Analysis of ostracod, charophyta, and sporopollen assemblages have determined the age of these formations to be Cenomanian to Coniacian, Santonian to Campanian, and Maastrichtian respectively. The Chishan Formation is characterised by mixed fluvial-aeolian deposits, divided into lower and upper sections. The lower section comprises mostly purple-red sandstones, siltstones, and mudstones. The upper section comprises brick-red fine to coarse sandstones with subordinate very fine sandstones, siltstones, and mudstones.

== Environment ==
Associated Facies from the Chishan Formation include crescentic aeolian dune deposits with sinuous crests, wet interdune depressions subjected to fluvial floods, damp interdune where groundwater level reached the depositional surface, dry interdune, ephemeral fluvial channels, overbank flood deposits, and shallow lake to offshore settings.

=== Cryosphere ===
Differential compaction between sand dunes and wet interdune generated mud pebbles and cobbles. Anchor ice and ice floe were generated in the oases when winter temperatures dropped to −12 °C (10 °F). Strong desert winds cracked the ice floe on the oases surface leading to the formation of transverse fractures. These ice floes would then transport mud intraclasts derived from the oases margins. When temperatures increases, the melting of ice floes would releases the mud intraclasts as dropstones and diamictites to the oasis bottom. This active cryosphere prevailed under high elevations in which cryospheric processes were possible at lower latitudes. These processes were similar to those occurring in the Quaternary Badain Jaran Desert oases from China. A global cooling trend apexing in the Maastrichtian further promoted the development of an active cryosphere in the greenhouse Cretaceous period, supported as well by the discovery of striated cobbles of glacial origin in the Late Cretaceous Hekou Formation.

== Fossils ==
Fossils recorded in the Chishan Formation include ostracods, charophytes, and the Dinosaur eggs Oolethes alongatus.

== See also ==
- Hekou Formation
- List of Dinosaur-bearing rock formations
