= Oligostrix =

Scientific classification
- Kingdom: Animalia
- Phylum: Chordata
- Class: Aves
- Order: Strigiformes
- Family: †Protostrigidae
- Genus: †Oligostrix; Fischer, 1983
- Species: †O. rupelensis

Binomial name
- †Oligostrix rupelensis Fischer, 1983

Extinct genus of owl

Oligostrix is a genus of owls under the family Protostrigidae known from the fossil record. It contains the single species Oligostrix rupelensis.
