= Los Blanquitos Formation =

Geological formation in Argentina

- Stratigraphic range: Late Campanian - Early Maastrichtian; ~72 Ma
- Type: Geological formation
- Unit of: Salta Group
- Underlies: Lecho Formation
- Overlies: Las Curtiembres Formation

Lithology
- Primary: Sandstone

Location
- Coordinates: 24.3°S 65.3°W
- Approximate paleocoordinates: 27.6°S 47.5°W
- Region: Salta Province
- Country: Argentina
- Extent: Salta Basin
- Los Blanquitos Formation (Argentina)

The Los Blanquitos Formation is a geological formation in Salta Province, Argentina whose strata date back to the late Campanian to early Maastrichtian age of the Late Cretaceous Period. Dinosaur remains are among the fossils that have been recovered from the formation. The formation consists of friable, micaceous, grayish-red sandstones with quartz pebbles containing small carbonate veins. In the base of this layer the remains of a titanosaurid dinosaur were discovered. Above the layer with bones appears a lens of thick, greenish-gray, calcareous, very hard sandstone with pebbles and gravel. The bones were covered by a "halo" of the same rock but of greenish or grayish color, especially visible because the normal sediment is red. The bed thickness is 1.5 metres (4.9 ft).

== Vertebrate paleofauna ==
- Guemesia ochoai - an abelisaurid theropod dinosaur, known from a nearly complete braincase
- Unquillosaurus ceiballi - a theropod dinosaur (possibly carcharodontosaurian or Maniraptoran), known from a pubis
- ?Titanosaurus sp. - a sauropod dinosaur

== See also ==
- List of dinosaur-bearing rock formations
