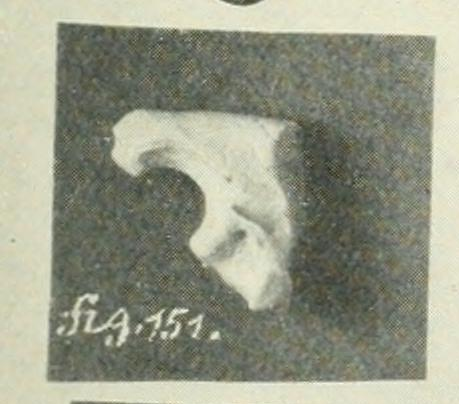
- Ungual phalanx fossil from Minerva antiqua

Scientific classification
- Kingdom: Animalia
- Phylum: Chordata
- Class: Aves
- Order: Strigiformes
- Family: †Protostrigidae
- Genus: †Minerva; Shufeldt, 1915

Species
- M. antiqua (Shufeldt, 1913); M. californiensis (Howard, 1965); M. leptosteus (Marsh, 1871); M. lydekkeri (Shufeldt, 1913); M. saurodosis Wetmore, 1921

Synonyms
- Protostrix Wetmore, 1933

= Minerva (bird) =

Minerva Temporal range: Eocene

Extinct genus of birds

Minerva is an extinct genus of owls in the prehistoric family Protostrigidae from the Eocene of North America. Described in 1915 by R. W. Shufeldt, some of the bones of Minerva were interpreted as belonging to an edentate mammal by Alexander Wetmore in 1933, who assigned the remaining bones to the new genus Protostrix. Analysis in 1983 re-established the genus Minerva was avian.
