= Eostrix =

Eostrix Temporal range: early Eocene

Scientific classification
- Kingdom: Animalia
- Phylum: Chordata
- Class: Aves
- Order: Strigiformes
- Family: †Protostrigidae
- Genus: †Eostrix; Brodkorb, 1971

Species
- E. mimica (Wetmore, 1938); E. martinellii Martin & Black, 1972; E. vincenti Harrison 1980; E. tsaganica Kurochkin& Dyke 2011

Genus of protostrigid owl

Eostrix is a genus of extinct primitive owls in the family Protostrigidae, along with Oligostrix and Minerva. These owls date from the early Eocene of the United States, Europe, and Mongolia. They have been described based on fossil remains. The genus was created by Pierce Brodkorb in 1971 to place a fossil species known until that time as Protostrix mimica.

The following species are recognised:

- E. mimica described in 1938 by Alexander Wetmore using hindlimb elements in Eocene strata in Wyoming.
- E. martinellii was described in 1972 from a left tarsometatarsus (lower leg bone) recovered from an escarpment above the southeastern bank of Cottonwood Creek in Fremont County, Wyoming by Jorge Martinelli on a field trip in 1970 under the auspices of the University of Kansas. The strata was a Lysite member of the Wind River Formation. Martinelli was studying paleontology at the University of Barcelona. Paleontologists Larry D. Martin and Craig Call Black from the University of Kansas Natural History Museum named it in his honour. The smaller of the two species, it was similar in size to the living long-eared owl (Asio otus). Differences in the trochleas (grooves) of the lower end of the tarsometatarsus set it apart from living owls, namely a groove in the trochlea for digit 2, a deeper posterior groove in a relatively narrow trochlea for digit 3, and an unusually rounded trochlea for digit 4.
- E. vincenti described in 1980 by Colin Harrison from the early Eocene London Clay in England, known from pedal phalanx and proximal tarsometatarsus bones. Some scholars think E. vincenti resembles Necrobyas more than Eostrix.
- E. tsaganica described in 2011 by Evgeny Kurochkin and Gareth J. Dyke, found in Mongolia.

In 2016, Gerald Mayr described E. gulottai from the early Eocene Nanjemoy Formation in Virginia. However, in 2022, Mayr, alongside Andrew C. Kitchener, moved 'E.' gulottai to the genus Ypresiglaux as the new combination Y. gulottai.
