= Plesiocathartes =

Plesiocathartes Temporal range: Eocene to Oligocene

Scientific classification
- Kingdom: Animalia
- Phylum: Chordata
- Class: Aves
- Order: Leptosomiformes
- Genus: †Plesiocathartes; Gaillard, 1908

Type species
- †P. europaeus Gaillard, 1908

Other species
- †P. gaillardi Crusafont & Villalta, 1955; †P. major Weidig, 2006; †P. insolitipes Mayr & Kitchener, 2022; †P. kelleri Mayr, 2002; †P. wyomingensis Weidig, 2006

Extinct genus of birds

Plesiocathartes is an extinct genus of birds that lived during the Eocene to Oligocene period. It currently presents 5 species from Europe and North America. It was originally described related to New World vultures, but recent studies have uncovered that the genus was more closely related to the cuckoo-roller from Madagascar.

== Distribution ==
P. insolitipes fossils are known from Walton-on-the-Naze, a site stratigraphically located in the Walton Member of the London Clay Formation of southeastern England.
