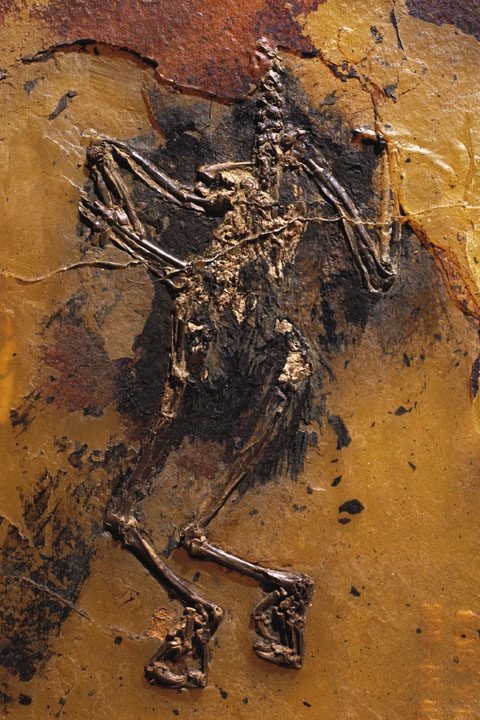
- Palaeoglaux artophoron

Scientific classification
- Kingdom: Animalia
- Phylum: Chordata
- Class: Aves
- Order: Strigiformes
- Family: †Palaeoglaucidae
- Genus: †Palaeoglaux; Mourer - Chauviré, 1987

Species
- P. perrierensis Mourer - Chauviré, 1987 (type); P. artophoron Peters, 1992

= Palaeoglaux =

Palaeoglaux Temporal range: Middle Eocene

Extinct genus of birds

Palaeoglaux is a genus of fossil owls from the Eocene epoch. The two known species are P. perrierensis from the Upper Eocene of Quercy, France, and P. artophoron from the Middle Eocene Messel shales, Germany. The holotype of P. perrierensis is a partial left coracoid in the Collection Université Montpellier, accession number PRR 2585. The four paratypes are the distal part of a left humerus (PRR2591), the proximal part of a left ulna (PRR 2571), the distal part of a left ulna (PRR 2578), and the distal part of a right tarsometatarsus (PRR 2576). The type specimen of P. artophoron is a fossil slab and counterslab containing most of the postcranial skeleton and some feather impressions. This specimen is in the collection of the Forschunginstitut Senckenberg, accession number SMF-ME 1144 A and B.

The feathers of P. artophoron show some unique characteristics. The feathers on the trunk are about 1 mm (0.039 in) wide and 2 cm (0.79 in) long. They appear to be membranous and ribbon-like, without barbs. This may be an artifact of preservation, but eight nearby primaries show barbs quite clearly. Peters noted that ribbon-like, elongated plumes are known from some living birds, but all are used in display. He wrote that display feathers are unexpected in a nocturnal owl and wondered if this lineage of owls was instead diurnal. Diurnal owls today include the burrowing owl, the northern hawk-owl and the snowy owl.

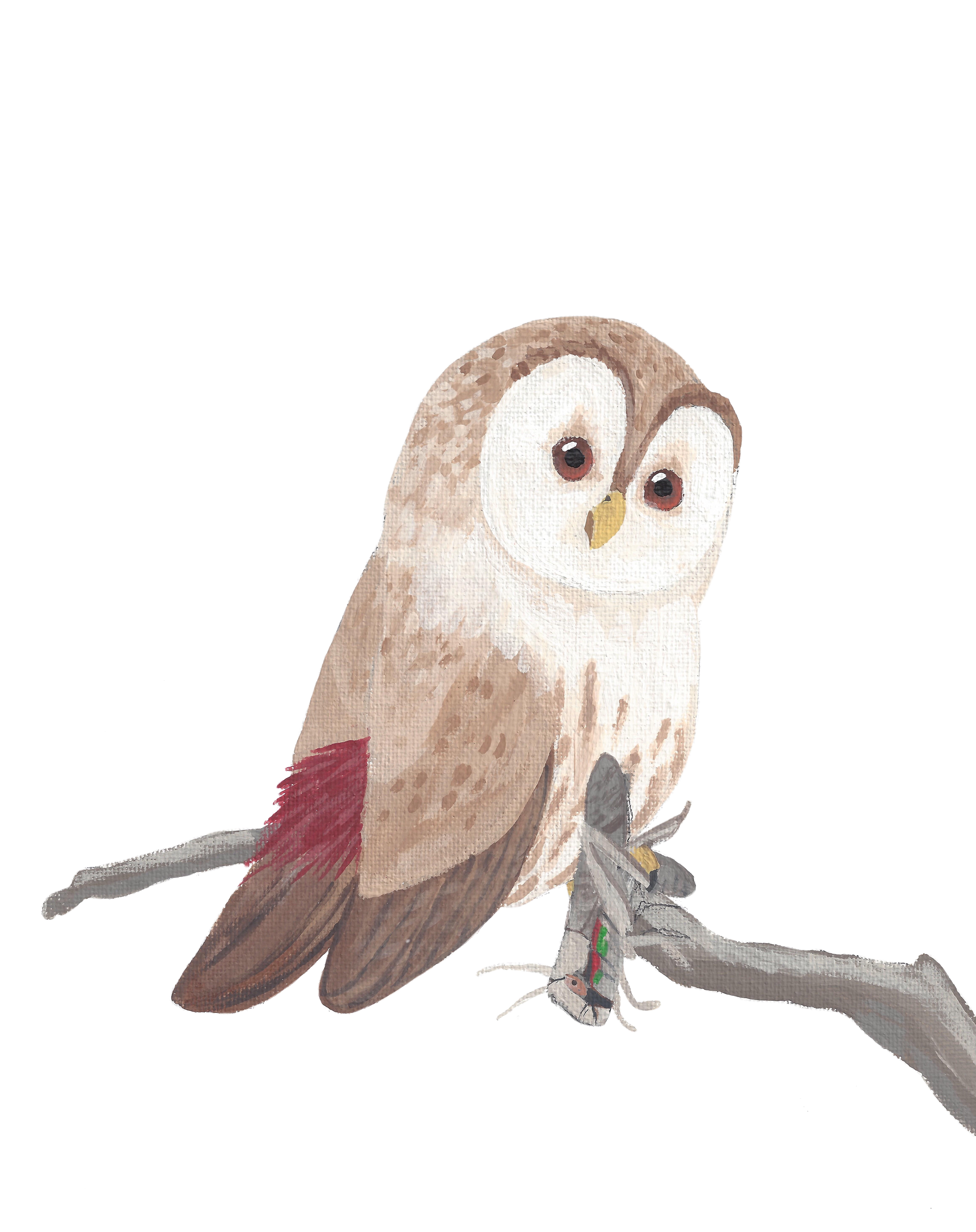
Life restoration of P. artophoron
