= Primoptynx =

Primoptynx Temporal range: Ypresian
- Skeleton of Primoptynx (A) compared to a snowy owl (B)

Scientific classification
- Kingdom: Animalia
- Phylum: Chordata
- Class: Aves
- Order: Strigiformes
- Genus: †Primoptynx; Mayr et al., 2020
- Species: †P. poliotauros

Binomial name
- †Primoptynx poliotauros Mayr et al., 2020

Extinct bird genus

Primoptynx is an extinct genus of early owl known from the Eocene (Ypresian age) Willwood Formation of Wyoming, United States. The genus contains a single species, Primoptynx poliotauros, known from a partial skeleton. This specimen was found in association with a fossil of the hooved mammal Diacodexis, and it was partially broken and displaced prior to its complete burial.
