= Sophiornis =

Sophiornis Temporal range: Palaeogene

Scientific classification
- Kingdom: Animalia
- Phylum: Chordata
- Class: Aves
- Order: Strigiformes (?)
- Family: Sophiornithidae
- Genus: †Sophiornis
- Species: †S. quercynus

Binomial name
- †Sophiornis quercynus Mourer-Chauviré, 1987

Extinct genus of birds

Sophiornis is an extinct genus of sophiornithid that lived during the Palaeogene period.

== Distribution ==
Sophiornis quercynus is known from the Quercy Phosphorites Formation of France.
