= Palaeotyto =

Palaeotyto Temporal range: Palaeogene

Scientific classification
- Kingdom: Animalia
- Phylum: Chordata
- Class: Aves
- Order: Strigiformes (?)
- Family: Sophiornithidae
- Genus: †Palaeotyto
- Species: †P. cadurcensis

Binomial name
- †Palaeotyto cadurcensis Mourer-Chauviré, 1987

Extinct genus of birds

Palaeotyto is an extinct genus of sophiornithid that lived during the Palaeogene period.

== Distribution ==
Palaeotyto cadurcensis is known from the Quercy Phosphorites Formation of France.
