= Ogygoptynx =

Ogygoptynx Temporal range: Late Paleocene

Scientific classification
- Kingdom: Animalia
- Phylum: Chordata
- Class: Aves
- Order: Strigiformes
- Family: †Ogygoptyngidae; Rich & Bohaska, 1976
- Genus: †Ogygoptynx; Rich & Bohaska, 1976
- Species: †O. wetmorei

Binomial name
- †Ogygoptynx wetmorei Rich & Bohaska, 1976

Extinct monotypic genus of owls

Ogygoptynx is an extinct monotypic genus of owls from the Paleocene of North America. Its only species is Ogygoptynx wetmorei and it is the only genus in the family Ogygoptyngidae. It is the earliest known owl fossil in the world.

== Taxonomy and systematics ==
The genus Ogygoptynx, its sole species, Ogygoptynx wetmorei, and the family Ogygoptyngidae, were all established by paleontologists Patricia Vickers Rich and David J. Bohaska in 1976, based on a single tarsometatarsus (ankle bone) recovered from Late Paleocene (Tiffanian) deposits in Colorado, USA.

The tarsometatarsus displays a mix of primitive and derived characters. It is elongate and slender, superficially resembling the condition in modern Tytonidae (barn owls).

== Significance ==
The existence of Ogygoptynx wetmorei poses an interesting puzzle in the early evolutionary history of owls. Its relatively "modern" ankle morphology, appearing in the Late Paleocene of North America, contrasts with the more "primitive" forms known from roughly contemporaneous deposits in Europe (e.g., Berruornis). Furthermore, similar advanced owls do not reappear in the North American fossil record until much later, creating a significant temporal gap.
