= Palaeobyas =

Palaeobyas Temporal range: Palaeogene

Scientific classification
- Kingdom: Animalia
- Phylum: Chordata
- Class: Aves
- Order: Strigiformes (?)
- Family: Sophiornithidae
- Genus: †Palaeobyas
- Species: †P. cracrafti

Binomial name
- †Palaeobyas cracrafti Mourer-Chauviré, 1987

Extinct genus of birds

Palaeobyas is an extinct genus of sophiornithid that lived during the Palaeogene period.

== Distribution ==
Palaeobyas cracrafti is known from the Quercy Phosphorites Formation of France.
