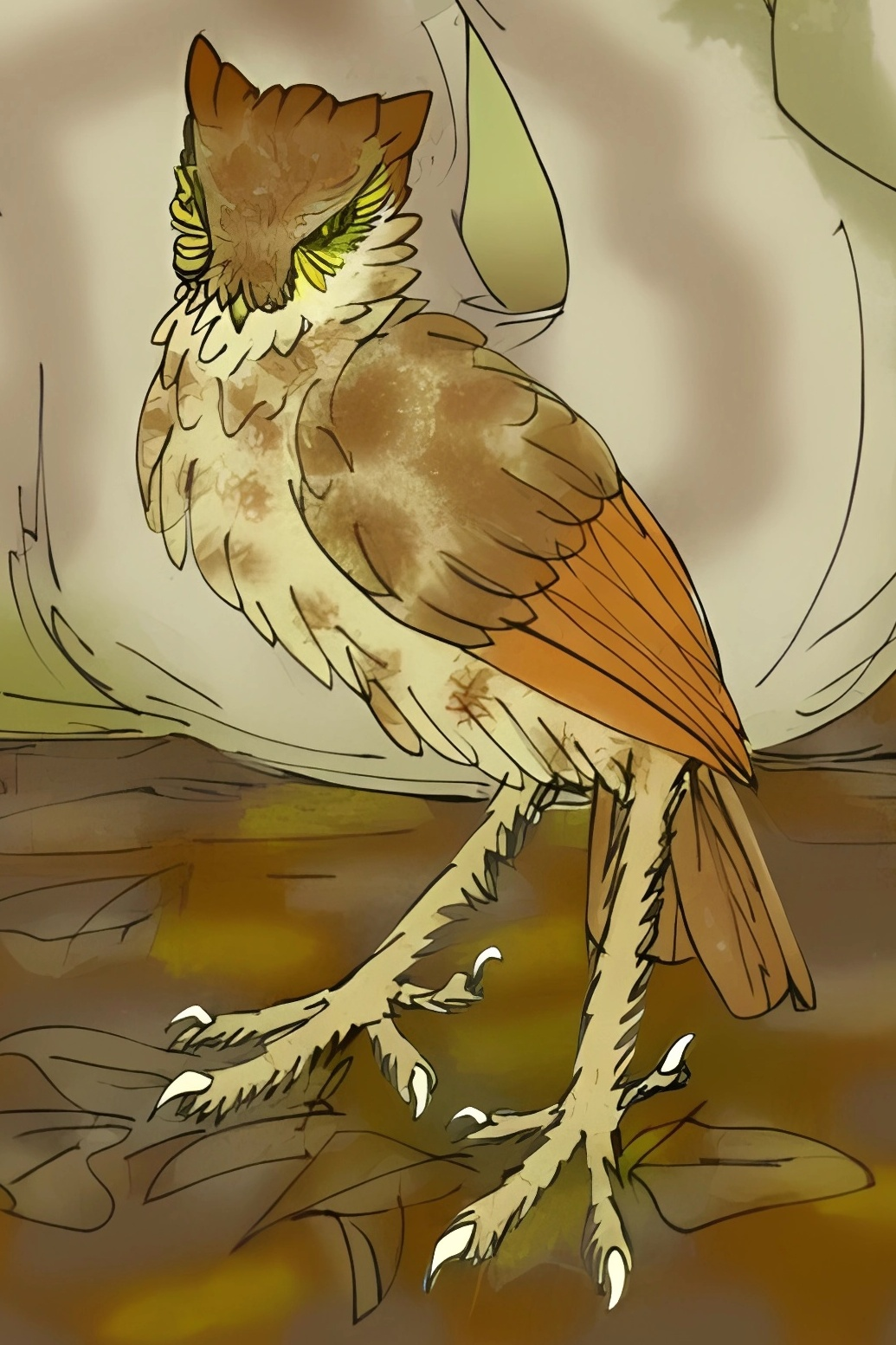
- Sophiornis quercynus

Scientific classification
- Kingdom: Animalia
- Phylum: Chordata
- Class: Aves
- Order: Strigiformes (?)
- Family: Sophiornithidae

Genera
- Sophiornis; and see text

= Sophiornithidae =

Sophiornithidae Temporal range: Paleocene-Eocene

Extinct family of birds

The Sophiornithidae (literally "wisdom birds") are an extinct family of chicken-sized predatory birds that lived from the Paleocene to the Eocene periods of the Cenozoic, and were found primarily in Europe, and are thought to be primitive owls (hence, the name wisdom bird). They were also possibly related to Strigiformes.

The French genera Berruornis (Late Paleocene to Late Eocene/Early Oligocene), as well as Palaeotyto and Palaeobyas from Quercy, are sometimes placed in this family. The latter might instead be barn owls, while the first might be a very basal owl but not an actual sophiornithid. Strigogyps was placed here for a time, but it has been revised several times since then and appears to be an ameghinornitid; these were distant relatives of the seriemas.
