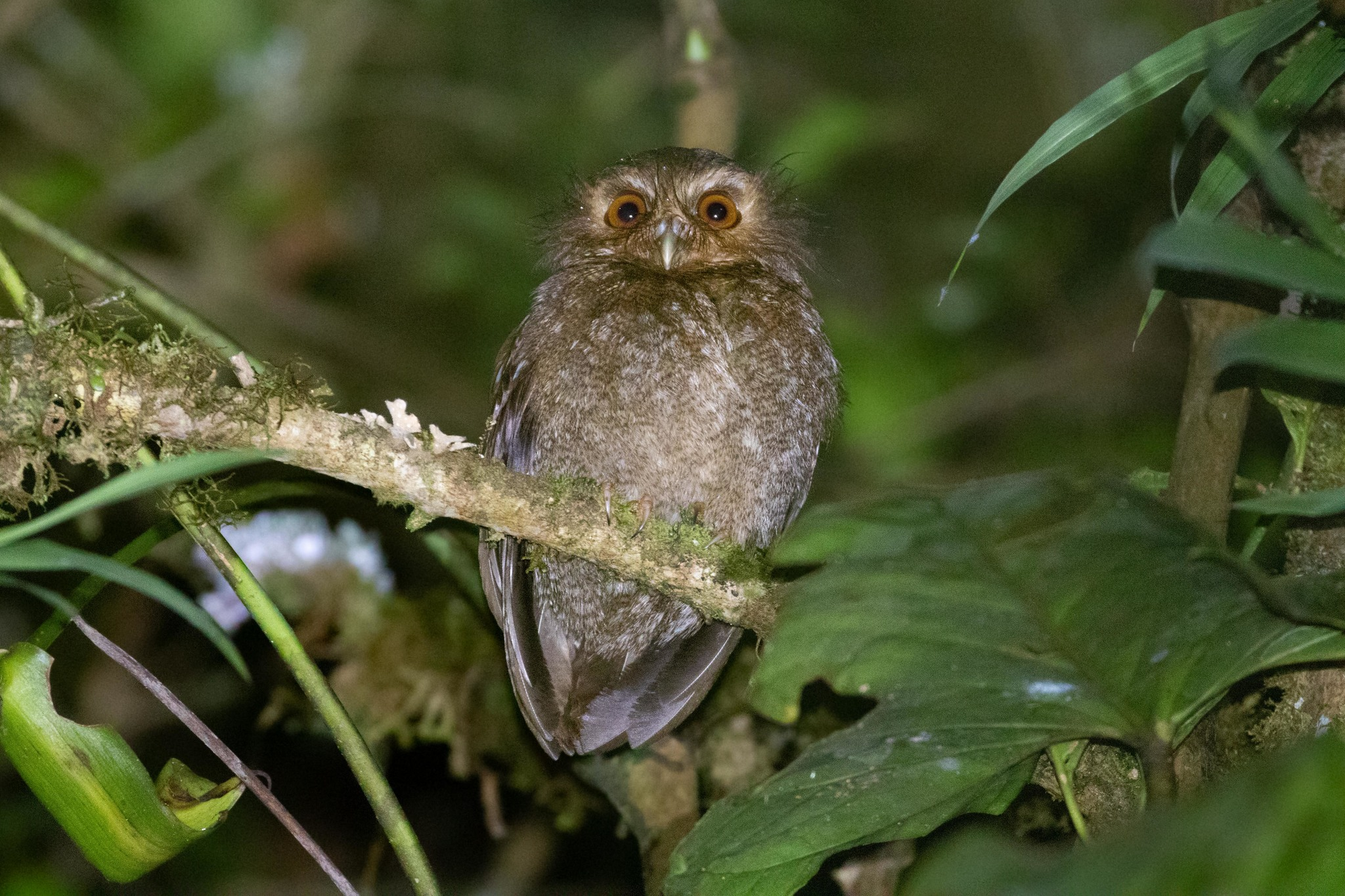

Conservation status
- Vulnerable (IUCN 3.1)
- CITES Appendix II

Scientific classification
- Kingdom: Animalia
- Phylum: Chordata
- Class: Aves
- Order: Strigiformes
- Family: Strigidae
- Genus: Xenoglaux; O'Neill & Graves, GR, 1977
- Species: X. loweryi

Binomial name
- Xenoglaux loweryi O'Neill & Graves, 1977

Audio
- Vocalization heard in Amazonas, Peru

= Long-whiskered owlet =

Species of owl

The long-whiskered owlet (Xenoglaux loweryi) is a vulnerable species of owl in subfamily Surniinae of the "typical owls", family Strigidae. It is endemic to a small area in Amazonas and San Martín departments of northern Peru.

== Taxonomy and systematics ==
The long-whiskered owlet was described in a 1977 paper from three specimens collected in August 1976. Though the species somewhat resembles several other small owls, the authors assigned it to a new genus, Xenoglaux, a combination of the Greek words xenos ("strange") and glaux ("owl"). They applied the specific epithet loweryi in recognition of George H. Lowery, Jr., for "his influence upon us and upon neotropical ornithology". A few more specimens were collected in succeeding years, and the bird was audio recorded after capture in a mist net in 2002. The first sighting in the wild was in 2007.

The original authors proposed that the long-whiskered owlet was most closely related to the owls of genus Glaucidium and somewhat more distantly to the North American elf owl (Micrathene whitneyi), "but generically clearly separable from both of these taxa". An extensive molecular phylogenetic study of the owls published in 2019 confirmed that the species' closest relatives are the elf owl and the collared owlet. At the time of that study the latter was named Glaucidium brodiei but the study also revealed that it did not belong in that genus. The study authors suggested restoring it to an earlier genus Taenioptynx and most taxonomic systems adopted the change.

The long-whiskered owlet is the only member of its genus and has no subspecies.

== Description ==
The long-whiskered owlet is one of the world's smallest owls. It is 13 to 14 cm (5.1 to 5.5 in) long; three individuals weighed an average of 48 g (1.7 oz). Only the heavier Tamaulipas pygmy owl and the lighter elf owl are of a similar diminutive length. The sexes are alike. Their face has a dull cinnamon brown ruff around the eyes and buffish white "eyebrows". The ruff's outer feathers are long and thin and project beyond the face, the feature which provides the species' English name. Their crown, nape, and upperparts are brown with tiny dull black bars. Their tail is dull brown. Their wing is mostly brown with some white spots; their primaries and primary coverts are black with variable amounts of pale brown and white. The lower part of their nape has large white spots and the sides of their neck have small whitish spots. Their throat is buffish white, their upper breast brown with tiny black bars, and the rest of their underparts brown with increasing amounts of white among the black which give a salt-and-pepper appearance. Their iris is amber, their bill greenish gray with a yellowish tip and pinkish gray cere, and their legs and feet pink.

== Distribution and habitat ==
The long-whiskered owlet is found in the Andes of northern Peru. All of the known locations are near the site where it was discovered, Abra Patricia (a pass on the border of Amazonas and San Martín departments) and further west in Amazonas at La Esperanza, in the Cordillera Colán, and in a few other sites. It inhabits humid montane forest and elfin forest. The original authors described the area at Abra Patricia as fog-shrouded and heavy with moss, bromeliads, epiphytes, and other vegetation above a forest floor with a thick layer of humus. It contained dense thickets of Chusquea bamboo, palms, and tree ferns. As of 2010 it was known at elevations between 1,900 and 2,400 m (6,200 and 7,900 ft); since then additional discoveries extended its upper limit to 2,600 m (8,500 ft). Lane and Angulo suspect that the species may be more widespread than known because similar habitat is found elsewhere in the general region, and they suggest extensive surveys be made in new areas.

== Behavior ==
=== Movement ===
The long-whiskered owlet is a year-round resident throughout its range.

=== Feeding ===
The long-whiskered owlet's diet and feeding behavior have not been described. However, one specimen's stomach contained insect remains.

=== Breeding ===
Nothing is definitely known about the long-whiskered owlet's breeding biology. Specimens collected between late July and October showed no physiological signs of active breeding, so it is hypothesized that the species breeds between November and June.

=== Vocalization ===
What is thought to be the long-whiskered owlet's primary song is "a single, slightly hoarse, hoot, rising then falling slightly in pitch: whoOOo...apparently given in a series of 4–6 notes/min." "It may also give a rapid, low-pitched trill, which is rarely heard."

== Status ==
The IUCN originally in 1988 assessed the long-whiskered owlet as near threatened, then in 2000 as endangered, and since 2020 as vulnerable. It is known from fewer than 15 sites within a restricted range and has an estimated population of between 250 and 1000 mature individuals. The population is believed to be stable. The principle threat is clearance of its habitat for timber, agriculture, and mining though as of 2018 "[h]abitat loss within the range has however been negligible over the past ten years, not causing any population declines". Lane and Angulo "suspect that the heart of the distribution of the Long-whiskered Owlet is likely to be protected...by the Aguaruna [indigenous community] and the sheer inhospitable geography" of the area. Several private protected areas such as Copallin, Hierba Buena-Allpayacu, and Abra Patricia-Alto Nieva have records of the species. The American Bird Conservancy and its Peruvian partner Asociación Ecosistemas Andinos (ECOAN) established the Abra Patricia Reserve in 2005 to protect the owlet and other threatened species of birds and mammals.
