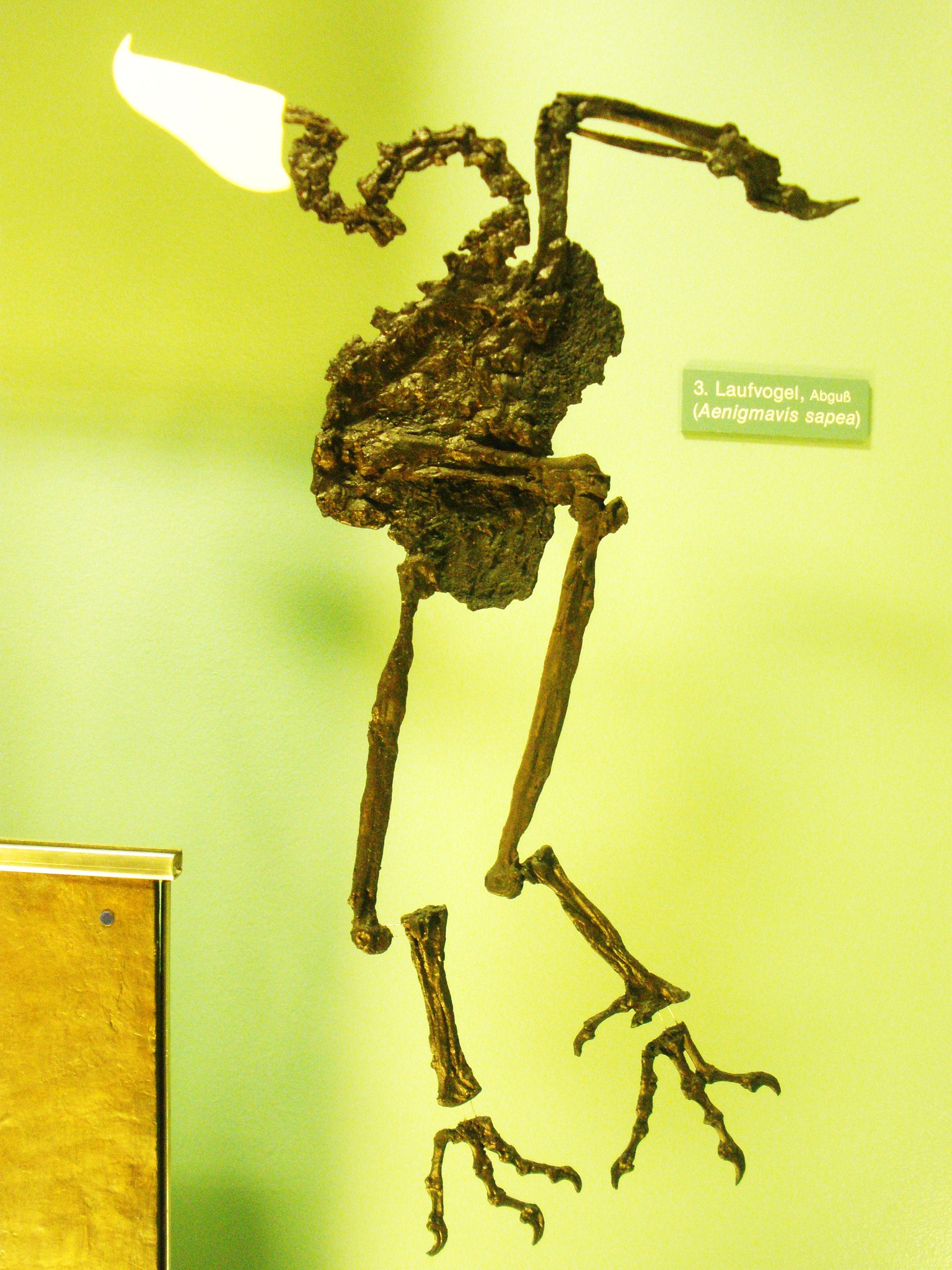
- Strigogyps sapea fossil.

Scientific classification
- Domain: Eukaryota
- Kingdom: Animalia
- Phylum: Chordata
- Class: Aves
- Order: Cariamiformes
- Family: Ameghinornithidae
- Genus: †Strigogyps; Gaillard, 1908

Type species
- Strigogyps dubius Gaillard, 1908

Other species
- S. robustus (Lambrecht, 1935) (originally Eocathartes/Geiseloceros robustus); S. sapea (Peters, 1987) (originally Aenigmavis sapea)

Synonyms
- Aenigmavis Peters, 1987; Ameghinornis Mourer-Chauviré, 1981; Eocathartes Lambrecht, 1935; Geiseloceros Lambrecht, 1935

= Strigogyps =

Strigogyps Temporal range: Middle Eocene to Early Oligocene

Extinct genus of birds in the familie Ameghinornithidae

Strigogyps is an extinct genus of prehistoric bird from the Middle Eocene to Early Oligocene of France and Germany. It was probably around the size of a large chicken or a guan, weighing not quite 1 kilogram (2.2 lb). Apparently, as indicated by the ratio of lengths of wing to leg bones, S. sapea was flightless. Its legs were not adapted to running, so it seems to have had a walking lifestyle similar to trumpeters. Unlike other Cariamiformes which appear to have been mostly carnivorous, the specimens of one species, Strigogyps sapea, suggest a facultatively herbivorous or omnivorous diet.

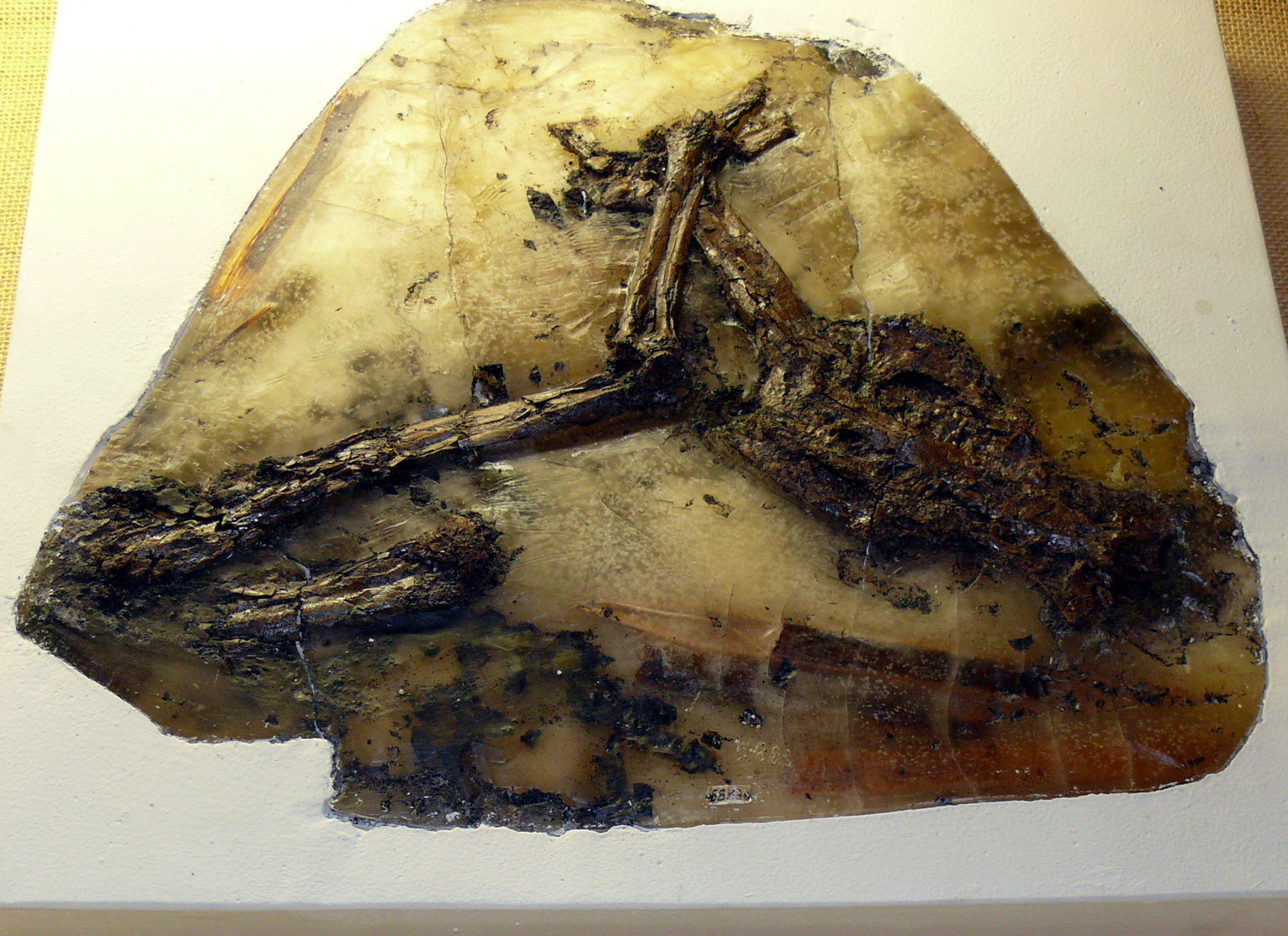
S. robustus

The type species of Strigogyps is S. dubius, which was described by Gaillard in 1908. It was initially placed in the owl order Strigiformes and considered to be a sophiornithid. S. dubius is based on a single tibiotarsus from the Late Eocene to Early Oligocene Quercy phosphorites of France. This tibiotarsus was destroyed in World War II during the bombing of Munich, but casts remain. In 1939, Gaillard described a second species of Strigogyps, S. minor, based on a humerus, two coracoids, and two carpometacarpi, also from Quercy. In 1981, Mourer-Chauviré redescribed S. minor as Ameghinornis minor, the only member of the new phorusrhacid subfamily, Ameghinornithinae. Ameghinornis was later placed in its own family, Ameghinornithidae. In 1987, Peters named another monospecific genus of ameghinornithid, Aenigmavis sapea, based on a nearly complete skeleton from the Middle Eocene Messel pit of Germany. Mayr (2005) found Aenigmavis to be a species of Strigogyps, S. sapea, and found Ameghinornis to be synonymous with S. dubius, as they both came from Quercy, and are almost identical except for coracoids and carpometacarpi of Ameghinornis, which Mayr found to be unlike other ameghinornithids, and probably from an idiornithid.

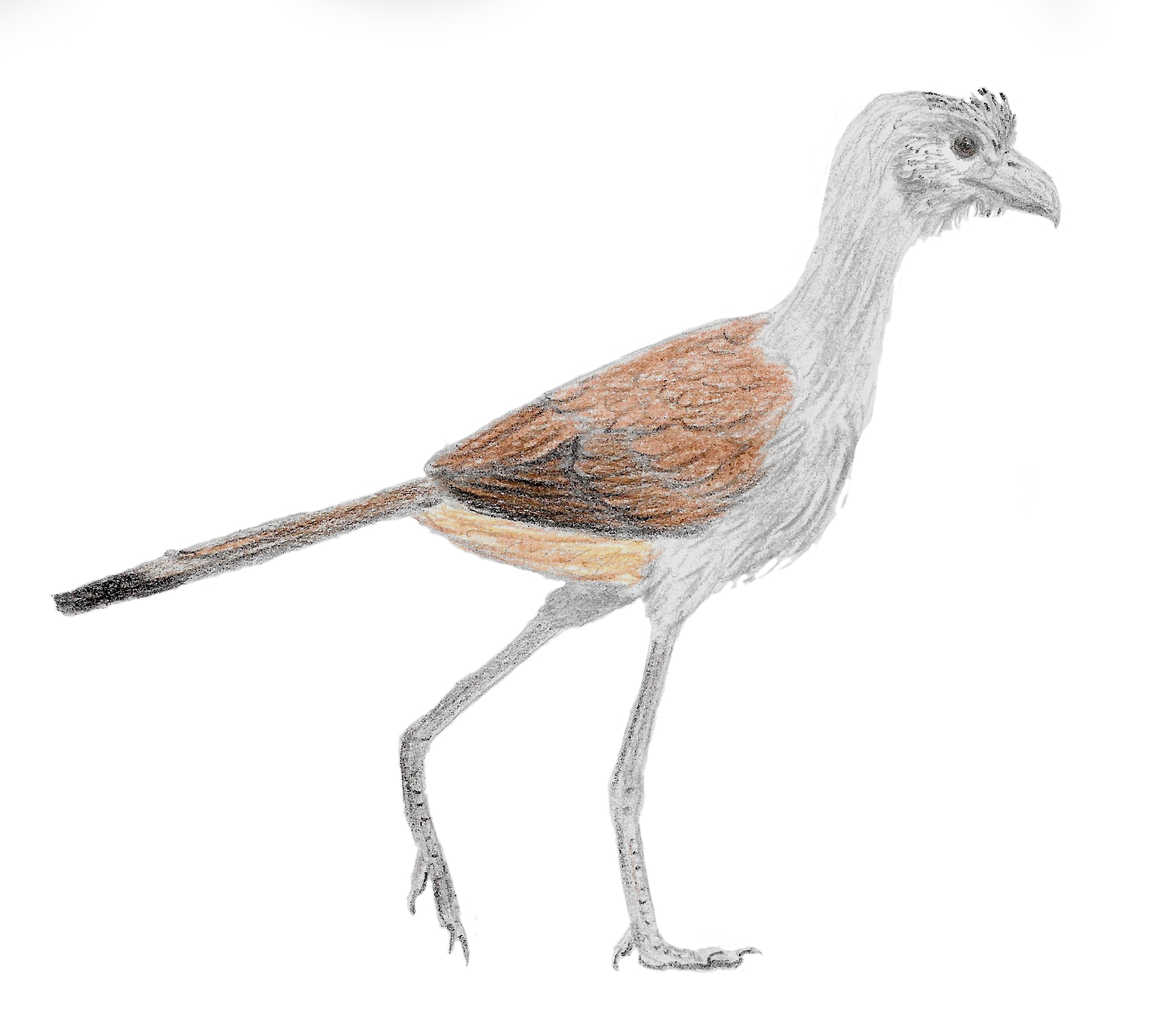
Life restoration. The head shape and size is speculative, based on seriemas and phorhusrhacids.

In 1935, Lambrecht described a new New World vulture, Eocathartes robustus, and a hornbill, Geiseloceros robustus, from the Middle Eocene (Lutetian) of the Geisel Valley of Germany. Each was based on a single specimen, and they were found very close together. Mayr (2007) found them to be synonymous and a species of Strigogyps, S. robustus.

Recent studies (Alvarenga and Höfling 2003, Mayr 2005) have found Strigogyps to be a more basal member of Cariamae, and not particularly close to the phorusrhachids. Salmila robusta, another bird from Messel was found to be more basal than Strigogyps, and the clade composed of Salmila and Cariamae to be the sister taxon to Psophiidae within a monophyletic Gruiformes.

Fragmentary remains from the Palaeocene and/or Eocene of England and North America have also been suggested to be phorusrhachids, but, like Strigogyps, they probably are not.

== See also ==
- List of fossil birds
