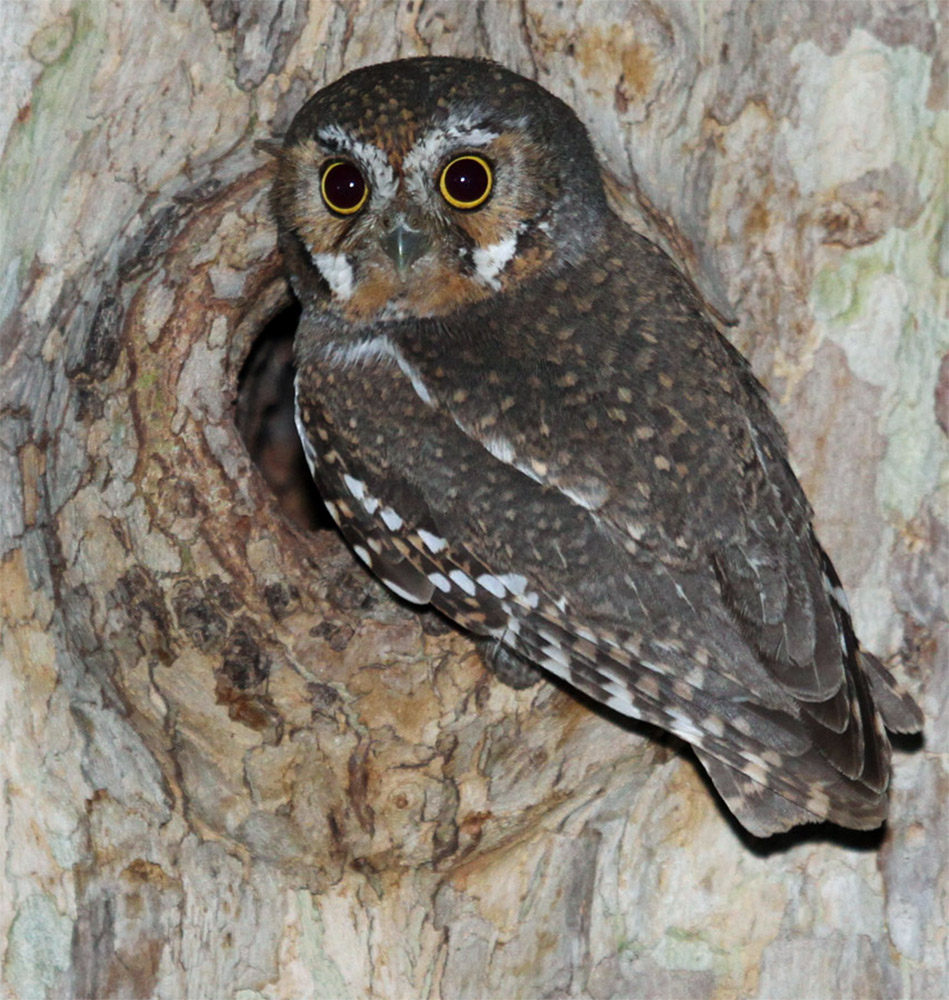

Conservation status
- Least Concern (IUCN 3.1)
- CITES Appendix II

Scientific classification
- Kingdom: Animalia
- Phylum: Chordata
- Class: Aves
- Order: Strigiformes
- Family: Strigidae
- Genus: Micrathene; Coues, 1866
- Species: M. whitneyi

Binomial name
- Micrathene whitneyi (J. G. Cooper, 1861)
- Breeding Non-breeding Year-round Migration

= Elf owl =

Species of owl

The elf owl (Micrathene whitneyi) is a small grayish-brown owl about the size of a sparrow found in the Southwestern United States, central Mexico, and the Baja California peninsula. It has pale yellow eyes highlighted by thin white "eyebrows" and a gray bill with a horn-colored tip. The elf owl frequently inhabits woodpecker holes in saguaro cacti; it also nests in natural tree cavities. It is nocturnal and feeds primarily on insects.

== Taxonomy ==
The elf owl was formally described in 1861 by the American naturalist James Graham Cooper from a specimen collected near Fort Mohave in Arizona. He coined the binomial name Athene whitneyi, choosing the specific epithet to honour the geologist Josiah Whitney. The owl is now the only species placed in the genus Micrathene that was introduced in 1866 specifically for the elf owl by American ornithologist Elliott Coues. The genus name combines the Ancient Greek mikros meaning "small" and the genus name Athene that had been introduced by Friedrich Boie in 1822.

A molecular phylogenetic study of the owls published in 2019 found that the elf owl is a sister species to the South American long-whiskered owlet (Xenoglaux loweryi) that was first described in 1977.

Four subspecies are recognized:

- M. w. whitneyi (Cooper, JG, 1861) – southwest US and northwest Mexico
- M. w. idonea (Ridgway, 1914) – south Texas (US) to central Mexico
- M. w. sanfordi (Ridgway, 1914) – south Baja California (Mexico)
- † M. w. graysoni Ridgway, 1886 – Socorro Island (off west Mexico) (extinct)

M. w. idonea, the subspecies in southernmost Texas to central Mexico, is resident, as are the isolated M. w. sanfordi of southernmost Baja California and M. w. graysoni (Socorro elf owl) of Socorro Island, southwest from the tip of Baja California. The Socorro elf owl has not been recorded since 1931 and is assumed to be extinct.

== Description ==
The elf owl is the world's smallest and lightest owl, although the long-whiskered owlet and the Tamaulipas pygmy owl are of a similarly diminutive length. The mean body weight of this species is 40 g (1.4 oz). These tiny owls are 12.5 to 14.5 cm (4.9 to 5.7 in) long and have a wingspan of about 27 cm (10.5 in). Their primary projection (flight feather) extends nearly past their tail. They have fairly long legs and often appear bow-legged.

They are often found in chaparral and are easily found during their breeding season. During dusk and just before dawn are the times this owl is most active when they can often be heard calling to one another in a high-pitched whinny or chuckle. These songs often consist of 5–7 notes that repeat in short duration, similar to the sound of a young puppy. The distinctive vocalizations of elf owls vary according to sex, with males exhibiting a wider repertoire of complex notes as opposed to females of the same species. Males have two primary classifications of songs, each of which share similar characteristics of structure and function. Most avian observers refer to "Class A" songs to describe those that vary in length (generally 5–15 notes) and are used as both territorial proclamation and to herald the arrival of males to females in the area. While Class A tones reflect changes in environmental factors – wind, precipitation, moonlight, and temperature – Class B songs have significantly less variation among individuals. Class B functions as the primary mating call, stimulating females and encouraging them to accept male sexual advances. As the season goes on and mating begins, Class A songs are observed with lower frequency than Class B. There is also a handful of locational, so-called "scolding", and territorial songs belonging to both male and female birds of the elf owl species.

== Distribution and habitat ==
The elf owl is known to migrate in large groups, with patterns of migration varying depending on flock and habitat location. Some broods of elf owl migrate to the southwest United States (California, Arizona, New Mexico, and Texas) in the spring and summer for breeding. In the winter, it is found in central and southern Mexico. Migrant elf owls return north in mid-April to early May. Resident populations occur in a couple of places in south central Mexico and along the Baja peninsula.

== Behaviour and ecology ==
Elf owls feign death when handled, an adaption that encourages a predator to relax its grip so that the owl can escape. Elf owls are also notoriously territorial. Territories are established by the male and are defended by both the male and the female, and males also tend to view their chosen female mate as a territory to be defended, as well. This defense is often accomplished through the use of song. During the breeding season, elf owls are monogamous and stay in breeding pairs, but can be found in small groups during migration and when mobbing predators. Adults as well as young can be subject to predation by other predatory birds such as jays, hawks, and owls.

=== Breeding ===
Elf owls usually choose abandoned, north-facing woodpecker cavities in saguaro cacti, sycamores, cottonwoods, and other hardwood trees, to raise their young. While some cavity nesters utilize vegetation as nesting substrate, elf owls have been observed removing this vegetation and prefer a bare cavity. While elf owls primarily use natural structures for their nesting, they have been known to nest in man-made structures such as telephone poles in urban areas.

They generally mate for periods of three months, with male and female birds remaining in close proximity. During this time, females engage in the singing of locational calls (see Description for more information on elf owl vocalizations), and males respond with mating rituals of their own. Males and female forage independently during this time, but the male elf owl will often hunt for the female as she remains in the pairs' chosen habitat for the mating season.

While three eggs is a very common clutch size, females may lay anywhere from one to five eggs in springtime (late March to early May). The eggs are usually round or oval shaped with a white coloration and are from 26.8 x 23.2 to 29.9 x 25.0 mm in size. The eggs are incubated for about 24 days before the chicks hatch. The young owlets fledge at about 10 weeks. Usually, chicks are born in mid-June or early July. By the end of July, they are almost always fledged and ready to set out on their own.

After the young hatch, the female elf owl watches over them in the nesting cavity while the male often hunts for the young and the female herself. The male elf owl does most of the caretaking himself, feeding his brood independent of the female, who resides in the cavity. Generally this period of communal rearing lasts until the brood is 17 to 21 days of age.

Elf owls live 3 to 6 years; in captivity they may live up to 10 years. The most common types of mortality for these owls are predation, exposure, and inter-species as well as intra-species competition.

=== Food and feeding ===
Hunting is performed mostly during nocturnal hours. Straight line flight is often deployed for this purpose but they will use an arced flight when in the vicinity of the nest and for flying to and from perches. They live in cacti much like some other birds, using the shade and climate the cacti provide.

Elf owls feed mainly on arthropods such as moths, crickets, scorpions, centipedes, and beetles. Agaves and ocotillos are ideal places for foraging, as moths and other insects may be found in their flowers. In urban areas they can be seen utilizing outdoor lights that attract bugs as areas for insect hunting. They are often seen chasing after flying insects, with a flight similar to a tyrant flycatcher's. They also feed on scorpions. Once the owl has killed the scorpion, they can be observed removing the stinger before consumption. The elf owls seem to not be bothered by scorpion stings. They will also feed on small mammals (such as kangaroo rats), reptiles (spiny lizards, earless lizards and blind snakes) and birds, on occasion.

== Conservation status ==
Populations of elf owls have continued to decline in recent years due to a continued loss of native habitats, particularly those in the desert areas of California. Human activities, like increasing water diversion and home construction, have decimated these desert and riparian areas, as well as increasingly abundant invasive species (such as the salt cedar). The destruction of habitat leaves many elf owls unable to nest, hunt, and reproduce in areas like California, Arizona, and elsewhere.

To date, elf owls are not considered a globally threatened species, yet they are listed as "endangered" in California due to a population of fewer than 150,000 individual owls in the United States. California has implemented a captive breeding program in an attempt to increase this number, while numerous environmental and government agencies work to preserve their riparian and desert homes. Some sources report that the elf owl has already been nearly eliminated in California.

== In fiction ==
An elf owl named Gylfie is a major character in the Guardians of Ga'Hoole book series by Kathryn Lasky, and the 2010 film adaptation.

== General references ==
- Biondo, Sam (2013). The Elf Owl and Imagined Amenities (Kindle ed.). ASIN B00FY5491W.
- del Hoyo, Josep (ed.) (2014). Handbook of the Birds of the World Vol. 5: Barn-owls to Hummingbirds. Barcelona: Lynx Ed. ISBN 84-87334-25-3.
- National Geographic (2002). Field Guide to the Birds of North America, 4th ed. ISBN 0-7922-6877-6.
- Sibley, David Allen (2014). The Sibley Guide to Birds, 2nd ed. New York: Knopf. ISBN 0-679-45122-6.
