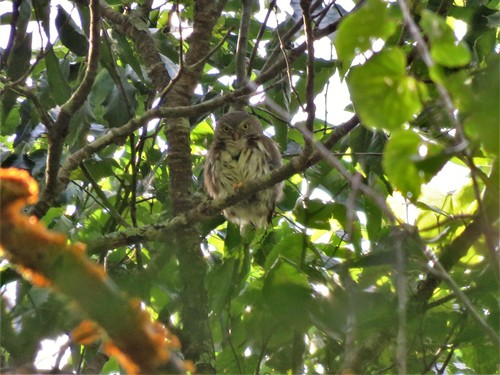

Conservation status
- Near Threatened (IUCN 3.1)
- CITES Appendix II

Scientific classification
- Kingdom: Animalia
- Phylum: Chordata
- Class: Aves
- Order: Strigiformes
- Family: Strigidae
- Genus: Glaucidium
- Species: G. sanchezi

Binomial name
- Glaucidium sanchezi Lowery & Newman, RJ, 1949
- Distribution of Tamaulipas pygmy owl Resident

= Tamaulipas pygmy owl =

Species of owl

The Tamaulipas pygmy owl (Glaucidium sanchezi) is a species of owl in the family Strigidae. It is endemic to Mexico. This is one of the smallest owls in the world, with a mean length of 13.5 cm (5.3 in). However, at 53 g (1.9 oz), it is slightly heavier than the long-whiskered owlet and the elf owl. Its natural habitat is subtropical or tropical moist montane forests.

== Description ==
The adult Tamaulipas pygmy owl has a length of between 13 and 16 cm (5.1 and 6.3 in) with a relatively long tail of between 5.1 and 5.7 cm (2.0 and 2.2 in). Their average weight is 53 g (1.9 oz), the male generally being lighter than the female. The male has a brownish facial disc flecked with white and short white eyebrows. The upper parts are olive-brown, with a greyer crown and fine white speckling at the front and sides of the crown. The main wing and tail feathers are barred in white. The underparts are whitish with some reddish-brown streaking and mottling. The legs are feathered, the bill is yellowish-brown and the eyes are yellow. The female is similar but has an overall more reddish-brown appearance.

== Distribution ==
The Tamaulipas pygmy owl is endemic to Mexico where it is only found in the mountains of northeastern Mexico, in the northern part of the state of Hidalgo and the southeastern part of the state of San Luis Potosí. Its habitat is moist evergreen forest, montane forest and cloud forest at altitudes between about 900 and 2,100 m (3,000 and 6,900 ft).

== Ecology ==
This owl is partly diurnal and feeds on insects and small vertebrates such as lizards. Little is known of its breeding habits but it generally chooses a hole in a tree previously used by a woodpecker. A clutch of up to four white eggs is laid and the young are able to fly soon after they emerge from the nest.

== Status ==
At one time the International Union for Conservation of Nature rated the conservation status of the Tamaulipas pygmy owl as "least concern" but this has now been changed to "near-threatened". The forests in which this owl lives are being logged and the bird's range is now thought to be smaller than it was in the past. The population is also thought to be declining and is estimated to be fewer than 50,000 birds.
