= Berruornis =

Berruornis Temporal range: Paleocene–Eocene

Scientific classification
- Kingdom: Animalia
- Phylum: Chordata
- Class: Aves
- Order: Strigiformes (?)
- Family: Sophiornithidae
- Genus: †Berruornis; Mourer-Chauviré, 1994
- Species: †B. orbisantiqui

Binomial name
- †Berruornis orbisantiqui Mourer-Chauviré, 1994

Extinct bird genus

Berruornis is an early fossil genus of owl or owl-like bird recovered from late Paleocene deposits in the region of Reims in northeastern France. It was about the size of a Eurasian eagle-owl (Bubo bubo). The genus contains a single species, Berruornis orbisantiqui.
