= Qiupa Formation =

Geological formation in Henan, China

- Stratigraphic range: Maastrichtian; ~72–66 Ma
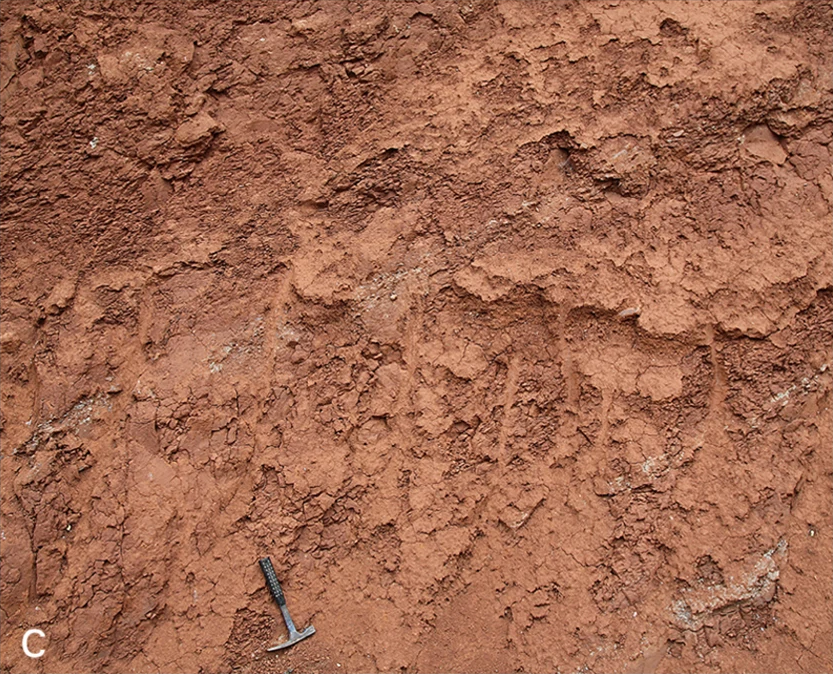
- Characteristic red brownish siltstones of the Qiupa Formation
- Type: Geological formation
- Unit of: Tantou Group
- Underlies: Gaoyugou Formation
- Overlies: Shitaijie Formation

Lithology
- Primary: Mudstone, siltstone
- Other: Sandstone, conglomerate

Location
- Coordinates: 33.9°N 111.8°E
- Approximate paleocoordinates: 31.6°N 102.8°E
- Region: Henan Province
- Country: China
- Extent: Tantou Basin

Type section
- Named for: Qiupa
- Qiupa Formation (China) Qiupa Formation (Henan)

The Qiupa Formation (Chinese: 秋扒组; pinyin: Qiūpázǔ) is a Late Cretaceous Maastrichtian geologic formation in Henan Province, central China. It is rich in dinosaur eggs and bones, such as those of carnivorous and herbivorous dinosaurs. The Qiupa Formation is considered to be Late Maastrichtian in age, about 72 million and 66 million years ago.

== Geology ==
The sedimentation is characterized for the presence of calcareous mudstone interbedded with thin fine conglomerates, brownish red thick-bedded siltstone and parallel and cross laminations. This sedimentation indicates habitats composed by large and shallow meanders with braided river deltas.

== Fossil content ==
The Qiupa Formation has yielded numerous dinosaur fossils, particularly eggs. The remains of various theropods such as troodontids, dromaeosaurids and oviraptorosaurs have been found. In addition, indeterminate remains of sauropods, ornithopods, ankylosaurs, lizards, turtles and a possible avian bone are reported. Therizinosaurids Protoceratopsids, and medium sized sauropods are also known from the Qiupa Formation

Color key: Taxon / Reclassified taxon / Taxon falsely reported as present / Dubious taxon or junior synonym / Ichnotaxon / Ootaxon / Morphotaxon	Notes; Uncertain or tentative taxa are in small text; ~~crossed out~~ taxa are discredited.

=== Dinosaurs ===
==== Ornithischians ====
Ornithischians of the Qiupa Formation
Genus	Species	Location	Stratigraphic position	Material	Notes	Image
Ankylosauridae indet.	Indeterminate	Luanchuan County, Henan Province, China	Maastrichtian	A tooth, a well-preserved dorsal vertebra, an incomplete dorsal rib, and an ischium.	A ankylosaurid ankylosaur	

==== Theropods ====
Theropods of the Qiupa Formation
Genus	Species	Location	Stratigraphic position	Material	Notes	Image
Luanchuanraptor	L. henanensis	Luanchuan County, Henan Province, China	Maastrichtian	Teeth, a frontal, and fragmented postcrania.	A velociraptorine dromaeosaurid	
Macroolithus	M. yaotunensis	Luanchuan County, Henan Province, China	Maastrichtian	One partial clutch containing eight complete eggs and numerous fragments.	An elongatoolithid, most likely laid by Yulong mini.	
Qiupalong	Q. henanensis	Luanchuan County, Henan Province, China	Maastrichtian	Partial skeleton preserving the pelvis and the right hindlimb.	A ornithomimid ornithomimosaur	
Qiupanykus	Q. zhangi	Luanchuan County, Henan Province, China	Maastrichtian	Partial skeleton with vertebrae and hindlimbs.	A parvicursorine alvarezsaurid	
"Tyrannosaurus"	T. luanchuanensis	Luanchuan County, Henan Province, China	Maastrichtian	Five teeth.	A tyrannosaurine tyrannosaurid; junior synonymous with Tarbosaurus bataar.	
Yulong	Y. mini	Luanchuan County, Henan Province, China	Maastrichtian	Many juvenile specimens and one subadult skeleton.	A oviraptorid oviraptorosaur	
Yuornis	Y. junchangi	Luanchuan County, Henan Province, China	Maastrichtian	Partial skeleton.	A enantiornithinean bird	

=== Squamates ===
Squamates of the Qiupa Formation
Genus	Species	Location	Stratigraphic position	Material	Notes	Image
Funiusaurus	F. luanchuanensis	Luanchuan County, Henan Province, China	Maastrichtian	Several cranial and postcranial remains.	A polyglyphanodontian lizard	
Tianyusaurus	T. zhengi	Luanchuan County, Henan Province, China	Maastrichtian	Skull and shoulder girdle.	A polyglyphanodontian lizard	
Zhongyuanxi	Z. jiai	Luanchuan County, Henan Province, China	Maastrichtian	Partial skull.	A paleoanguimorphan anguimorph	

=== Mammals ===
Mammals of the Qiupa Formation
Genus	Species	Location	Stratigraphic position	Material	Notes	Image
Lotheridium	L. mengi	Luanchuan County, Henan Province, China	Maastrichtian	Nearly complete skull with jaws.	A deltatheroidan metatherian	
Yubaatar	Y. zhongyuanensis	Luanchuan County, Henan Province, China	Maastrichtian	"Virtually complete crania and fragmented poscrania".	A taeniolabidoid multituberculate	

=== Oofossils ===
Oofossils of the Qiupa Formation
Genus	Species	Location	Stratigraphic position	Material	Notes	Image
Elongatoolithidae sp.	Indeterminate	Luanchuan County, Henan Province, China	Maastrichtian	145 egg shells	Oviraptorid eggs	
Macroolithus	M. yaotunensis	Luanchuan County, Henan Province, China	Maastrichtian	Egg clutch	Oviraptorid eggs	
