= Yulong mini =

Yulong Temporal range: Late Cretaceous, 72–66 Ma
- Reconstructed skeleton, Shanghai Natural History Museum

Scientific classification
- Kingdom: Animalia
- Phylum: Chordata
- Class: Reptilia
- Clade: Dinosauria
- Clade: Saurischia
- Clade: Theropoda
- Family: †Oviraptoridae
- Genus: †Yulong; Lü et al., 2013

Type species
- †Yulong mini Lü et al., 2013

Extinct species of dinosaur

Yulong is an extinct genus of derived oviraptorid theropod dinosaur known from the Late Cretaceous Qiupa Formation of Henan Province, central China. It contains a single species, Yulong mini. It is known from many juvenile specimens that represent some of the smallest known oviraptorids and also a single subadult specimen.

== Discovery and naming ==
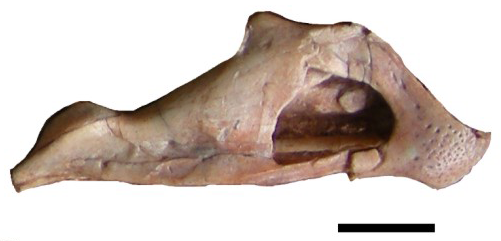
Lower jaw of specimen HGM 41HIII-0109

Specimens of Yulong were collected near Qiupa Town in Luanchuan County, Henan Province, from the Qiupa Formation. The exact geological age of the Qiupa Formation is unknown, but it probably dates to the Late Cretaceous based on the presence of oviraptorids (Yulong), dromaeosaurids (Luanchuanraptor), ornithomimids (Qiupalong), alvarezsaurs (Qiupanykus) and other, undescribed, derived dinosaur specimens.

Yulong was first described and named by Junchang Lü, Philip J. Currie, Li Xu, Xingliao Zhang, Hanyong Pu and Songhai Jia in 2013 and the type species is Yulong mini. The generic name is derived from Chinese 豫 (Yù), the one-character abbreviation of Henan Province, in reference to the occurrence of the genus, and from 龙/龍 lóng meaning "dragon" - a suffix commonly used to name Chinese dinosaurs like the Greek saurus is in the West. The specific name, mini, refers to the small size of the specimens.

Yulong is based on a syntype series of five specimens: HGM 41HIII-0107: an exceptionally well-preserved skeleton with a skull and lower jaws that is housed in the Henan Geological Museum, only lacking the skull and the neck base; HGM 41HIII-0108: a skull lacking the lower jaws; HGM 41HIII-0109: a partial skeleton with skull and lower jaws; HGM 41HIII-0110: a partial skull with lower jaws and some neck vertebrae; and HGM 41HIII-0111: a left ilium. Additional finds have been mentioned in the describing paper. One exceptionally preserved embryo (within an egg) is HGM 41HIII-0301, which came from a nest of 26 eggs. The first non-juvenile specimen of Y. mini was described by Wei et al. (2022) and consists of three dorsal and 29 caudal vertebrae, partial pectoral girdles, and forelimbs.

== Description ==
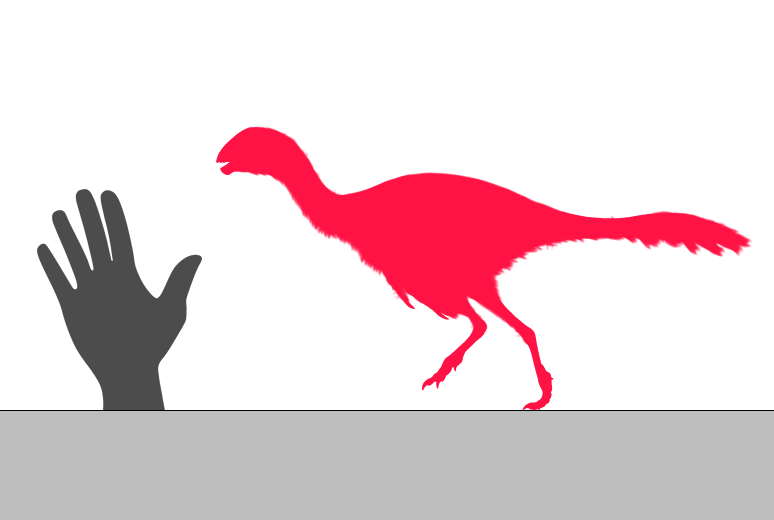
Size comparison

While oviraptorids were generally one to eight metres in body length, Yulong was described as "chicken-sized" by its describers. Most of the Yulong individuals had a total body length of a quarter to half a meter, making them some of the smallest known oviraptorids.

The describing authors established some diagnostic traits. The front upper corner of the fenestra antorbitalis and the rear upper corner of the bony nostril are positioned at about the same height. The premaxilla shows a distinctive opening below and in front of the nostril. The rear upper process of the premaxilla touches the upper rim of the fenestra antorbitalis but not the front process of the lacrimal; the nasal bone separates both bones. The parietal approaches the frontal bone in length. At the fourth and fifth neck vertebrae, the rear edge of the vertebral centrum forms a straight line between the postzygapophyses. The thigh bone is longer than the ilium.

According to the authors, the hindlimb proportions of oviraptorids do not essentially change during growth, indicating a more sedentary lifestyle and thus probably herbivory.

== Classification ==
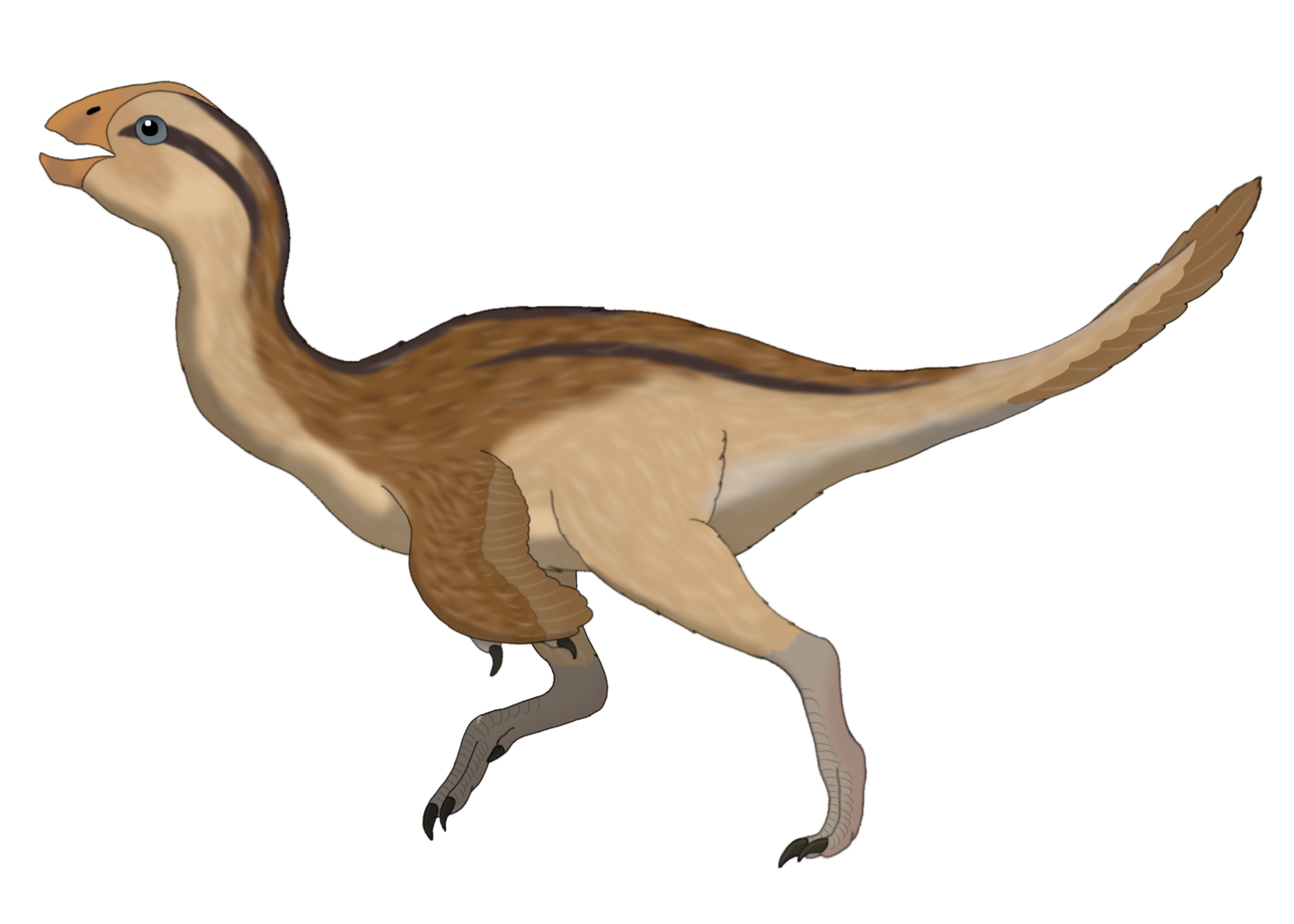
Life restoration of Yulong

A phylogenetic analysis performed by the describers found Yulong to be more derived than the gigantic oviraptorid Gigantoraptor erlianensis, and less derived than (as a sister taxon to) the clade formed by the Oviraptorinae and the "Ingeniinae". However, the describers cautioned that the phylogenetic position of Yulong is still uncertain, because younger specimens tend to display more basal traits than adult specimens that are unknown for Yulong.

Wei et al. (2022) found Yulong to be a basal oviraptorid outside Citipatiinae and Heyuanninae.

== See also ==
- Timeline of oviraptorosaur research
