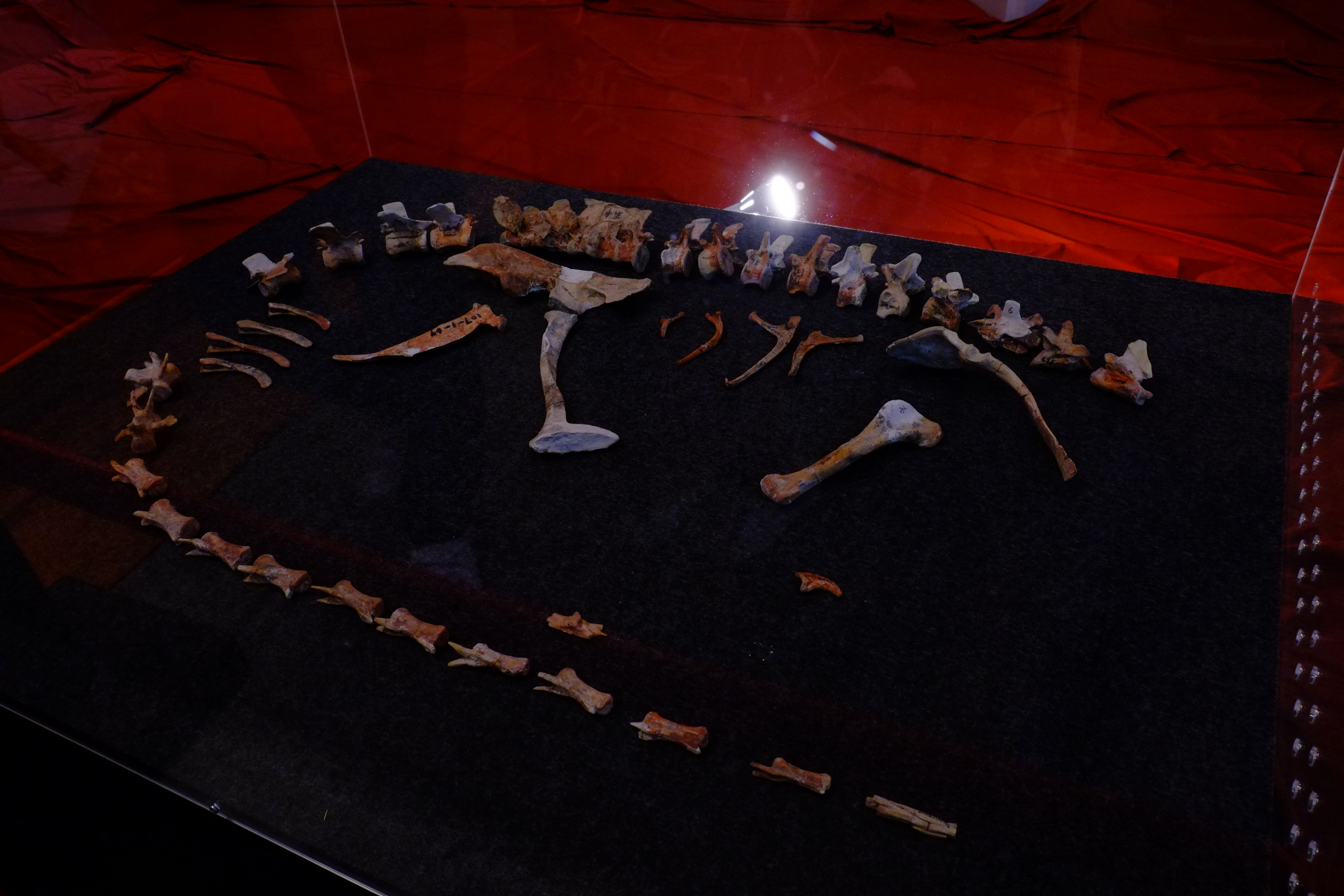
- Elements from the holotype fossil 41HIII-0100 displayed at the Giga Dinosaur Exhibition 2017

Scientific classification
- Kingdom: Animalia
- Phylum: Chordata
- Class: Reptilia
- Clade: Dinosauria
- Clade: Saurischia
- Clade: Theropoda
- Family: †Dromaeosauridae
- Clade: †Eudromaeosauria
- Subfamily: †Velociraptorinae
- Genus: †Luanchuanraptor; Lü et al. 2007

Type species
- †Luanchuanraptor henanensis Lü et al. 2007

= Luanchuanraptor =

Luanchuanraptor Temporal range: Late Cretaceous 72–66 Ma

Extinct genus of dinosaurs

Luanchuanraptor (meaning "Luanchuan thief") is a genus of dromaeosaurid theropod dinosaurs from the Late Cretaceous of China. The genus is based on a partial skeleton from the Qiupa Formation in Luanchuan, Henan. They were medium-sized dromaeosaurids, the first Asian dromaeosaurid taxa described from outside the Gobi Desert or northeastern China.

== Discovery and naming ==
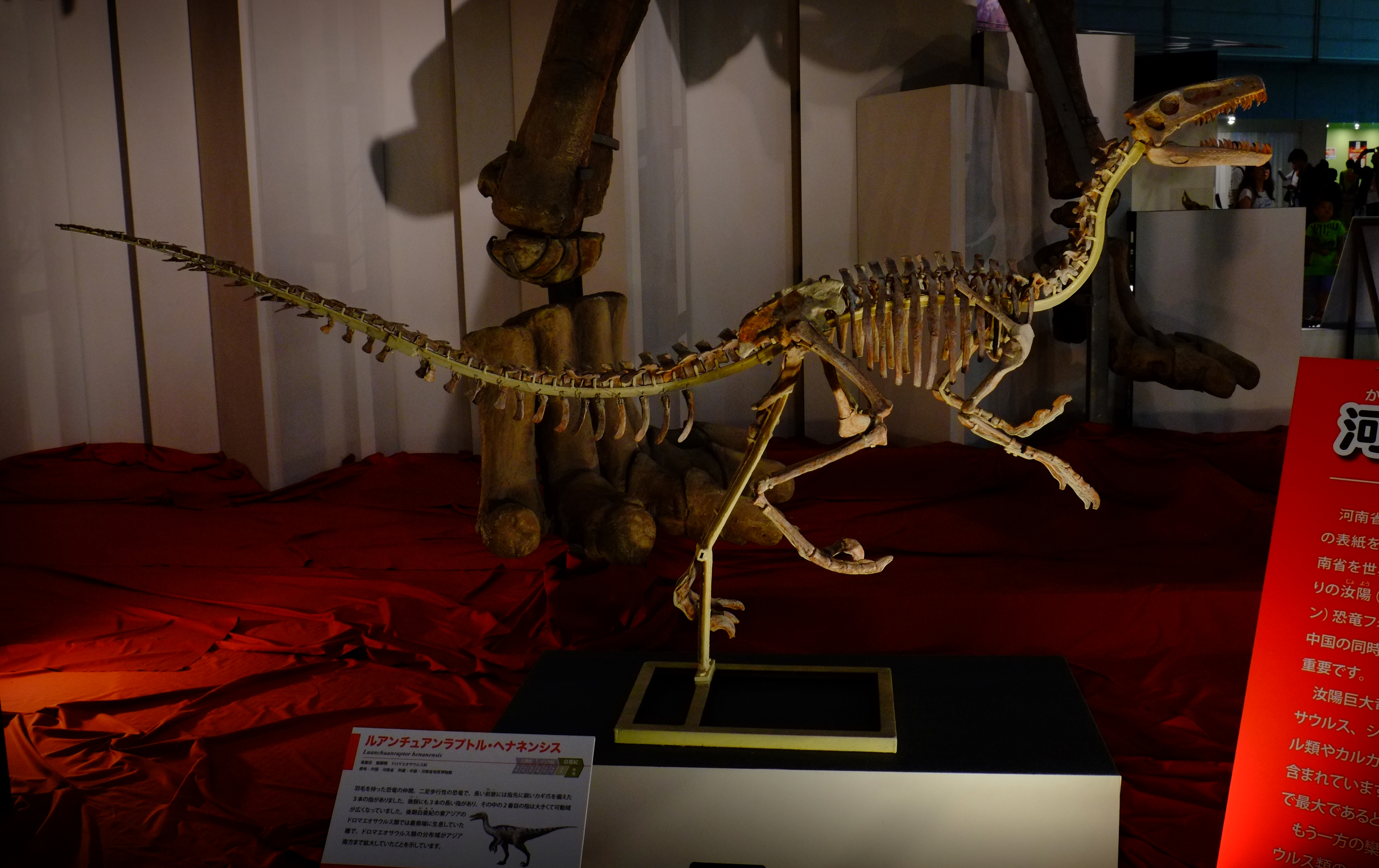
Reconstructed skeleton at the Giga Dinosaur Exhibition 2017, Chiba

Luanchuanraptor is known from a partial skeleton of an immature individual found at the Qiupa Formation of the Henan Province, Central China. The fossils were cataloged as 41HIII-0100 and described by Lü and colleagues in 2007. The remains represent the holotype for the genus and species Luanchuanraptor henanensis and they are housed at the Henan Geological Museum. It consists of the left frontal, 4 teeth (9 were identified but 5 were excluded), 4 cervical vertebrae, 6 dorsal vertebrae, 17 caudal vertebrae, 4 ribs, 4 chevrons, a right humerus, left scapulocoracoid, the first phalanx from right manus, an isolated manual ungual, right ilium, left pubis, ischium, the sacrum and the shaft of the left femur. These elements come from a moderately sized dromaeosaurid. Its specific name, Luanchuanraptor, is a reference to the Luanchuan County in which the remains were found, and the Latin raptor, meaning thief or seizer. The specific name, henanensis, is a reference to the Henan Province.

== Description ==
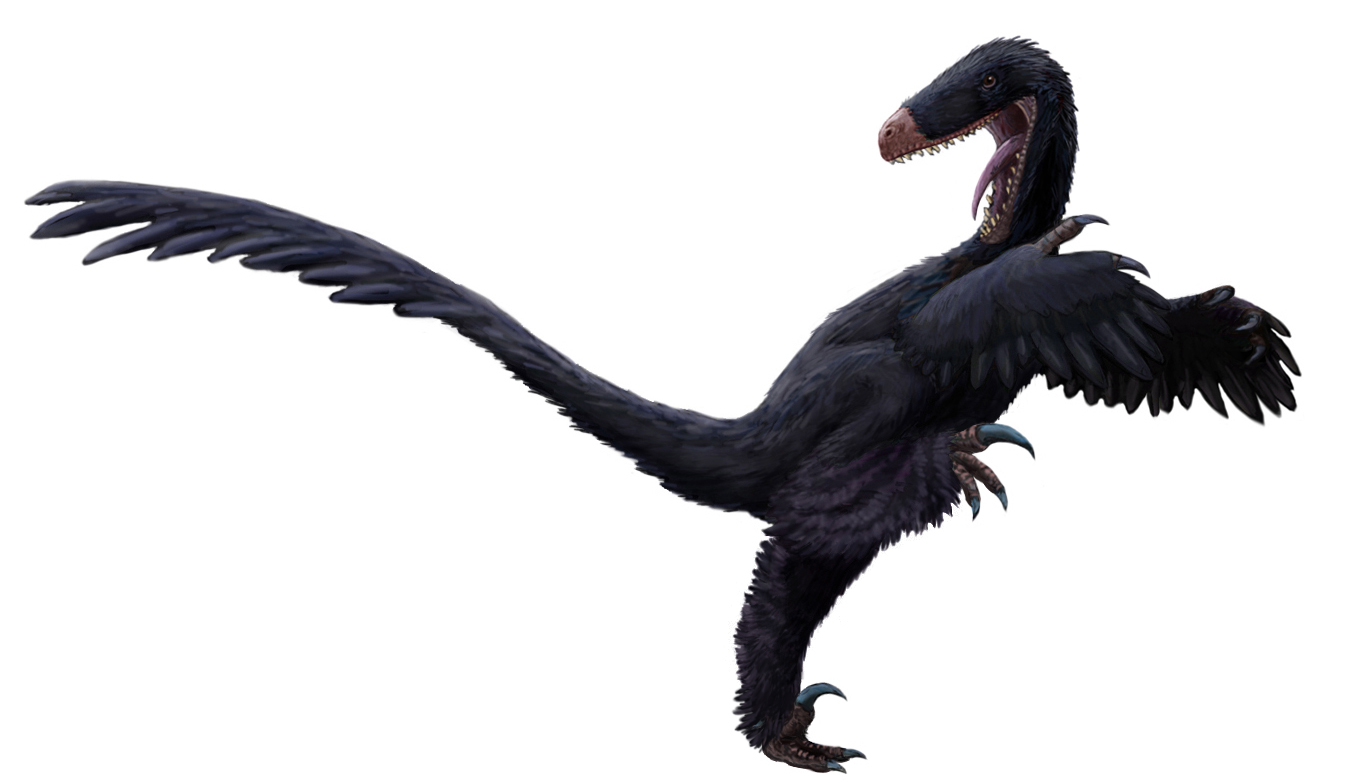
Life restoration

Luanchuanraptor were moderate-sized dromaeosaurs, estimated at 1.1 to 1.8 m (3.6 to 5.9 ft) long with weights from 2.2 to 2.5 kg (4.9 to 5.5 lb). However, the individual 41HIII-0100 preserves an unfused frontal, meaning that it was not a fully-grown animal at the time of death and therefore, they reached slightly larger sizes.

They can be recognised from other dromaeosaur taxa in having a very stiff tail tip as indicated by the short neural spines of the caudal vertebrae, connected anterior chevrons, some posterior caudals with depressions near the neural spine, stocky proximal and posterior end of the chevrons, and a large opening on the coracoid.

== Classification ==
Lü and colleagues assigned Luanchuanraptor to the Dromaeosauridae based on the recurved, serrated and laterally flattened teeth, the continuous parapophyses on dorsal vertebrae, and the elongate caudal prezygapophyses. The genus has been considered to pertain to the Averaptora by Agnolín and Novas, but this suggestion is not widely followed. The recently performed phylogenetic analysis for the Dromaeosauridae by Hartman et al. 2019 recovers Luanchuanraptor as a velociraptorine being the sister taxon of Adasaurus. Below is the obtained result for the Eudromaeosauria:

- Eudromaeosauria
  - - Deinonychus
    - - Achillobator
      - Utahraptor
      - Yixianosaurus
  - - Velociraptorinae
      - IGM 100 980
      - - Velociraptor mongoliensis
        - - Luanchuanraptor
          - Adasaurus
    - Dromaeosaurinae
      - Saurornitholestes
      - - IGM 100 22/23
        - - - Itemirus
            - Linheraptor
          - - Tsaagan
            - Dromaeosaurus

== Paleoenvironment ==
The remains of Luanchuanraptor were found in the Late Cretaceous Qiupa Formation of China. It is considered to be Late Maastrichtian in age about 72 million to 66 million years ago based on stratigraphic correlations. Most of the environments present consisted on shallow lakes with braided, delta rivers. The fauna present on the formation seems to be different from other Asiatic formations, with the well reported occurrences of mammals and lizards like Yubaatar or Funiusaurus. Dinosaurian fauna was present as well, here Luanchuanraptor shared their habitat with other theropods such as Qiupalong, Qiupanykus or Yulong. Large tyrannosaurids have been reported from the formation under the species "Tyrannosaurus" luanchuanensis.

== See also ==
- Timeline of dromaeosaurid research
- Glossary of dinosaur anatomy
