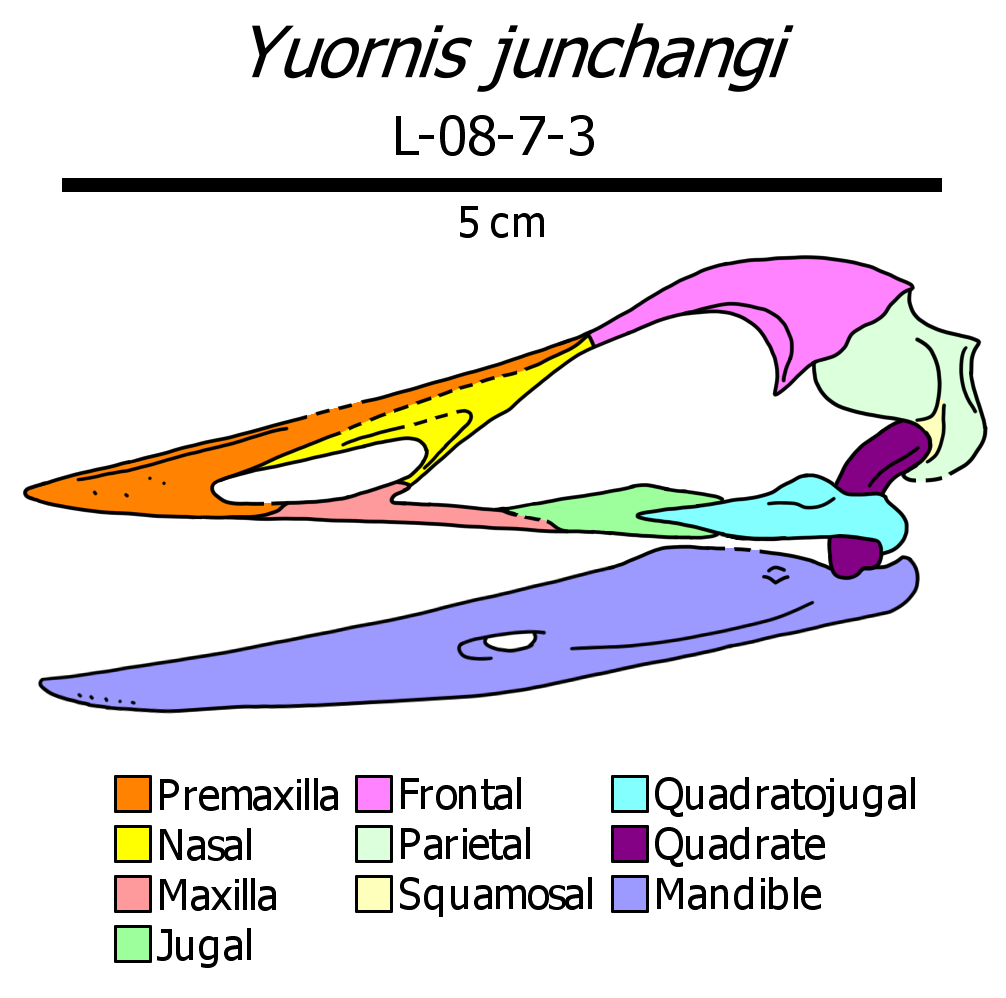
- Skull diagram

Scientific classification
- Domain: Eukaryota
- Kingdom: Animalia
- Phylum: Chordata
- Clade: Dinosauria
- Clade: Saurischia
- Clade: Theropoda
- Clade: Avialae
- Clade: †Enantiornithes
- Genus: †Yuornis; Xu et al., 2021
- Species: †Y. junchangi

Binomial name
- †Yuornis junchangi Xu et al., 2021

= Yuornis =

Yuornis Temporal range: Late Cretaceous 72–66 Ma

Extinct genus of birds

Yuornis (meaning "Henan bird", after the Chinese one-character abbreviation for Henan, 豫 (pinyin: Yù)) is an extinct genus of enantiornithean bird known from the Late Cretaceous of Henan, China. It contains one species, Yuornis junchangi, named after Lü Junchang.

== Description ==
The holotype specimen is remarkably complete for a Late Cretaceous enantiornithean, possessing a three dimensionally-preserved skull and partial skeleton. Unlike most enantiornitheans, the skull of Yuornis was completely toothless and convergently similar to that of Neornithes (modern birds). The lacrimal and postorbital bones are completely absent and the squamosal is strongly reduced; these losses leave the antorbital fenestra and supratemporal fenestra confluent with the orbit (eye socket), also like some modern birds. Unlike modern birds, the premaxilla makes up a smaller portion of the lower edge of the snout, while the quadratojugal is unusually large and complex.

== Classification ==
The phylogenetic analysis of Xu et al. (2021) positioned Yuornis as the sister taxon to Gobipteryx, another toothless Late Cretaceous enantiornithean. This would by definition place Yuornis in the family Gobipterygidae. However, the traits supporting this relationship were all related to tooth loss, a condition which is known to have convergently evolved many times in Mesozoic bird lineages. As a result, the authors refrained from formally considering Yuornis a gobipterygid.
