= Luanchuan County =

Luanchuan County 栾川县
- County
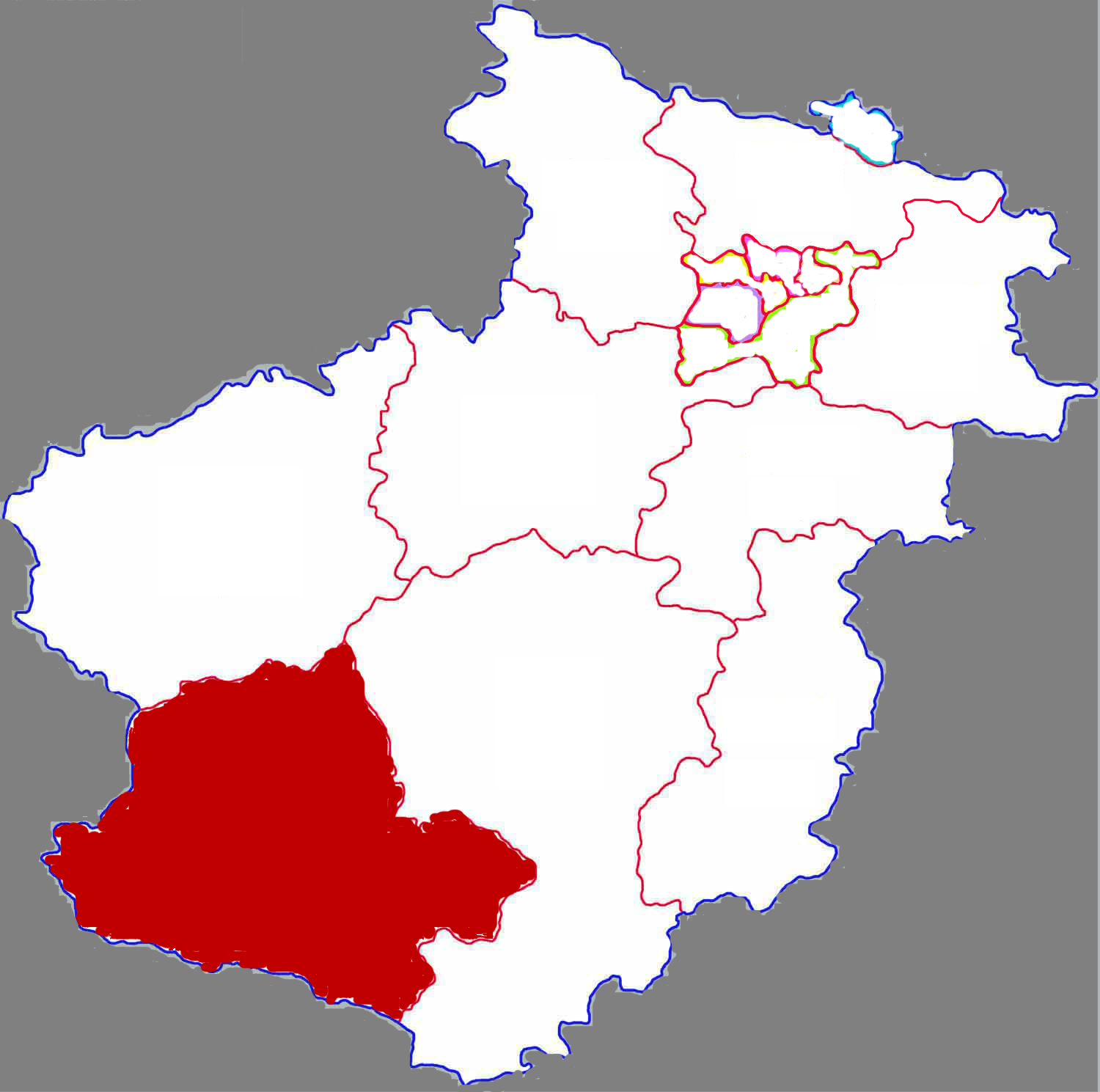
- Luanchuan in Luoyang

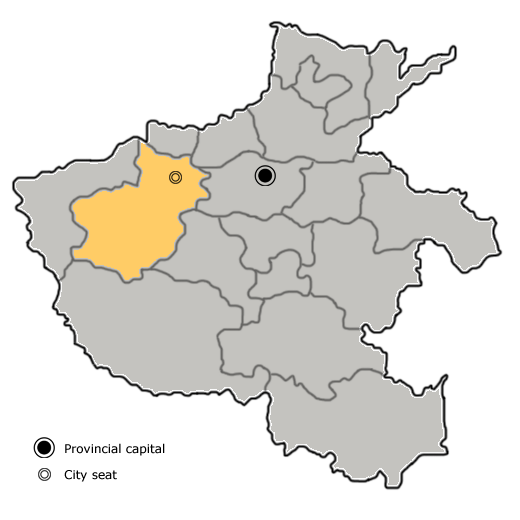
- Luoyang in Henan
- Coordinates: 33°47′10″N 111°36′58″E
- Country: People's Republic of China
- Province: Henan
- Prefecture-level city: Luoyang

Area
  - Total: 2,478 km^{2} (957 sq mi)

Population (2019)
  - Total: 351,400
  - Density: 141.8/km^{2} (367.3/sq mi)
- Time zone: UTC+8 (China Standard)
- Postal code: 471500
- Website: archived link

Luanchuan County (simplified Chinese: 栾川县; traditional Chinese: 欒川縣; pinyin: Luánchuān Xiàn) is a county under the jurisdiction of the prefecture-level city of Luoyang, in the west of Henan province, China.

It has an area of 2,177 km^{2} (841 sq mi) and a population of 318,000.

The county contains significant deposits of molybdenum and tungsten.

== Administrative divisions ==
As of 2012, this county is divided to 7 towns and 7 townships.

Towns

- Chengguan (城关镇)
- Chitudian (赤土店镇)
- Heyu (合峪镇)
- Tantou (潭头镇)
- Sanchuan (三川镇)
- Lengshui (冷水镇)
- Taowan (陶湾镇)

Townships

- Luanchuan Township (栾川乡)
- Miaozi Township (庙子乡)
- Qiuba Township (秋扒乡)
- Shizimiao Township (狮子庙乡)
- Baitu Township (白土乡)
- Jiaohe Township (叫河乡)
- Shimiao Township (石庙乡)

== Climate ==
Climate data for Luanchuan, elevation 742 m (2,434 ft), (1991–2020 normals, extremes 1991–present)
Month	Jan	Feb	Mar	Apr	May	Jun	Jul	Aug	Sep	Oct	Nov	Dec	Year
Record high °C (°F)	22.8 (73.0)	26.2 (79.2)	31.9 (89.4)	36.7 (98.1)	35.9 (96.6)	38.5 (101.3)	37.9 (100.2)	37.9 (100.2)	37.7 (99.9)	30.8 (87.4)	27.2 (81.0)	23.0 (73.4)	38.5 (101.3)
Mean daily maximum °C (°F)	6.8 (44.2)	9.7 (49.5)	15.0 (59.0)	21.4 (70.5)	25.1 (77.2)	28.9 (84.0)	30.2 (86.4)	28.7 (83.7)	24.3 (75.7)	19.8 (67.6)	14.2 (57.6)	8.8 (47.8)	19.4 (66.9)
Daily mean °C (°F)	−0.2 (31.6)	2.7 (36.9)	7.9 (46.2)	13.9 (57.0)	18.1 (64.6)	22.1 (71.8)	24.2 (75.6)	22.8 (73.0)	18.1 (64.6)	12.9 (55.2)	7.0 (44.6)	1.6 (34.9)	12.6 (54.7)
Mean daily minimum °C (°F)	−4.7 (23.5)	−2.1 (28.2)	2.4 (36.3)	7.9 (46.2)	12.3 (54.1)	16.5 (61.7)	19.8 (67.6)	18.8 (65.8)	13.9 (57.0)	8.2 (46.8)	2.2 (36.0)	−3.0 (26.6)	7.7 (45.8)
Record low °C (°F)	−13.9 (7.0)	−12.1 (10.2)	−8.8 (16.2)	−2.8 (27.0)	0.0 (32.0)	9.0 (48.2)	13.2 (55.8)	11.5 (52.7)	3.2 (37.8)	−3.0 (26.6)	−10.8 (12.6)	−16.7 (1.9)	−16.7 (1.9)
Average precipitation mm (inches)	10.2 (0.40)	14.3 (0.56)	30.7 (1.21)	58.7 (2.31)	86.8 (3.42)	98.6 (3.88)	169.7 (6.68)	140.1 (5.52)	108.3 (4.26)	59.8 (2.35)	29.8 (1.17)	7.0 (0.28)	814 (32.04)
Average precipitation days (≥ 0.1 mm)	5.0	5.5	7.7	8.6	10.6	10.6	15.0	13.8	11.7	9.8	6.5	4.0	108.8
Average snowy days	7.2	5.4	3.4	0.5	0	0	0	0	0	0.1	2.2	4.9	23.7
Average relative humidity (%)	58	61	59	60	64	68	77	80	78	73	66	58	67
Mean monthly sunshine hours	155.9	145.6	175.0	202.4	207.9	198.0	191.1	181.4	151.1	155.8	153.6	164.2	2,082
Percentage possible sunshine	49	47	47	52	48	46	44	44	41	45	50	54	47
Source: China Meteorological Administration

== Education ==
There is a central elementary school in Qiuba Town.

== See also ==
- Luanchuanraptor
