= Caninosaurus =

Caninosaurus Temporal range: Late Cretaceous, ~Campanian

Scientific classification
- Kingdom: Animalia
- Phylum: Chordata
- Class: Reptilia
- Order: Squamata
- Clade: †Polyglyphanodontia
- Genus: †Caninosaurus; Wang et al., 2025
- Species: †C. ganzhouensis

Binomial name
- †Caninosaurus ganzhouensis Wang et al., 2025

Genus of fossil lizards

Caninosaurus (meaning "canine lizard") is an extinct genus of polyglyphanodontian lizard from the Late Cretaceous (Campanian age) Tangbian Formation of China. The genus contains a single species, Caninosaurus ganzhouensis, known from a partial skull and mandible. It is characterized by a greatly enlarged caniniform tooth in the fourth maxillary alveolus.

== Discovery and naming ==
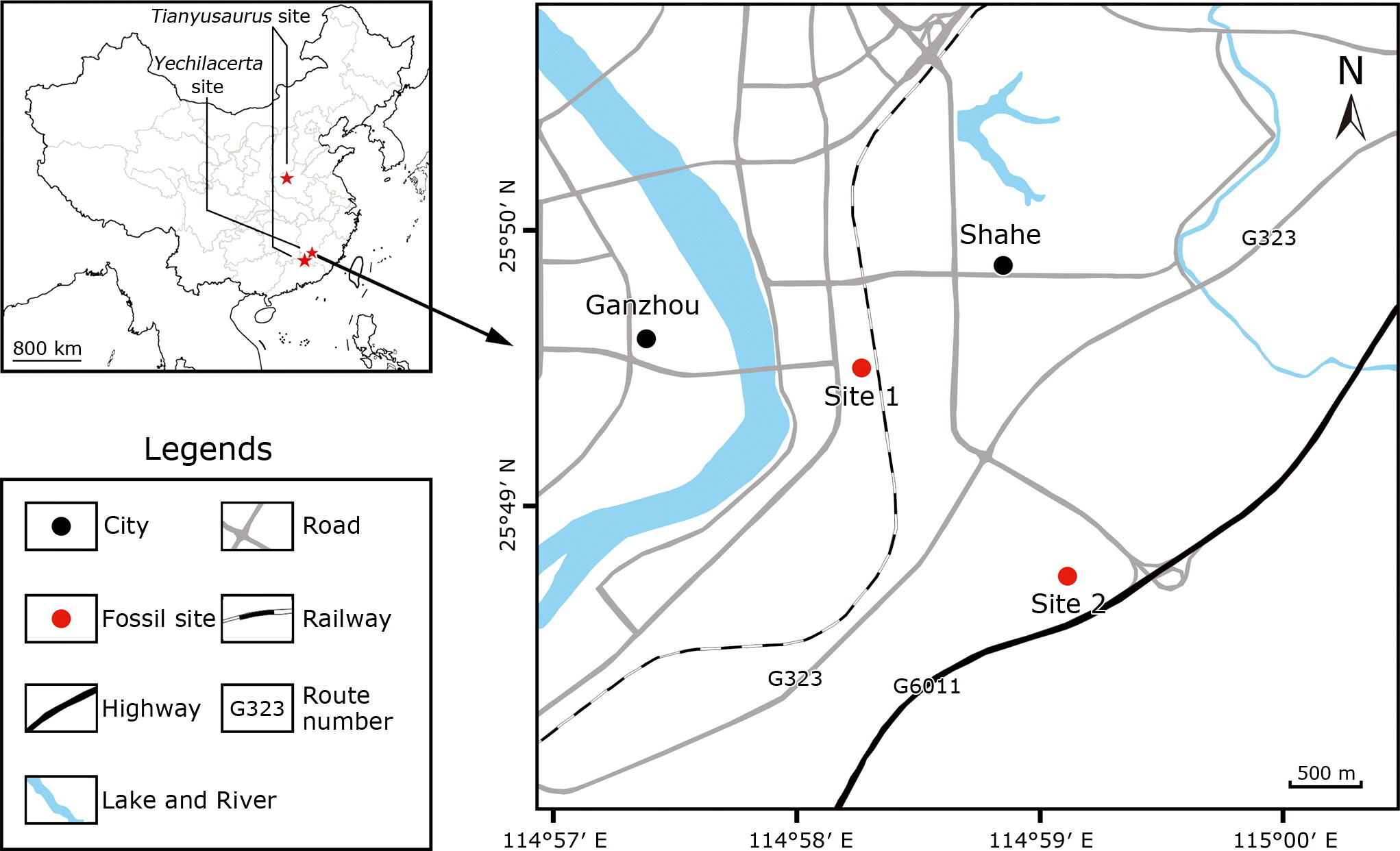
C. ganzhouensis type locality (Site 2)

The Caninosaurus holotype specimen, CUGW VH110, was discovered in outcrops of the Tangbian Formation, 2 kilometres (1.2 mi) away from the Ganzhou railway station of Ganzhou City in Jiangxi Province, China. The specimen consists of the anterior (toward the front) part of the skull and mandible, missing the rear portion of the skull. It is exposed in right lateral view, with the left side still buried in the surrounding matrix.

In 2025, Wang and colleagues described Caninosaurus ganzhouensis as a new genus and species of polyglyphanodontian lizard based on these fossil remains. The generic name, Caninosaurus, combines the Latin word caninus, a reference to the taxon's elongated caniniform teeth, with the Ancient Greek σαῦρος (sauros), meaning "lizard". The specific name, ganzhouensis, references the discovery of the specimen in Ganzhou City.

== Classification ==
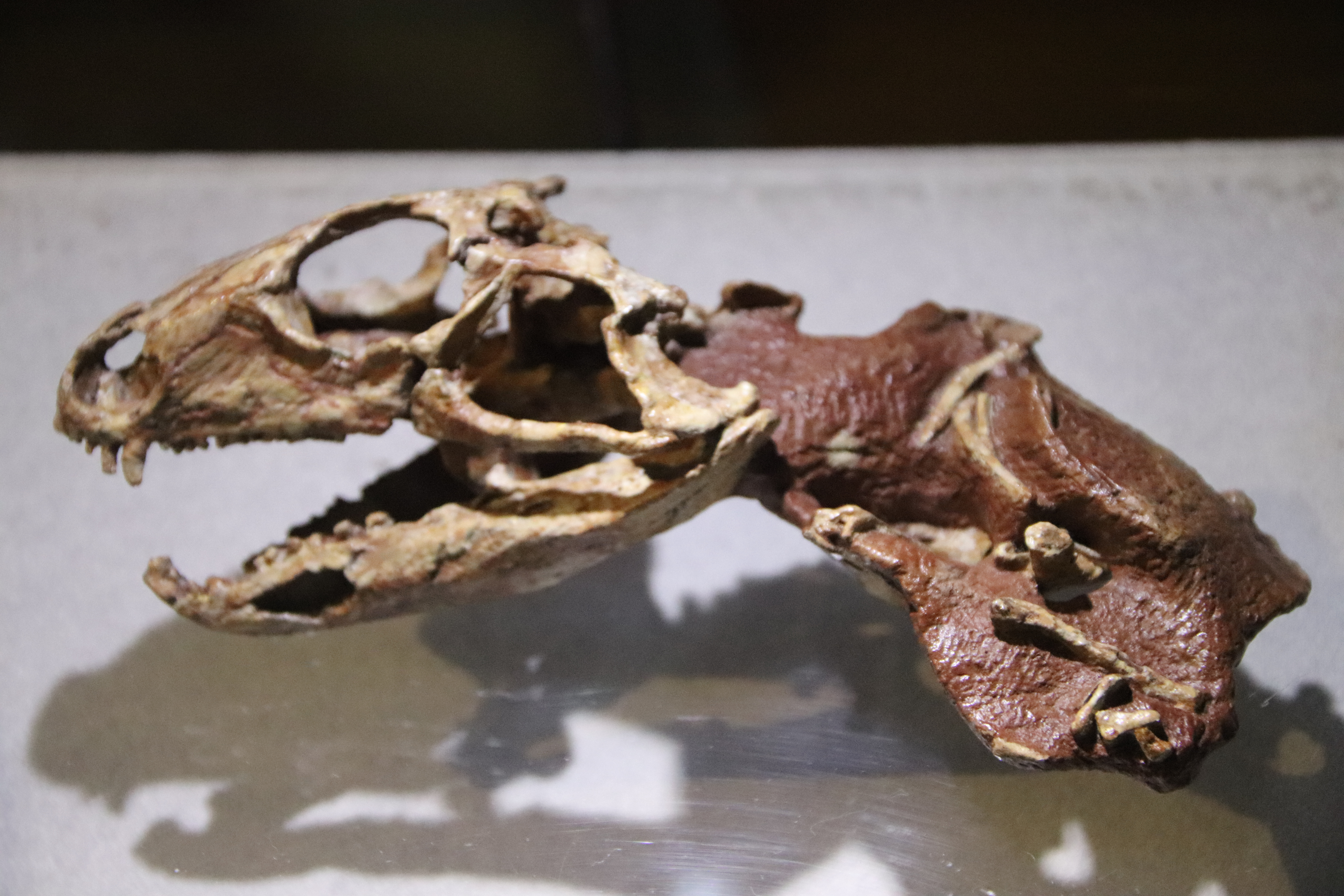
Skull of Tianyusaurus, a close relative, which preserves comparable caniniform dentition at the front of the snout

In their 2025 phylogenetic analysis, Wang and colleagues recovered Caninosaurus as a member of the squamate clade Polyglyphanodontia, as the sister taxon to Tianyusaurus in a clade also containing Yechilacerta. These two genera are also known from South China, and both bear a complete lower temporal bar resulting from an elongation of the posterior process of the jugal, a feature seen in very few other squamates. While this region is preserved in Caninosaurus, its close relation to taxa with this anatomical character suggests it may have been present. The results of the analysis of Wang et al. are shown in the cladogram below:

- Borioteiioidea
  - Tchingisaurus
  - Polyglyphanodontidae
    - Gobinatus
    - - - Yechilacerta
        - - Caninosaurus
          - Tianyusaurus
      - - - Funiusaurus
          - Adamisaurus
        - - Polyglyphanodon
          - Gilmoreteius
