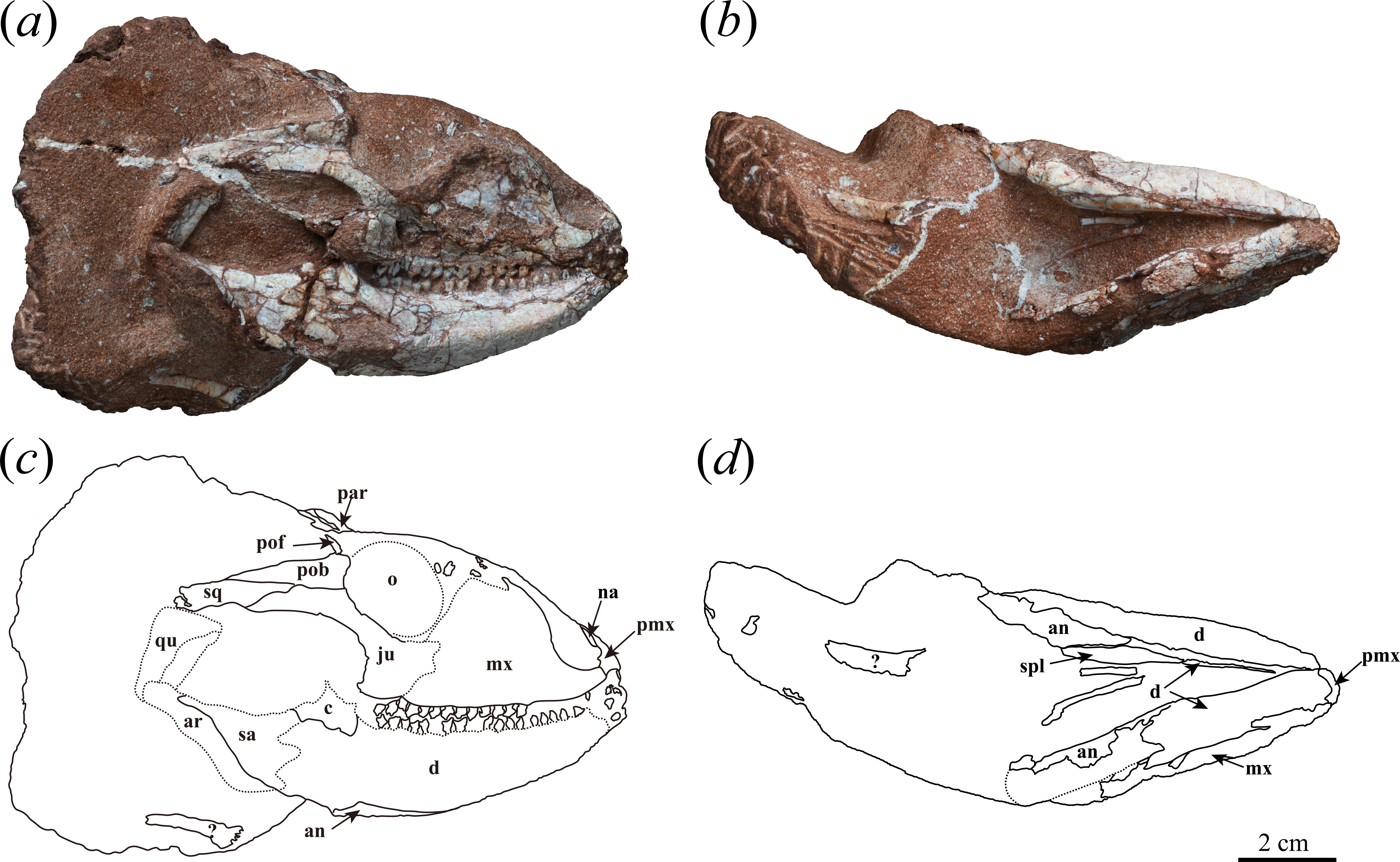
- Holotype skull, CVEB20180206

Scientific classification
- Kingdom: Animalia
- Phylum: Chordata
- Class: Reptilia
- Order: Squamata
- Clade: †Polyglyphanodontia
- Genus: †Xenodontolacerta; Jiang et al., 2026
- Species: †X. fangi

Binomial name
- †Xenodontolacerta fangi Jiang et al., 2026

= Xenodontolacerta =

Xenodontolacerta Temporal range: Late Cretaceous, Coniacian–Campanian

Genus of fossil lizards

Xenodontolacerta (meaning "lizard with strange teeth") is an extinct genus of polyglyphanodontian lizard from the Late Cretaceous (Coniacian–Campanian ages) Hekou Formation of China. The genus contains a single species, Xenodontolacerta fangi, known from a partial skull and mandible. Its teeth are uniquely heterodont, more similar to polyglyphanodontians from North America than those in Asia. This unique tooth morphology suggests Xenodontolacerta was likely omnivorous, contrasting with its herbivorous contemporaries.

== Discovery and naming ==
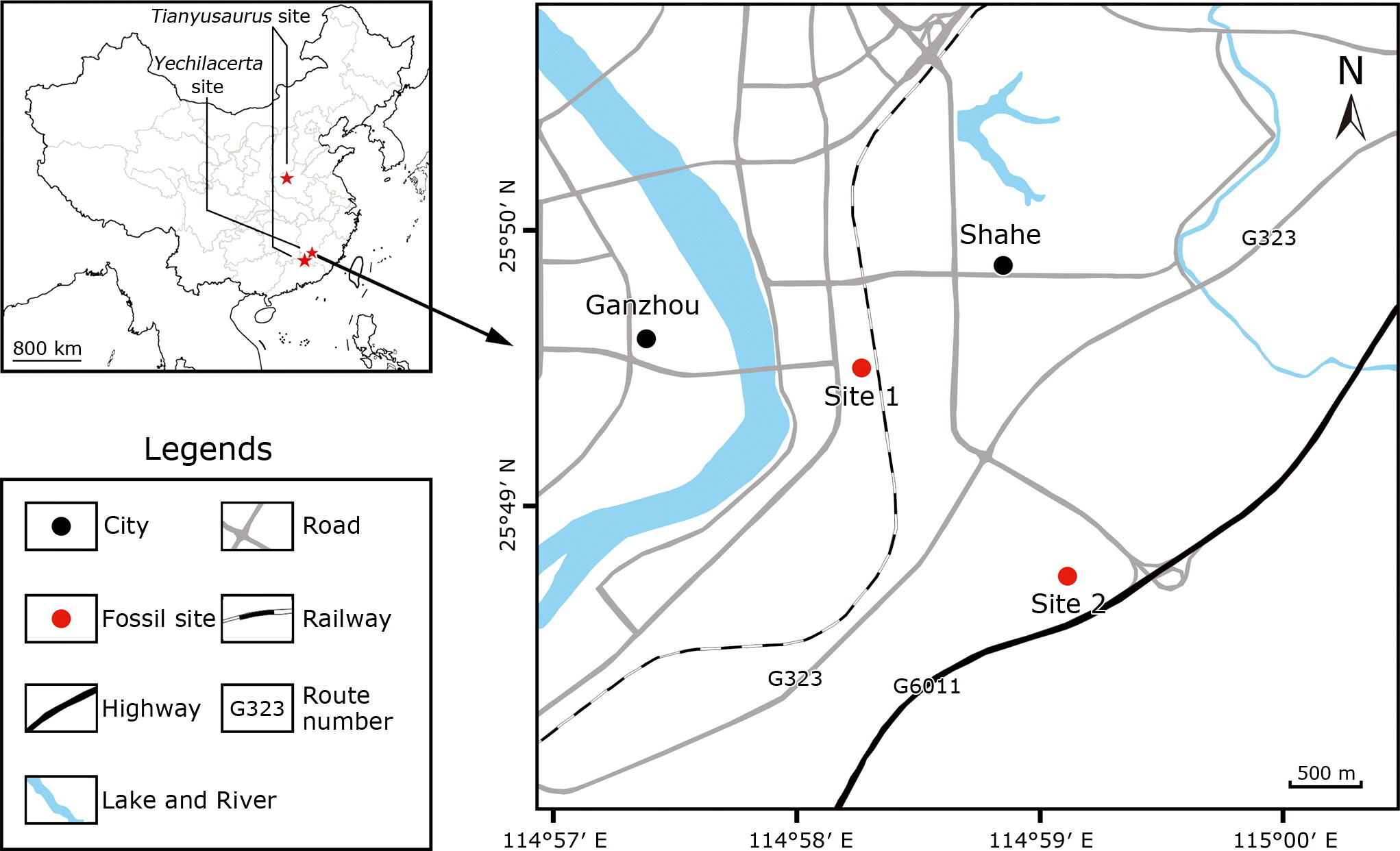
X. fangi type locality (Site 2)

The Xenodontolacerta fossil material was discovered in outcrops of the Hekou Formation (Guifeng Group, Ganzhou Basin). It was collected from the Huadong Cheng Construction site in Zhanggong District (Ganzhou City) in Jiangxi Province, China. The specimen is housed in the Centre for Evolution of Vertebrate Biology, associated with Yunnan University, where it is permanently accessioned as specimen CVEB20180206. The specimen consists of a partial skull occluded with both lower jaws. The right side of the skull is nearly complete, though cracked in places, while the left side is much more damaged. the entire specimen exhibits some taphonomic compression.

In 2026, Juan Jiang and colleagues described Xenodontolacerta fangi as a new genus and species of polyglyphanodontian lizard based on these fossil remains, establishing CVEB20180206 as the holotype specimen. The generic name, Xenodontolacerta, combines the Greek words ξένος (xénos), meaning 'strange' and ὀδών (odṓn), meaning 'tooth', with 'lacerta', the Latin word for 'lizard'. The intended meaning of the full genus name is 'lizard with strange teeth'. The specific name, fangi, honors the research contributions of Jing-Yun Fang in biodiversity, forest ecology, and carbon cycling.

== Description ==
The holotype skull of X. fangi is 10.7 centimetres (4.2 in) long, making it a generally large lizard and placing it among the largest polyglyphanodontians. In comparison, the skull of the coeval Yechilacerta is roughly the same size, at 10.5 cm (4.1 in), and the skull of Gilmoreteius is slightly larger, at 12 cm (4.7 in). Skulls of Polyglyphanodon and Tianyusaurus and markedly smaller, at 8.2–8.8 cm (3.2–3.5 in) long. The skull is strongly constructed, with robust arches, a pointed snout (partly resulting from lateral compression of the fossil during preservation), and a subtriangular profile in lateral view. Unlike Yechilacerta and Tianyusaurus, the lower temporal fenestra is elongated and remains open ventrally. The mandible is deep, robust, and nearly half the depth of the skull, with a distinctly curved ventral margin. The maxilla likely bore around 20 teeth, while the dentary is estimated to have contained approximately 25. Both the maxillary and dentary tooth rows are heterodont, consisting of small, pointed teeth at the front of the jaws and broader-crowned teeth toward the rear.

== Classification ==
To test the affinities and relationships of Xenodontolacerta, Jiang et al. (2026) included it in an updated version of the phylogenetic matrix of Martinelli et al (2021). The placement of this taxon within Polyglyphanodontia varied based on the analytical methods used; in their parsimony analysis (Topology A below), Xenodontolacerta was recovered as the sister taxon to Adamisaurus, while their Bayesian analysis (Topology B) recovered it as the sister to a clade formed by Tianyusaurus and the contemporary Yechilacerta. These results are displayed in the cladograms below:

Topology A: Parsimony tree

- †Polyglyphanodontia
  - Tchingisaurus multivagus
  - - Gobinatus arenosus
    - - - Adamisaurus magnidentatus
        - Xenodontolacerta fangi
      - - - Tianyusaurus zhengi
          - Yechilacerta yingliangia
        - - Gilmoreteius spp.
          - Polyglyphanodon sternbergi

Topology B: Bayesian analysis

- †Polyglyphanodontia
  - Tchingisaurus multivagus
  - - Gobinatus arenosus
    - - Adamisaurus magnidentatus
      - - Polyglyphanodon sternbergi
        - - Gilmoreteius spp.
          - - Xenodontolacerta fangi
            - - Tianyusaurus zhengi
              - Yechilacerta yingliangia
