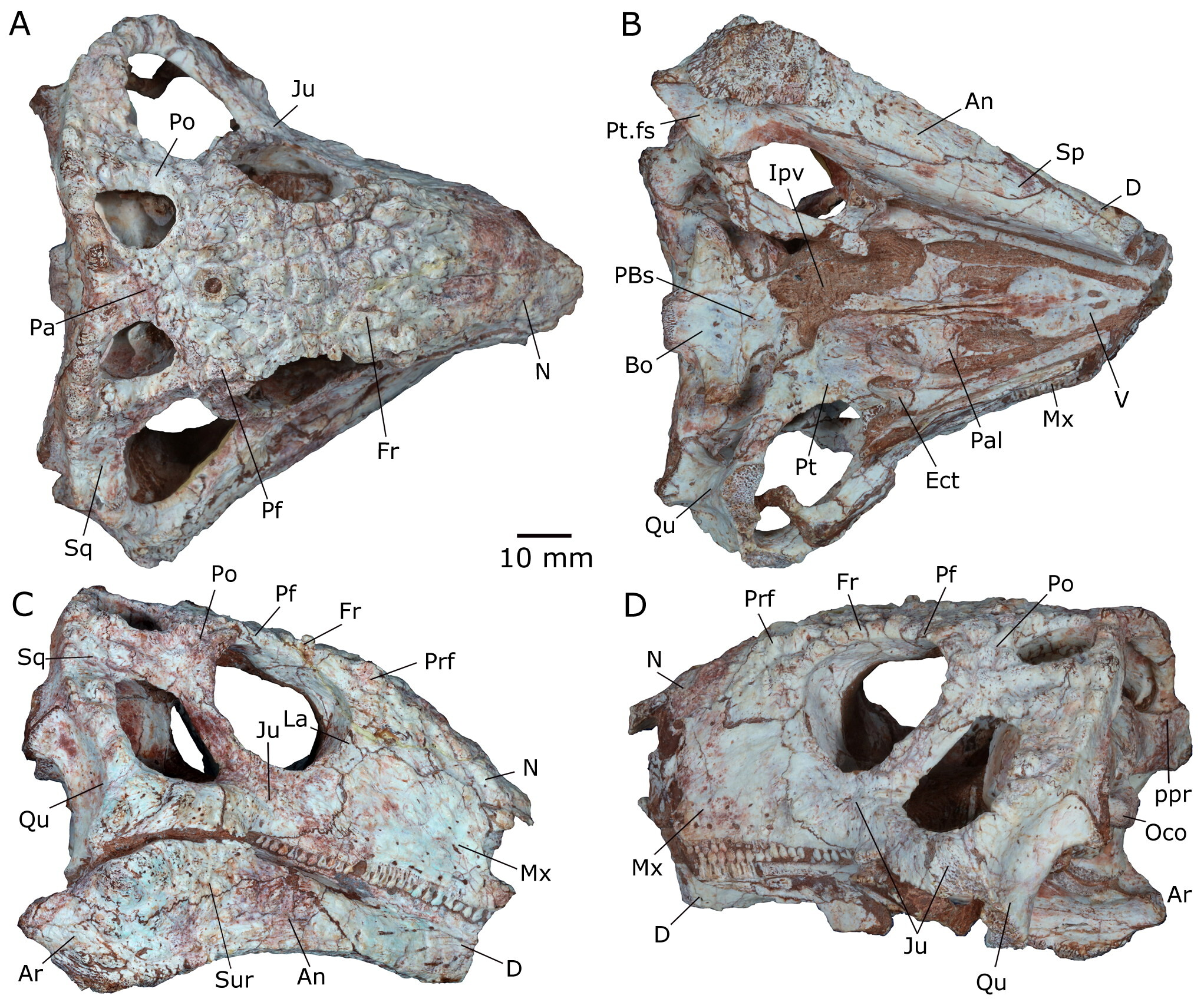
- Holotype skull, YLSNHM01796

Scientific classification
- Kingdom: Animalia
- Phylum: Chordata
- Class: Reptilia
- Order: Squamata
- Clade: †Polyglyphanodontia
- Family: †Gilmoreteiidae
- Genus: †Yechilacerta; Xing, Niu & Evans, 2023
- Species: †Y. yingliangia

Binomial name
- †Yechilacerta yingliangia Xing, Niu & Evans, 2023

= Yechilacerta =

Yechilacerta Temporal range: Late Cretaceous, ?Maastrichtian

Extinct lizard genus

Yechilacerta (meaning "leaf-toothed lizard") is an extinct genus of polyglyphanodontian lizard from the Late Cretaceous (Maastrichtian age) Hekou Formation of China. The genus contains a single species, Yechilacerta yingliangia, known from two skulls and a partial skeleton. It is unusual in possessing a complete lower temporal bar, a feature seen in very few other squamates.

== Discovery and naming ==
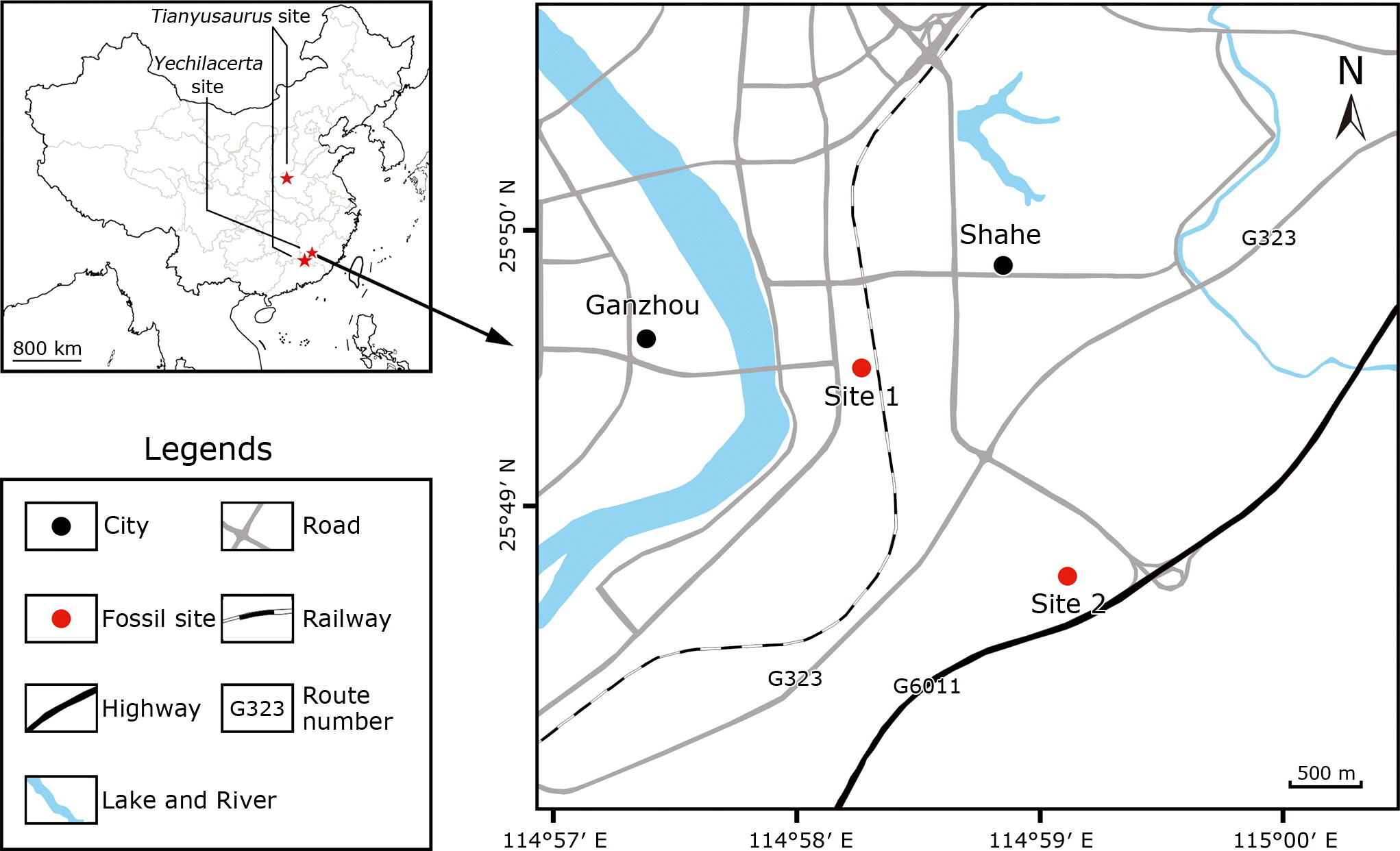
Discovery locality of the Y. yingliangia holotype (Site 2) and referred specimen (Site 1)

The Yechilacerta fossil material was discovered in outcrops of the Hekou Formation (Guifeng Group) in Zhanggong District of Ganzhou City, China. The holotype specimen, YLSNHM01796, consists of a nearly complete skull and mandible, missing the tip of the snout. It was collected from the Huadong Cheng Construction site. Another locality near the Ganzhou Train Station yielded a slightly larger and more complete specimen, represented by an associated nearly complete skull (YLSNHM01791A) and anterior part of the skeleton including the pectoral girdle, forelimbs, and dorsal vertebrae (YLSNHM01791B). A second block containing the posterior part of the skeleton was found nearby, containing much of the trunk and part of the pelvic girdle, hindlimbs, and tail (YLSNHM01791C). Based on their similar size and lack of overlapping elements, the skull and two blocks containing articulated skeletal elements were interpreted as belonging to the same individual, accessioned together as YLSNHM01791.

In 2023, Lida Xing, Kecheng Niu, and Susan E. Evans described Yechilacerta yingliangia as a new genus and species of polyglyphanodontian lizard based on these fossil remains. The generic name, Yechilacerta, combines the Chinese word yechi, meaning "leaf-toothed" with the Latin lacerta, meaning "lizard", in reference to the vaguely leaf-like morphology of the animal's dentition. The specific name, yingliangia, honors the Yingliang Stone Natural History Museum, in which the Yechilacerta specimens are housed.

== Classification ==
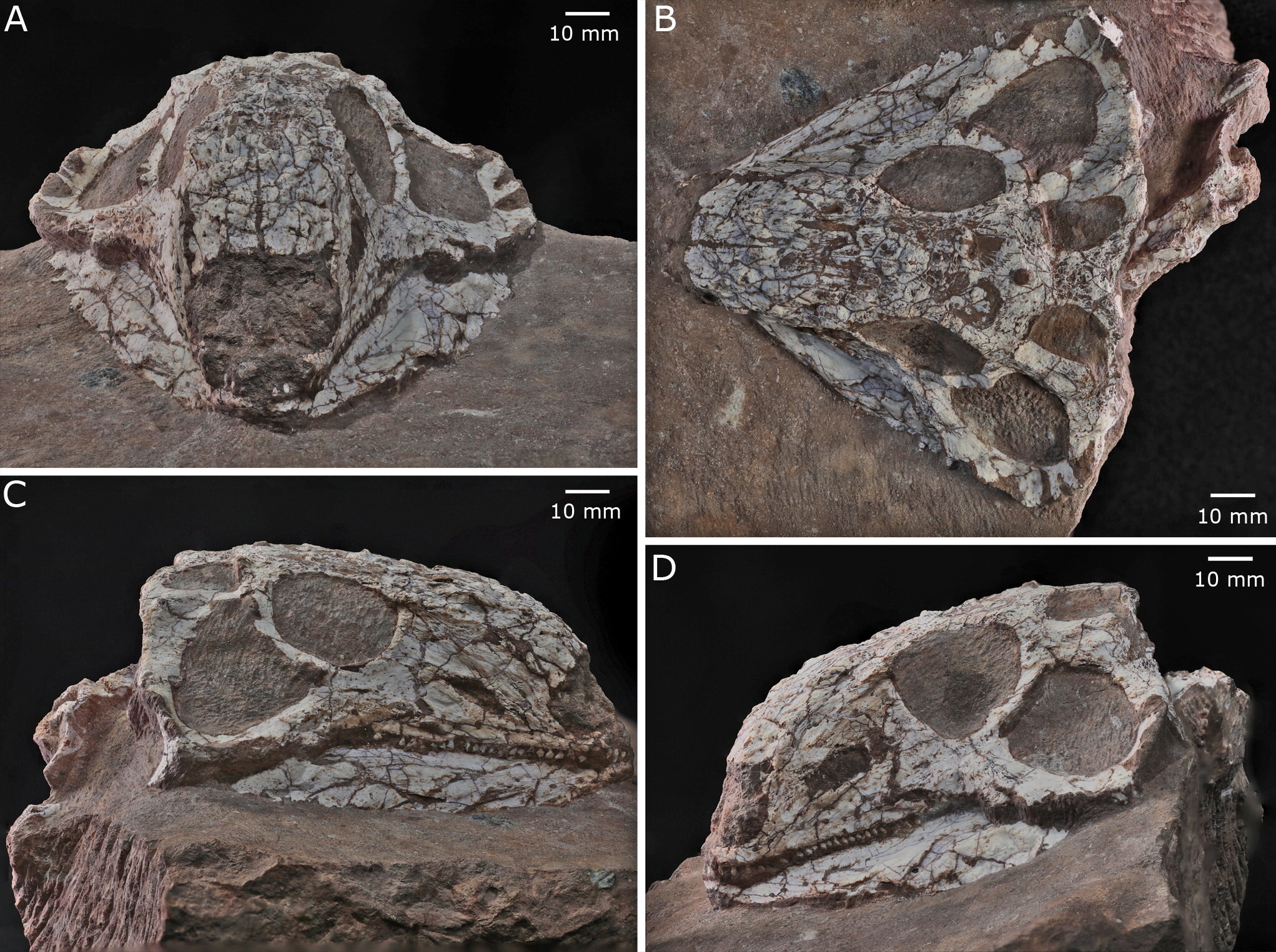
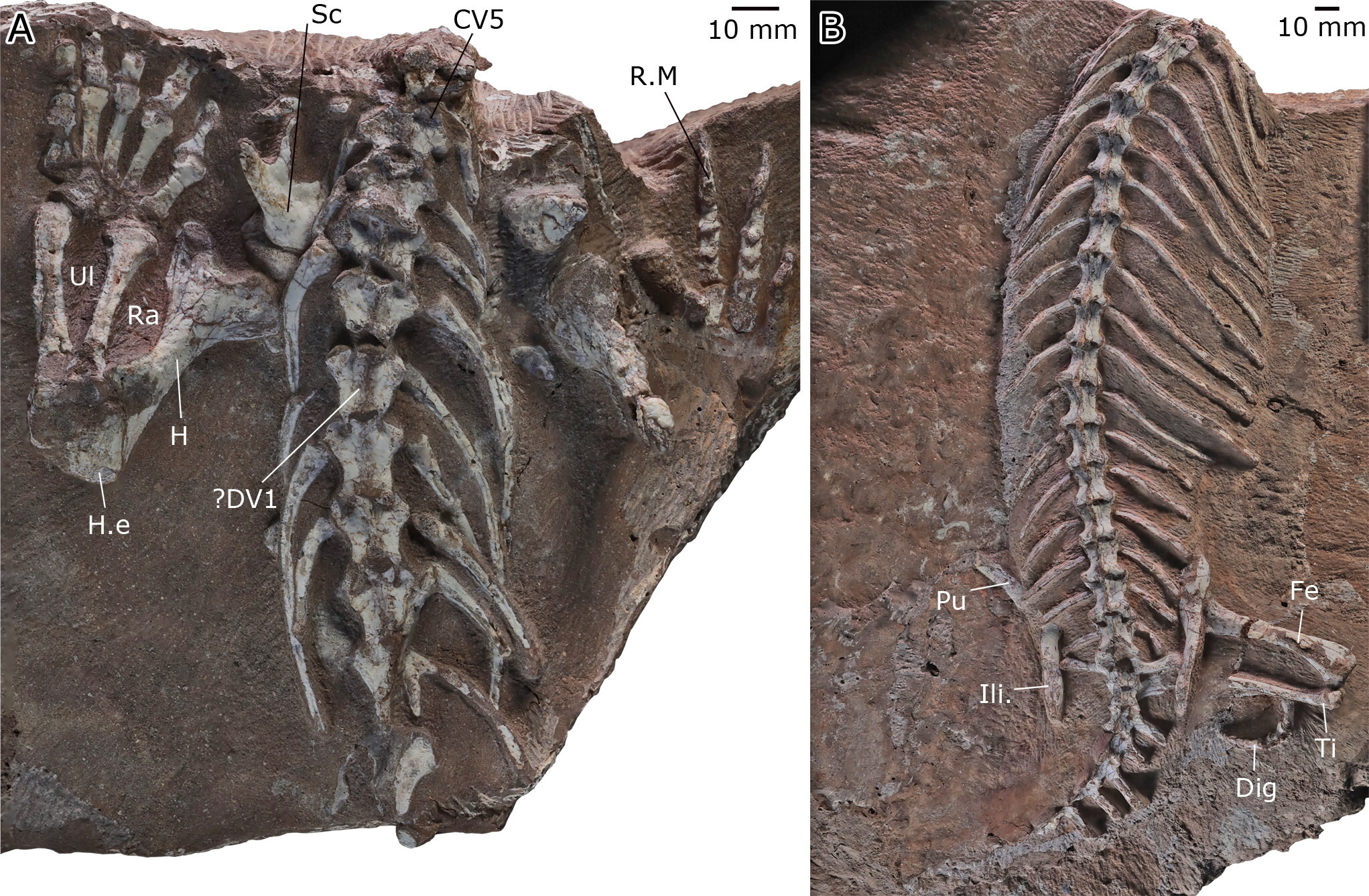
YLSNHM01791, Y. yingliangia referred skull (top) and postcranium (bottom)

In their phylogenetic analyses, Xing, Niu & Evans (2023) recovered Yechilacerta within a poorly-resolved Polyglyphanodontia, as the sister taxon to Tianyusaurus, another South Chinese taxon with a complete lower temporal bar. In their 2025 description of Caninosaurus, Wang and colleagues recovered similar, albeit more stable, results using a different phylogenetic matrix; their results placed Yechilacerta as the sister taxon to the clade formed by Caninosaurus and Tianyusaurus. This topology is displayed in the cladogram below:

- Borioteiioidea
  - Tchingisaurus
  - Polyglyphanodontidae
    - Gobinatus
    - - - Yechilacerta
        - - Caninosaurus
          - Tianyusaurus
      - - - Funiusaurus
          - Adamisaurus
        - - Polyglyphanodon
          - Gilmoreteius
