= North Horn Formation =

Geological formation in Utah

- Stratigraphic range: Maastrichtian-Danian; ~71–64 Ma
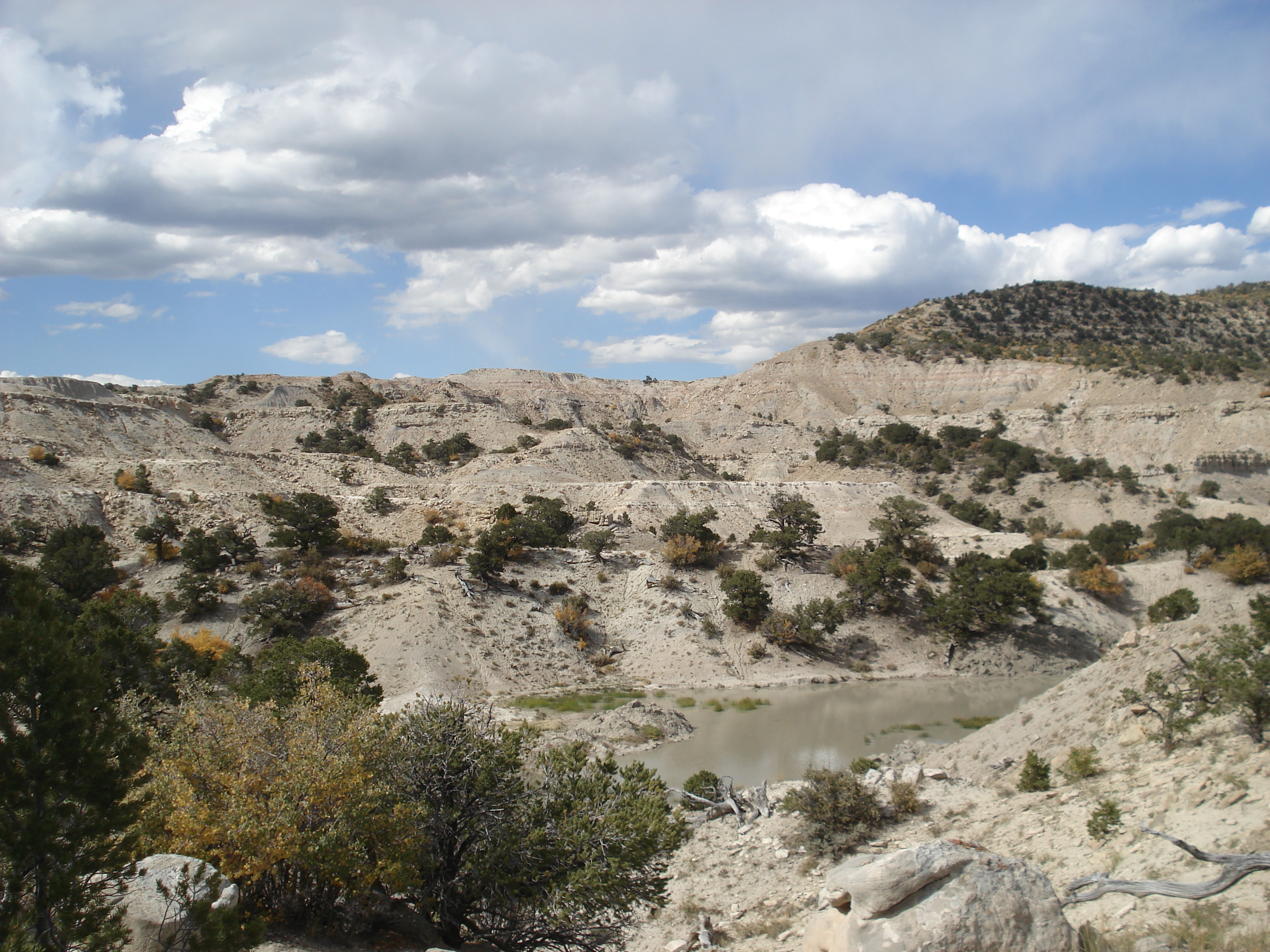
- Type locality for the North Horn Formation on North Horn Mountain, Emery County, Utah
- Type: Geological formation
- Underlies: Flagstaff Formation
- Overlies: Price River & Tuscher Formations
- Thickness: >1,100 m (3,600 ft)

Lithology
- Primary: Sandstone, shale, conglomerate
- Other: Siltstone, limestone, coal

Location
- Coordinates: 39.0°N 111.0°W
- Approximate paleocoordinates: 46.8°N 88.0°W
- Region: Utah
- Country: United States
- Extent: ~140 km (87 mi)

Type section
- Named for: North Horn Mountain
- North Horn Formation (the United States) North Horn Formation (Utah)

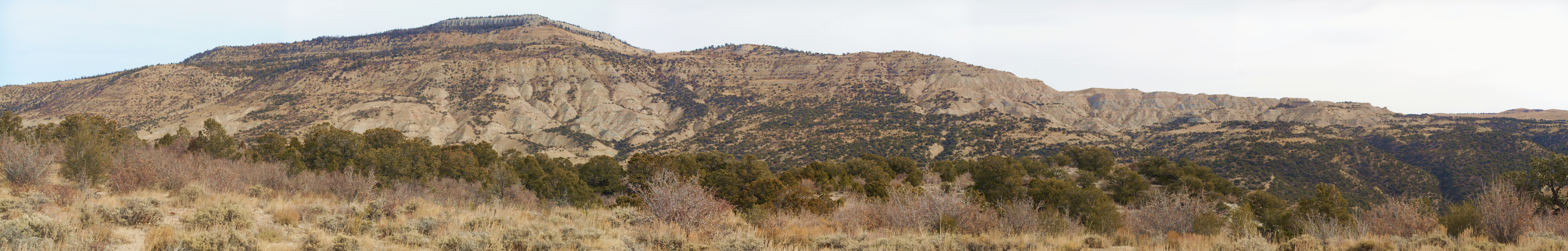
North Horn Formation on the west face of North Horn Mountain, Emery County, Utah.

The North Horn Formation is a widespread non-marine sedimentary unit with extensive outcrops exposed in central and eastern Utah. The formation locally exceeds 3,600 feet (1,100 m) in thickness and is characterized by fluvial, lacustrine, and floodplain dominated systems, representing a terrestrial, high energy, depositional environment. The sediments date from Late Cretaceous (Maastrichtian) to early Paleocene in age and include the K-Pg extinction event boundary; however, this boundary is extremely difficult to locate and there is no strong stratigraphic evidence available that indicates a specific marker bed such as an iridium rich clay layer. Thus far, the only visible evidence is represented in the form of faunal turnover from dinosaur to mammal-dominated fossil assemblages. Taxa from the Cretaceous part of the formation include squamates, testudines, choristoderes, crocodyliforms, sharks, bony fishes, amphibians, mammals, dinosaurs, eggshell fragments, trace fossils, mollusks, plant macrofossils, such as wood fragments, and palynomorphs.

== Stratigraphy ==
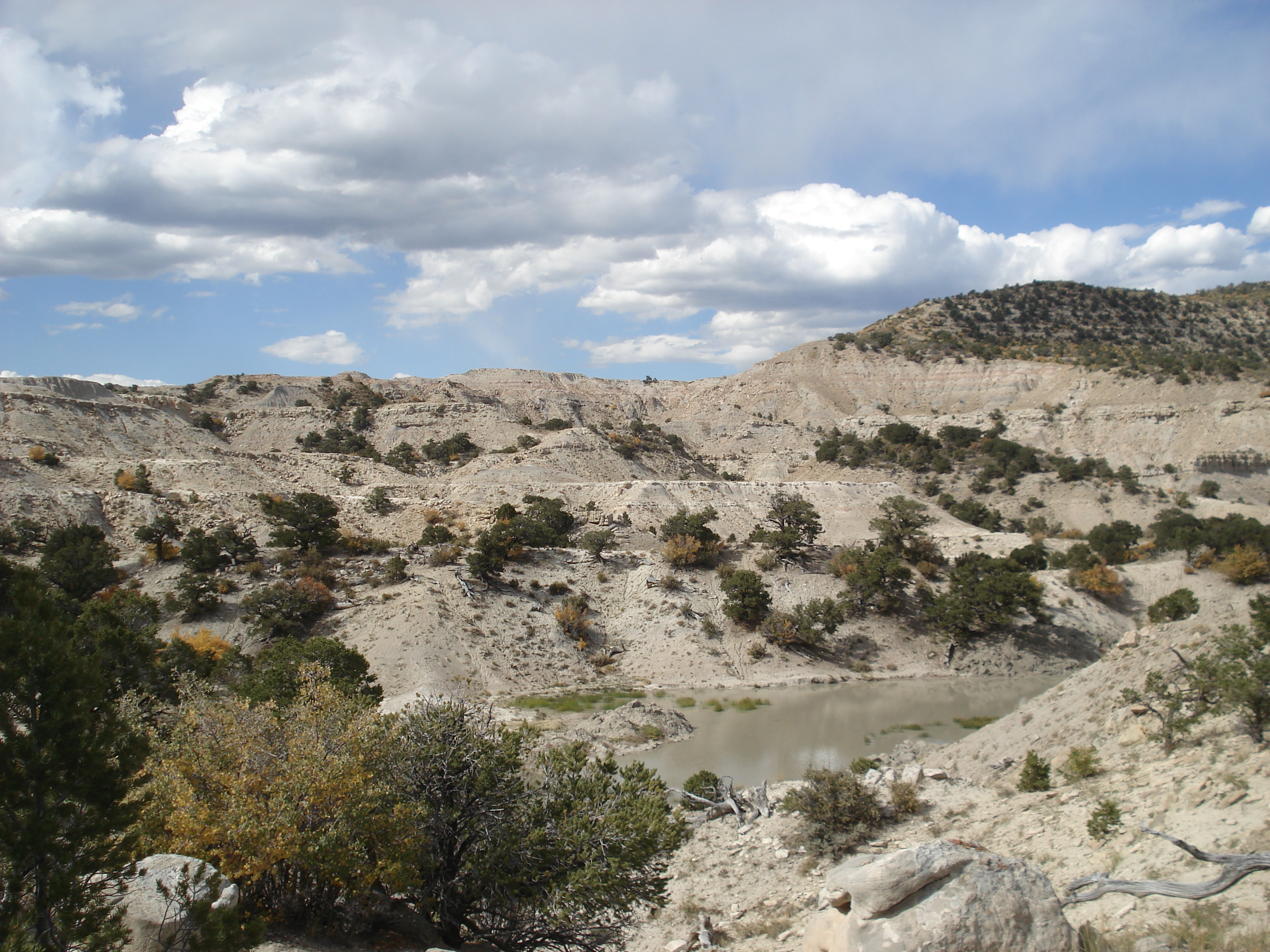
Type locality for the North Horn Formation on North Horn Mountain, Emery County, Utah

The North Horn Formation is a non-marine, stratigraphic unit located in east and central Utah which unconformably overlies the Late Cretaceous Price River Formation west of the San Rafael Swell, and the Tuscher Formation east of the swell. The formation is overlain by the late Paleocene-early Eocene Flagstaff Formation, also called the Flagstaff Limestone. The North Horn type section is located on North Horn Mountain in Emery County, Utah. Laterally, the North Horn Formation nearly spans an 87-mile (140 km) long east–west transect that extends from the Wasatch Plateau on the west and the Book Cliffs, near Green River, on the east, separated in the middle by the San Rafael Swell. The North Horn Formation varies greatly in thickness and lithology, representing a time transgressive stratigraphic sequence, which means that the age of the base and top of the formation changes as one moves laterally. West of the San Rafael Swell, near Price Canyon, Utah, the basal contact for the North Horn Formation is Maastrichtian (latest Cretaceous) in age, whereas its base is Paleocene in age on the eastern side of the swell. Some of the most complete sections of the North Horn Formation are exposed west of the San Rafael Swell at North Horn Mountain in which the local stratigraphy sometimes exceeds 3,600 ft (1,100 m) in thickness. Further to the east, towards Green River, Utah, stratigraphic sections are significantly thinner compared to sections in the west with thicknesses varying between as little as 50 to 130 ft (15 to 40 m).

== Subdivisions ==
The formation is divided into three informal units based on broad but distinct lithological characteristics. These units include the lower variegated unit at the base, a middle coal unit (in which the K-Pg boundary is located), and the upper variegated unit at the top. The units themselves are further divided into a total of eight sub-units, or lithofacies, based on facies scale lithological features. A detailed sedimentary study of the North Horn Formation was conducted by Lawton et al. These units, from oldest to youngest, include a 330 ft (100 m) thick basal conglomerate unit that consists of an upward fining conglomerates and sandstone and lacks any interbedded shale, followed by the lower redbed unit, a 790 ft (240 m) thick sequence dominated by red sandy siltstone, conglomerate, and pebbly sandstone. The third unit is the sheet sandstone unit and is composed of sheetlike sandstone beds that are interbedded with gray and carbonaceous siltstones. Some limestone beds are present but are uncommon. The fourth unit is characterized by 131 to 374 ft (40 to 114 m) thick coal beds and coal-streaked siltstone deposits and are referred to as the coal-bearing unit. This unit is overlain by a 833 ft (254 m) thick sequence of primarily calcareous siltstone beds, called the calcareous siltstone unit. The big mountain unit consists of nearly 750 feet (230 m) of interbedded conglomerates and trough cross bedded sandstones, followed by a 200 ft (60 m) thick set of strata composed of sandstone, pebbly sandstone, and conglomerates which make up the coal canyon unit. The uppermost unit is the upper redbed unit, which is nearly a 390 ft (120 m) thick and is composed of red brown mottled siltstone and sandy siltstone.

== Paleontology ==
Characteristic dinosaur taxa include the ceratopsian Torosaurus utahensis, the titanosaurian sauropod Utetitan zellaguymondeweyae, and the theropod Tyrannosaurus rex; however, the most frequently occurring taxon in the Cretaceous strata of the North Horn Formation is the lizard Polyglyphanodon. Dinosaur footprints have been found here. Fauna recorded from Paleocene strata within the formation appear to be far more diverse and over 70 different taxa have been identified, including frogs, numerous multituberculate, protoeutherian, periptychid, arctocyonid and phenacodontid mammals, crocodyliforms, choristoderes, trace fossils, and palynomorphs. Marsupial remains similar to Alphadon and Eodelphis have also been found here as well.

Pterodactyloid tracks present at an unnamed site. The specimens are kept at the Dinosaur Tracks Museum, of the University of Colorado at Denver. Bird and dinosaur eggs have also been found at the site, along with unidentified hadrosaur fossils (possibly from Edmontosaurus or Kritosaurus).

=== Fossil content ===
Color key: Taxon / Reclassified taxon / Taxon falsely reported as present / Dubious taxon or junior synonym / Ichnotaxon / Ootaxon / Morphotaxon	Notes; Uncertain or tentative taxa are in small text; ~~crossed out~~ taxa are discredited.

==== Tetrapods ====
Tetrapods of the North Horn Formation
Genus	Species	Location	Time	Abundance	Notes	Image
Adocus	A. sp.		Maastrichtian			Adocus
Alphadon	A. sp.		Maastrichtian			Alphadon
Anura	Indeterminate		Maastrichtian	An incomplete articulated specimen (OMNH 27756)	A frog with a snout-vent length no greater than 25 mm. Differs from named species of North American Lancian frogs, but bears resemblance to bones from the Hell Creek and Lance formations identified as Eopelobates sp. This is the only articulated frog specimen from the Lancian.	
Aspideretes	"A." sp.		Maastrichtian			
Atoposauridae	Indeterminate		Maastrichtian			
Basilemys	B. sp.		Maastrichtian			Basilemys
Champsosaurus	C. sp.		Maastrichtian-Danian			Champsosaurus
Cimolomys	C. sp.		Maastrichtian			
Compsemys	C. victa & C. sp.		Maastrichtian-Danian			
Eutheria	Indeterminate		Maastrichtian			
Hadrosauridae	Indeterminate		Maastrichtian			
Kritosaurini	Indeterminate		Maastrichtian	A dentary (BYU 9432)		
Leptochamops	cf. L. sp.		Maastrichtian			
Mesodma	M. sp. (cf. M. hensleighi)		Maastrichtian			
Paracimexomys	P. sp.		Maastrichtian			
Paraglyphanodon	P. utahensis & P. gazini		Maastrichtian			
Pediomys	P. sp.		Maastrichtian			
Pinacosuchus	P. mantiensis		Maastrichtian			
Pholidosauridae	Indeterminate		Maastrichtian			
Polyglyphanodon	P. sternbergi		Maastrichtian			Polyglyphanodon
Protolambda	P. hatcheri		Maastrichtian		Previously identified as a species of Pediomys	
Pteraichnus		Found at an unnamed site.	Maastrichtian		Specimens kept at the Dinosaur Tracks Museum, of the University of Colorado at Denver.	
Torosaurus	T. utahensis		Maastrichtian			Torosaurus
Troodontidae	Indeterminate		Maastrichtian			Troodon
Tyrannosaurus	T. rex		Maastrichtian			
Utetitan	U. zellaguymondeweyae		Maastrichtian		Originally referred to Alamosaurus sanjuanensis	Utetitan

==== Fish ====
Fishes of the North Horn Formation
Genus	Species	Location	Time	Abundance	Notes	Image
Amiidae	Indeterminate		Maastrichtian			
Ischyrhiza	I. sp.		Maastrichtian			Ischyrhiza
Lepisosteus	L. sp.		Maastrichtian-Danian	Scales and teeth		Lepisosteus
Myledaphus	M. bipartitus		Maastrichtian			Myledaphus
Pycnodontidae	Indeterminate		Maastrichtian			Pycnodus
Squatirhina	S. americana		Maastrichtian			

== See also ==
- List of dinosaur-bearing rock formations
- Kaiparowits Formation
