= Pelsochamops =

Pelsochamops Temporal range: Santonian, 85 Ma

Scientific classification
- Domain: Eukaryota
- Kingdom: Animalia
- Phylum: Chordata
- Class: Reptilia
- Order: Squamata
- Clade: †Polyglyphanodontia
- Genus: †Pelsochamops; Makádi, 2013
- Species: †P. infrequens

Binomial name
- †Pelsochamops infrequens Makádi, 2013

Extinct genus of lizards

Pelsochamops is an extinct genus of Chamopsiid lizard, containing the single species P. infrequens from the Santonian aged Csehbánya Formation of Hungary, known from a partial dentary and maxilla fragments. It is the first chamopsiid known from Europe, the rest being known from North America.
