= Hekou Formation =

Geologic formation in China

- Stratigraphic range: Late Cretaceous, ?Maastrichtian
- Type: Geological formation
- Unit of: Guifeng Group
- Underlies: Tangbian Formation
- Overlies: Unconformity: Zhoutian Formation

Lithology
- Primary: Conglomerate, glutenite
- Other: Sandstone, siltstone, tuff

Location
- Region: Jiangxi Province, Asia
- Country: China

The Hekou Formation is a Cretaceous geologic formation in China. Pterosaur fossils have been recovered from the formation. It is a unit of the Guifeng Group and dates to the Late Cretaceous. Dinosaur fossils from the formation include a nearly perfect oviraptorid embryo nicknamed Baby Yingliang, an unnamed large hadrosaurid, and hadrosauroid eggs with embryos. Other reptiles include the alligatoroid Eurycephalosuchus and the polyglyphanodontian lizards Xenodontolacerta and Yechilacerta. The mammal Erythrobaatar and Yubaatar qianzhouensis have also been described from the formation.

== Description ==
The Hekou Formation is a constituent of the Guifeng Group; a sequence of formations that were deposited in the Xinjiang Basin, including the Hekou, Tangbian, and Lianhe formations, which record aeolian-alluvial interactions in a palaeoplateau desert. Both a successional and coeval model of the deposition of these units have been proposed, with estimated ages of the Hekou formation ranging from Coniacian-Santonian to Maastrichtian. The coeval model postulates that the Hekou, Tangbian and Lianhe formations were deposited around the same time, although its still not certain. The associated facies include alluvial fans and adjacent wadi river channels, with mudcracks indicating subaerial exposure of the deposits. Oxygen-18 isotope values recorded in Dinosaur eggshells indicated low annual precipitation and humidity, suggesting an arid to semi-arid environment. The occurrence of striated cobbles in the alluvial facies suggests glacial activity in the catchment areas of the Cretaceous plateau. Subsequent research has reinterpreted many of the vertebrate fossils from the Nanxiong Formation as instead coming from the Hekou Formation, with the "Nanxiong Formation" instead equivalent to the Guifeng Group. In the Yudu district, the boundaries between the Hekou, Tangbian, and Lianhe formations are unclear, leading some researchers to merge these strata into a single unit, referred to as the Hekou Formation.

== See also ==
- List of pterosaur-bearing stratigraphic units
- List of dinosaur-bearing stratigraphic units
