= Csehbánya Formation =

Geologic formation in Hungary

- Stratigraphic range: Late Santonian, ~85–84 Ma
- Type: Geological formation
- Underlies: Jákó Marl Formation, localized unconformity with Eocene Iharkút Conglomerate present in some areas
- Overlies: Unconformity with Upper Triassic Main Dolomite Formation and Upper Cretaceous Nagytárkány Bauxite Formation
- Area: Transdanubian Mountains
- Thickness: Varies, but up to 100–150 m (330–490 ft)

Lithology
- Primary: Siltstone, sandstone conglomerate
- Other: Claystone

Location
- Coordinates: 47.24°N 17.64°E
- Approximate paleocoordinates: 31.0°N 18.6°E
- Region: Europe
- Country: Hungary

Type section
- Named for: Csehbánya, Hungary
- Csehbánya Formation (Hungary)

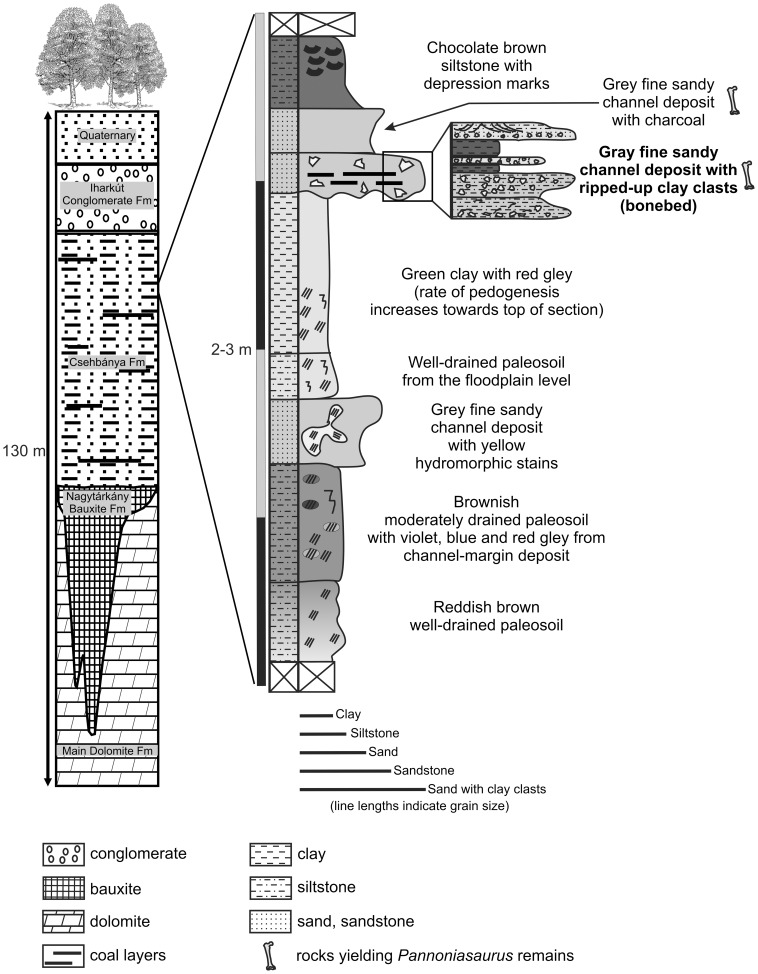
Stratigraphy of the Iharkút locality

The Csehbánya Formation is a geological formation in the Transdanubian Mountains of Veszprém County, Hungary. The formation dates to the Late Santonian (around 85-84 million years ago) of the Late Cretaceous. It represents a floodplain environment as opposed to the swampy lacustrine environment of the simultaneous Ajka Coal Formation, though there is complete overlap in terms of fauna. It underlies the Jákó Marl Formation, and laterally transitions to the Ajka Coal Formation.

== Geology ==
The lithology of the unit is a cyclic variation of conglomerate, sandstone, variegated siltstone, clay and marl layers with some sporadic thin coal seams. It is unconformably overlies the Late Triassic Main Dolomite Formation, which has deposits of the Upper Cretaceous Nagytárkány Bauxite Formation within deep karstic sinkholes in the formation. There is a basal conglomerate of dolomite clasts at the base of the Csehbánya formation. The main exposed portion of the formation is called the Iharkút locality, which is a disused bauxite quarry. At this location due to Paleogene uplift, it is unconformably overlain by the Lutetian Ikharkút Conglomerate. In the upper levels of the formation, there are sandstone lens beds present, which represent channel bodies. These are indicative of an anastomosing fluvial system. The exposure at this locality is between 100 and 150 m. Most of the fossils are found within the SZ-6 site at the locality, which is interpreted as a lag channel deposit

== Invertebrate paleofauna ==
Amber is known from both the Ajka Coal and Csehbánya Formations, and is commonly referred to as ajkait. However most of the arthropod inclusions in these are undescribed, only being shown in photographs, with only two species of Ceratopogonids (biting midges) in the extant genus Leptoconops and the extinct genus Adelohelea being described. A list of known taxa is given below.

Invertebrates
Genus	Species	Location	Stratigraphic position	Abundance	Notes	Images
Adelohelea	A. magyarica				Biting midge	
Leptoconops	L. clava				Biting midge, genus currently extant	
Coleoptera	Indeterminate					
Diptera	Indeterminate					
Hymenoptera	Indeterminate					
Nematocera	Indeterminate					

== Vertebrate paleofauna ==
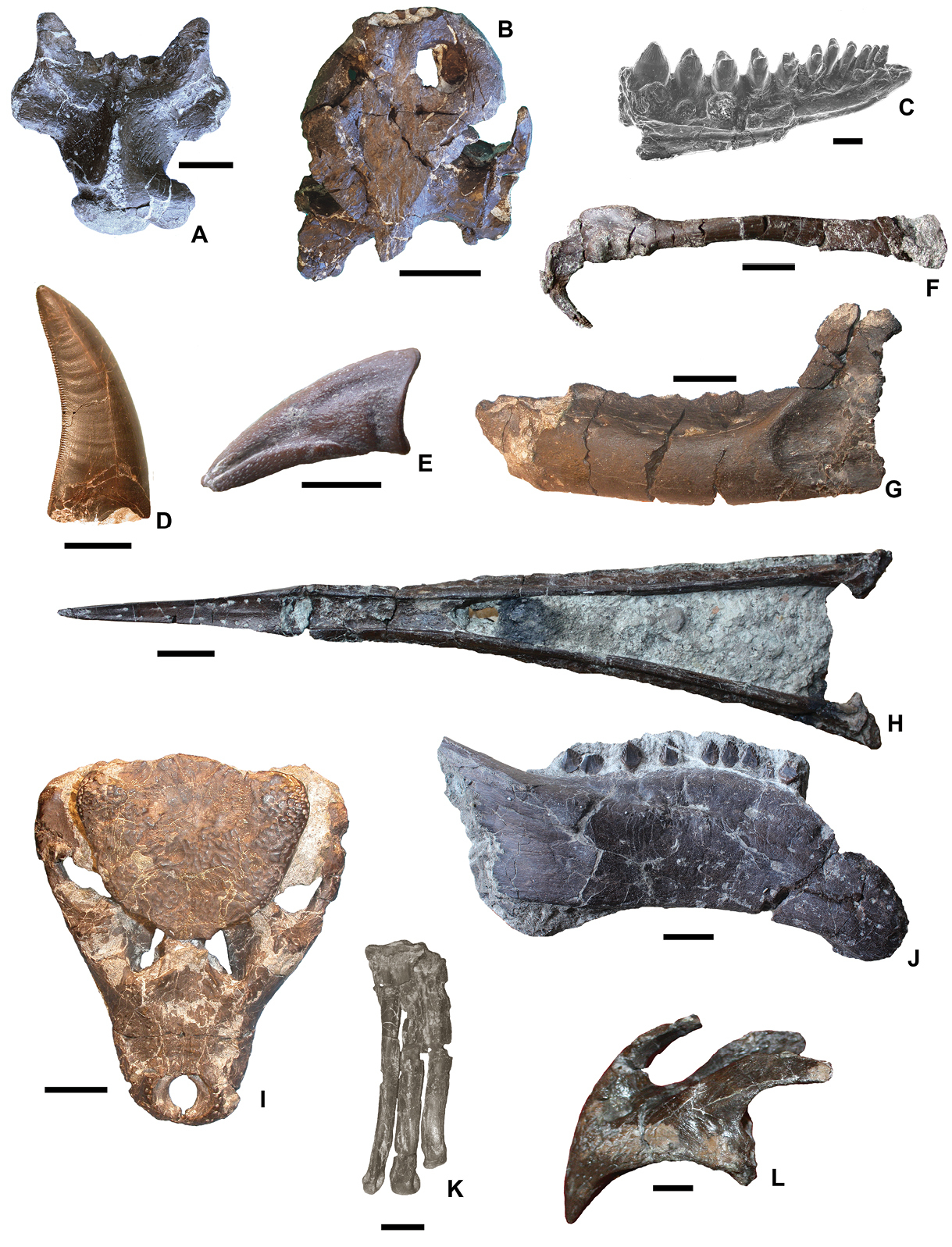
Various fossils from the Csehbánya Formation

Fishes, amphibians, turtles, squamates, crocodilians, dinosaurs and pterosaurs present in Veszprém, Hungary, near the village of Németbánya in the Iharkút locality, an open-pit bauxite mine. Other finds include Abelisauridae indet., Rhabdodontidae indet., Tetanurae indet. Coprolites and eggshells are also known from the locality.

=== Fish ===
Fish
Genus	Species	Location	Stratigraphic position	Abundance	Notes	Images
Atractosteus	Indeterminate	Iharkút locality		"Jaw fragments, teeth, scales, vertebrae"	Gar, genus extant	
Coelodus	Indeterminate			Possible dentary/premaxilla, vomers, prearticulars, teeth and possible scales	Pycnodontiform	
Polazzodus	P. mihalyfii				A pycnodontid pycnodont	
Vidalamiinae	Indeterminate			"Two vertebrae"		
Amiidae	Indeterminate			A left anterior ceratohyal and a vertebra		
Elopiformes	Indeterminate			13 vertebrae		
Ellimmichthyiformes	Indeterminate			At least two distinct taxa represented by four and one vertebrae	Clupeimorph	
cf. Salmoniformes	Indeterminate			two vertebrae		
Acanthomorpha	Indeterminate			Three vertebrae and 18 fin spines		
Teleostei	Indeterminate			Teeth, vertebrae and cycloid scales		
Actinopterygii	Indeterminate			9 distinct teeth morphotypes and some teeth bearing elements		

=== Amphibians ===
Amphibians
Genus	Species	Location	Stratigraphic position	Abundance	Notes	Images
Albanerpeton	Indeterminate	Iharkút locality		Skull and jaw elements	Albanerpetontid	
Bakonybatrachus	B. fedori	Iharkút locality		Pelvic elements	Discoglossid frog	
Hungarobatrachus	H. szukacsi	Iharkút locality		Pelvic elements	Advanced frog	
Palaeobatrachidae	Indeterminate	Iharkút locality		Postcranial remains		
Pelobatidae	Indeterminate	Iharkút locality		Postcranial remains		

=== Squamates ===
Squamates
Genus	Species	Location	Stratigraphic position	Abundance	Notes	Images
Bicuspidon	B. aff. hatzegiensis			Fragmentary mandibles, maxillae	Polyglyphanodontid	
Chromatogenys	C. tiliquoides			Partial right mandible	Scincomorph	
Distortodon	D. rhomboideus			Dentaries, maxilla	Polyglyphanodontid	
Pannoniasaurus	P. inexpectatus			Partial skeleton	Mosasaur, also known from Ajka Coal Formation	
Pelsochamops	P. infrequens			Fragmentary dentary, dentary fragments	Chamopsiid	
Scincomorpha	Indeterminate			Fragmentary dentaries	At least 3 distinct taxa, 4 mentioned in paper, but unsure if this counts Chromatogenys	

=== Crocodyliformes ===
Crocodyliformes of the Csehbánya Formation
Genus	Species	Location	Stratigraphic position	Abundance	Notes	Images
Iharkutosuchus	I. makadii			"Complete and partial skulls, mandibles, various cranial elements, teeth"	Hylaeochampsid	
Doratodon	D. carcharidens			"Teeth, Jaw fragment"		
?Theriosuchus	Indeterminate			"Teeth, cranial elements"		
?Allodaposuchus	Indeterminate			"Teeth, jaw fragments, cranial elements"		

=== Turtles ===
Turtles of the Csehbánya Formation
Genus	Species	Location	Stratigraphic position	Abundance	Notes	Images
Foxemys	F. trabanti			"Complete and partial skulls, mandibles, vertebrae, pectoral and pelvic girdle elements, limb bones, plastron and carapax fragments"		
Kallokibotion	Indeterminate			Shell fragments		
Dortokidae	Indeterminate			Shell fragments		

=== Pterosaurs ===
Pterosaurs of the Csehbánya Formation
Genus	Species	Location	Stratigraphic position	Abundance	Notes	Images
Bakonydraco	B. galaczi	Veszprém		"Premaxilla, complete mandible, 56 mandibular symphyses"	Tapejarid	
Azhdarchidae	Indeterminate			"Cervical vertebrae, pelvic girdle elements, limb bones"		
Pterodactyloidea	Indeterminate			"3 mandibular symphyses"		

=== Dinosaurs ===
Dinosaurs of the Csehbánya Formation
Genus	Species	Location	Stratigraphic position	Abundance	Notes	Images
Ajkaceratops	A. kozmai			Fused premaxillae and rostral bones, with fragments of the maxillae, four predentaries. Referred teeth.	A ceratopsian	
Bauxitornis	B. mindszentyae			Single right tarsometatarsus	Avisaurid enantiornithine	
Hungarosaurus	H. tormai	Veszprém		Several partial skeletons	Struthiosaurine nodosaur	cente
Pneumatoraptor	P. fodori	Veszprém		Single left scapulocoracoid	Paravian	
Struthiosaurus	Indeterminate			Humerus and partial hip, and pelvic armor elements.	Struthiosaurine nodosaur	
Abelisauridae	Indeterminate			Femur and pedal ungual phalanx		
Enantiornithes	Indeterminate			Limb bones		
Paraves	Indeterminate			"Teeth, caudals, limb bones"		
Sauropoda	Indeterminate			Single tooth		
Tetanurae	Indeterminate			More than 50 teeth		

== See also ==
- List of dinosaur-bearing rock formations
- List of fossiliferous stratigraphic units in Hungary
