= Tangbian Formation =

Late Cretaceous geological formation in China

- Stratigraphic range: Late Cretaceous, Campanian
- Type: Geological formation
- Unit of: Guifeng Group
- Underlies: Lianhe Formation
- Overlies: Hekou Formation
- Thickness: 240–3,060 m (790–10,040 ft)

Lithology
- Primary: purplish red sandstone, siltstone, and mudstone

Location
- Coordinates: 26°9′N 116°4′E
- Region: Jiangxi Province
- Country: China
- Tangbian Formation (China) Tangbian Formation (Jiangxi)

The Tangbian Formation is a geological formation in Jiangxi Province, east China. While its absolute age is uncertain, it has been estimated to represent Late Cretaceous (Campanian age) sediments. Dinosaur bones and eggs are among the fossils recovered from the formation.

== Geology and paleoenvironment ==
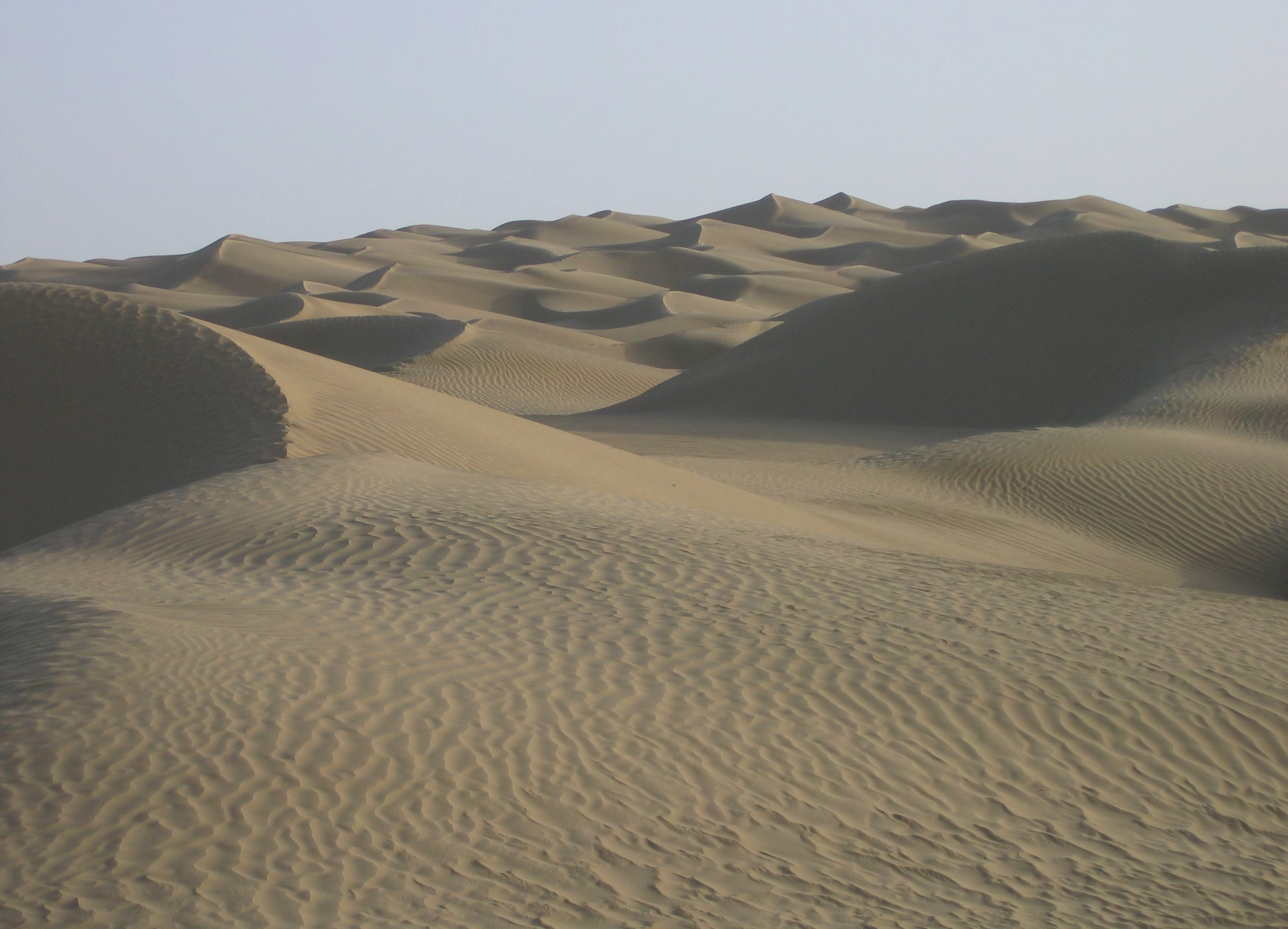
During the Cretaceous, the Tangbian Formation was an aeolian dune desert (modern Taklamakan Desert pictured)

The Tangbian Formation is known from outcrops in the Xinjiang Basin of Jiangxi Province, southeastern China. It is part of the Late Cretaceous Guifeng Group, underlain by the Hekou Formation and overlain by the Lianhe Formation in that group. The formation has been interpreted as Campanian in age, although absolute dates have not been obtained. It comprises thick beds of fine-grained red-purple sandstone interbedded with mudstone, calcareous sandstone, and siltstone, and was deposited in an aeolian (wind-driven) setting representing a desert environment.

== Fossil content ==
The Tangbian Formation contains a rich record of dinosaur egg fossils and embryos. Most of the known egg clutches can be associated with oviraptorosaurs, although rarer egg fossils are known from hadrosaurs, troodontids, and possibly dromaeosaurids.

Color key: Taxon / Reclassified taxon / Taxon falsely reported as present / Dubious taxon or junior synonym / Ichnotaxon / Ootaxon / Morphotaxon	Notes; Uncertain or tentative taxa are in small text; ~~crossed out~~ taxa are discredited.

=== Dinosaurs ===
Genus	Species	Region	Material	Notes	Images
Huanansaurus	H. ganzhouensis		A partial articulated skeleton preserved on a nest with eggs	An oviraptorid theropod dinosaur	
Huaxiazhoulong	H. shouwen	Longxi Village, Guangchang County	Partial well-preserved skeleton	An ankylosaurid dinosaur	

=== Ootaxa ===
Genus	Species	Region	Material	Notes	Images
Minioolithus	M. ganzhouensis	Meilin Village, Ganxian District	Clutch of six eggs	Classified as belonging to the Ovaloolithidae, likely laid by a theropod dinosaur	
Stromatoolithus	S. pinglingensis	Ganxian and Nankang districts	Eggshell fragments	Likely laid by a hadrosaurid dinosaur	

=== Other reptiles ===
Genus	Species	Region	Material	Notes	Images
Caninosaurus	C. ganzhouensis		Incomplete skull and mandible	A polyglyphanodont lizard	
