= Distortodon =

Distortodon Temporal range: Santonian, 85 Ma

Scientific classification
- Domain: Eukaryota
- Kingdom: Animalia
- Phylum: Chordata
- Class: Reptilia
- Order: Squamata
- Clade: †Polyglyphanodontia
- Genus: †Distortodon; Makádi, 2013
- Species: †D. rhomboideus

Binomial name
- †Distortodon rhomboideus Makádi, 2013

Extinct genus of lizards

Distortodon is an extinct genus of polyglyphanodont lizard from the Late Cretaceous of Europe, containing the species D. rhomboideus found in the Csehbánya Formation from the Santonian of Hungary. It is distinguished from other polyglyphanodonts by having a more distal lingual cusp, creating a distinctive rhomboidal shape in occlusal view.
