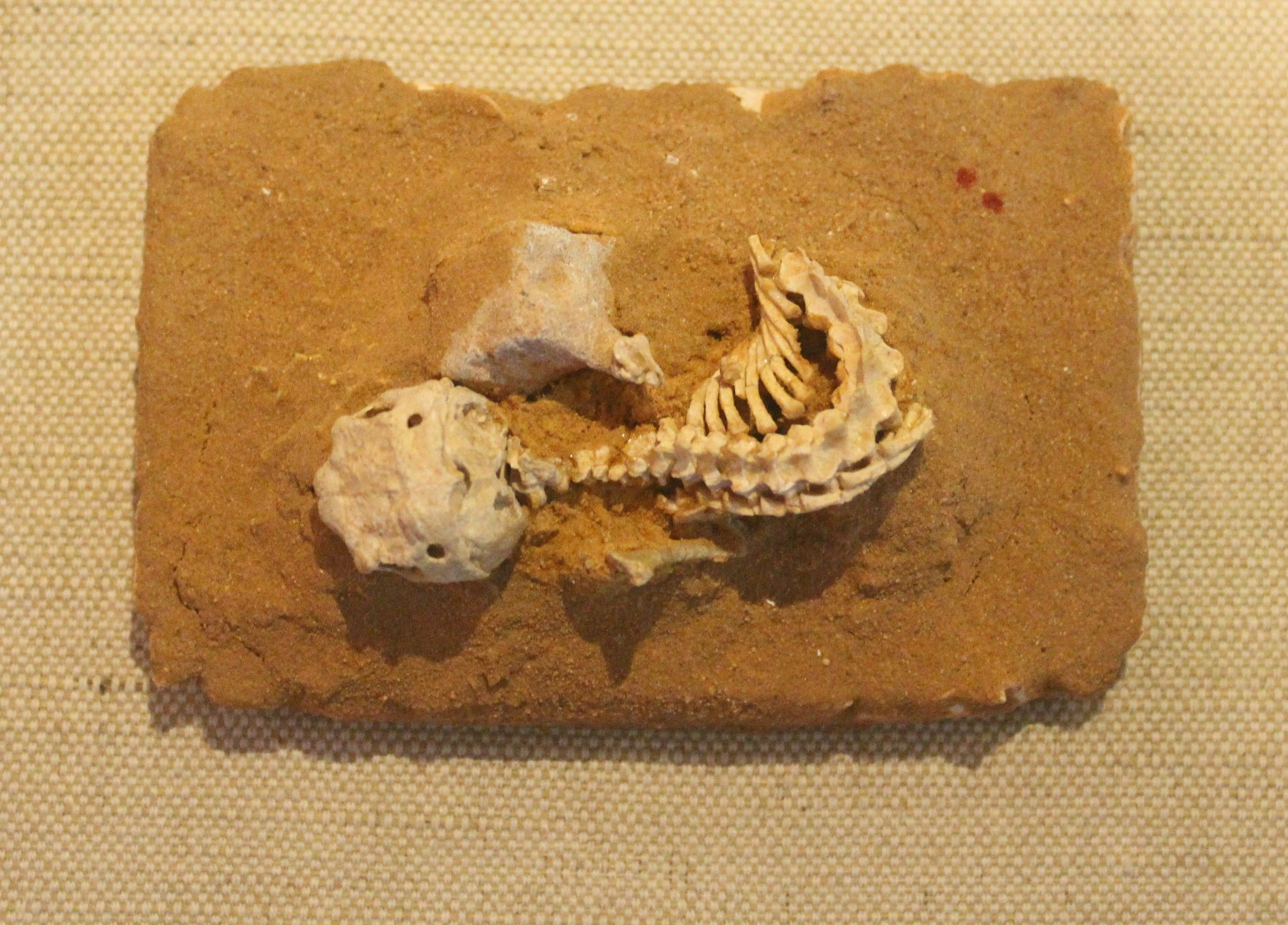
- Holotype, Paleozoological Museum of China

Scientific classification
- Kingdom: Animalia
- Phylum: Chordata
- Class: Reptilia
- Order: Squamata
- Genus: †Sineoamphisbaena; Wu et al., 1993

Species
- Sineoamphisbaenia hexatabularis, Wu et al., 1993

= Sineoamphisbaena =

Sineoamphisbaena Temporal range: Late Cretaceous

Extinct genus of reptiles

Sineoamphisbaena is an extinct genus of squamate of uncertain phylogenetic placement. Its fossils have been found in Late Cretaceous deposits in Inner Mongolia, China. It contains a single species, Sineoamphisbaenia hexatabularis.

== Taxonomic affiliation ==
Wu et al. and Gao proposed and argued that Sineoamphisbaenia was the oldest known amphisbaenian; this, however, was challenged by other authors, such as Kearney and Conrad, who instead assigned Sineoamphisbaena to the group of squamates variously known as Macrocephalosauridae, Polyglyphanodontidae or Polyglyphanodontia.

A large-scale study of fossil and living squamates published by Gauthier et al. in 2012 did not find evidence for a particularly close relationship between amphisbaenians and Sineoamphisbaena; in their primary analysis Sineoamphisbaena was found to be the sister taxon of the clade containing snakes, amphisbaenians, the family Dibamidae and the American legless lizard. The primary analysis of Gauthier et al. did not support a close relationship between Sineoamphisbaena and polyglyphanodontians either; however, the authors noted that when all snake-like squamates and mosasaurs were removed from the analysis, and burrowing squamates were then added individually to it, Sineoamphisbaena grouped with polyglyphanodontians. Gauthier et al. considered it possible that Sineoamphisbaena was a burrowing polyglyphanodontian.

== Sources ==
- World Encyclopedia of Dinosaurs & Prehistoric Creatures: The Ultimate Visual Reference To 1000 Dinosaurs And Prehistoric Creatures Of Land, Air And Sea ... And Cretaceous Eras (World Encyclopedia) by Dougal Dixon
