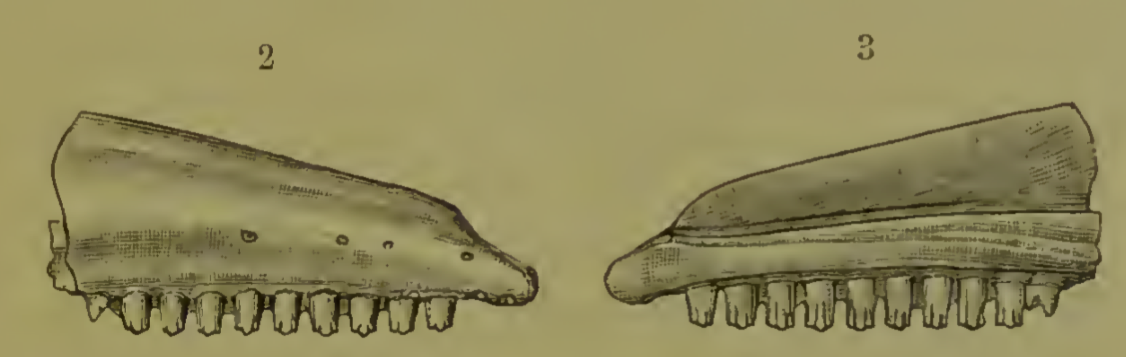
- Maxilla of the holotype seen from two different angles

Scientific classification
- Kingdom: Animalia
- Phylum: Chordata
- Class: Reptilia
- Order: Squamata
- Clade: †Polyglyphanodontia
- Genus: †Chamops; Marsh, 1892

Type species
- †Chamops segnis Marsh, 1892

Synonyms
- Alethesaurus (Gilmore, 1928); Lanceosaurus (Gilmore, 1928)

= Chamops =

Chamops Temporal range: Late Cretaceous-Early Eocene, 84.5–55 Ma Santonian-Ypresian

Extinct genus of lizards

Chamops is an extinct genus of polyglyphanodontian lizard from the Late Cretaceous-Early Eocene of North America. Fossils have been found in the Hell Creek Formation, Judith River Formation and Polecat Bench Formation of Montana, the Milk River Formation of Alberta, Canada and possibly also the Laramie Formation of Colorado. It is known from only one species, C. segnis. Unlike other polyglyphanodonts, Chamops had a more blunt snout. Chamops belonged to the Chamopsiid family of polyglyphanodontian lizards that lived in the Northern Hemisphere during the Late Cretaceous, although there are some possible Chamopsiid genera from South America and the Kem Kem Bone Beds in Morocco. It was originally thought Chamops and kin are related to whiptails, although it is now thought they are more closely related to iguanas.
