= Hungarobatrachus =

Hungarobatrachus Temporal range: Santonian

Scientific classification
- Kingdom: Animalia
- Phylum: Chordata
- Class: Amphibia
- Order: Anura
- Superfamily: Hyloidea
- Genus: †Hungarobatrachus; Szentesi & Venczel, 2010

Type species
- †H. szukacsi Szentesi & Venczel, 2010

Extinct genus of amphibians

Hungarobatrachus (meaning "Hungarian frog") is an extinct genus of advanced frog, which lived during the upper Cretaceous period (Santonian age) in what is now Hungary. It was described in 2010 from isolated ilia and tibio-fibulae recovered from the Iharkút locality in the Csehbánya Formation. This genus was named by Zoltán Szentesi and Márton Venczel in 2010, and the type species is Hungarobatrachus szukacsi. While originally interpreted as a member of Ranoidea, later studies based on new ilia and skull bones found it to be a member of Hyloidea or a possible australobatrachian.
