= Chromatogenys =

Chromatogenys Temporal range: Santonian, 85 Ma

Scientific classification
- Domain: Eukaryota
- Kingdom: Animalia
- Phylum: Chordata
- Class: Reptilia
- Order: Squamata
- Infraorder: Scincomorpha
- Genus: †Chromatogenys; Makádi & Nydam 2015
- Species: †C. tiliquoides

Binomial name
- †Chromatogenys tiliquoides Makádi & Nydam 2015

Extinct genus of lizards

Chromatogenys is an extinct genus of Scincomorph lizard from the Santonian of Hungary, containing the species C. tiliquoides. It is known from the Csehbánya Formation with the remains consisting of a partial right mandible, the name coming from the vibrant colours on the preserved specimen. The dentition is durophagous, and the animal likely ate hard shelled prey.
