= Bicuspidon =

Bicuspidon Temporal range: Cenomanian-Maastrichtian 100–66 Ma

Scientific classification
- Domain: Eukaryota
- Kingdom: Animalia
- Phylum: Chordata
- Class: Reptilia
- Order: Squamata
- Clade: †Polyglyphanodontia
- Genus: †Bicuspidon; Nydam and Cifelli, 2002

Type species
- Bicuspidon numerosus Nydam and Cifelli, 2002

Species
- List of species: B. numerosus Nydam and Cifelli, 2002; B. hatzegiensis Folie and Codrea, 2005; B. smikros Nydam, 2013; B. hogreli Vullo and Rage, 2018

Extinct genus of reptiles

Bicuspidon is an extinct genus of polyglyphanodont lizard known from the Late Cretaceous of North America, Europe and Africa, two species, B. numerosus and B. smikros are known from the Cenomanian of Utah in the Mussentuchit Member of the Cedar Mountain Formation and the Naturita Formation respectively. While B. hatzegiensis is known from the Maastrichtian Sânpetru Formation of Romania and B. hogreli is known from the Cenomanian Kem Kem Beds of Morocco. An indeterminate taxon closely related to B. hatzegiensis referred to as B. aff. hatzegiensis is known from the Santonian Csehbánya Formation of Hungary. The dentition is heterodont, with conical anterior teeth and transversely oriented bicuspid posterior teeth. Analysis of dental microwear and macrowear patterns and jaw and tooth morphology of Bicuspidon specimens from the Csehbánya Formation suggests that it had a diverse diet consisting of both soft and hard food items.
