= Kuwajimalla =

Kuwajimalla Temporal range: Early Cretaceous 146–100 Ma

Scientific classification
- Kingdom: Animalia
- Phylum: Chordata
- Class: Reptilia
- Order: Squamata
- Clade: †Polyglyphanodontia
- Genus: †Kuwajimalla; Evans & Manabe, 2008
- Species: †K. kagaensis

Binomial name
- †Kuwajimalla kagaensis Evans & Manabe, 2008

Extinct genus of lizards

Kuwajimalla kagaensis is an extinct species of plant-eating lizard from the Early Cretaceous Kuwajima Formation in Japan. The genus contains a single species, Kuwajimalla kagaensis, which was described in 2008 as being a member of the clade Polyglyphanodontia (=Borioteiioidea). In 2019, Alifanov reinterpreted it as a member of the family Dorsetisauridae.
