= Funiusaurus =

Funiusaurus Temporal range: Late Cretaceous, Maastrichtian

Scientific classification
- Kingdom: Animalia
- Phylum: Chordata
- Order: Squamata
- Clade: †Polyglyphanodontia
- Genus: †Funiusaurus; Xu et al., 2014
- Species: †F. luanchuanensis

Binomial name
- †Funiusaurus luanchuanensis Xu et al., 2014

Extinct lizard genus

Funiusaurus is an extinct genus of polyglyphanodontian lizard known from the Late Cretaceous Qiupa Formation of China. The genus contains a single species, Funiusaurus luanchuanensis. It was described in 2014 based on a single partial skull and mandible. A more complete skull and several fragmentary cranial and postcranial remains of this species were described in 2026.
