= Price River Formation =

Geologic formation in Utah, United States

- Stratigraphic range: Cretaceous
- Type: Formation

Lithology
- Primary: sandstone, siltstone

Location
- Region: Utah
- Country: United States

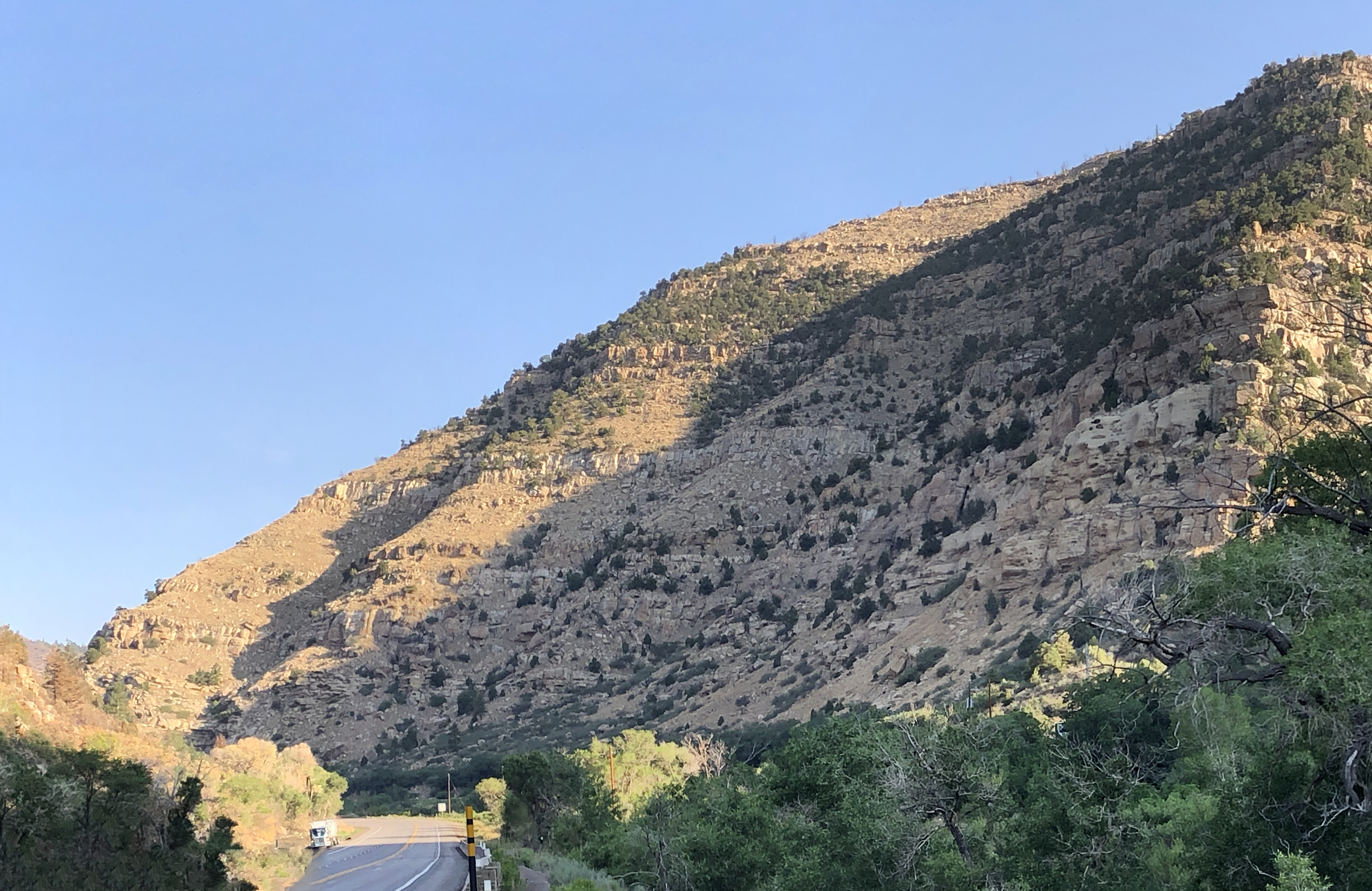
Price River Formation exposed in the canyon walls of Price Canyon, Carbon County, Utah. This is the general area for the type section.

The Price River Formation is a geologic formation in Utah. It preserves fossils dating back to the Cretaceous period. The Price River Formation is approximately 200 metres (660 ft) thick at its type locality (Price River Canyon) and consists of cliff-forming sandstone and siltstone visible in the Book Cliffs.

== Description ==
Irregularly bedded light-gray to gray, and grayish-brown to dark-gray beds of sheet sandstone, plus some beds of conglomerate and conglomeratic sandstone; sparse mudstone beds as well. The crossbedded sandstones are generally thin bedded to massive, and commonly thick bedded. Beds alternate irregularly to form steep, steplike slopes. Ranges in thickness from 9 to 75 m (30–250 ft). Fluvial in origin. This unit is equivalent, in part, to the Tuscher and Farrer Formations of the eastern Book Cliffs.

Fossil pollen (palynomorphs) indicate a late Campanian (Late Cretaceous) age .

== See also ==
- List of fossiliferous stratigraphic units in Utah
- Paleontology in Utah
