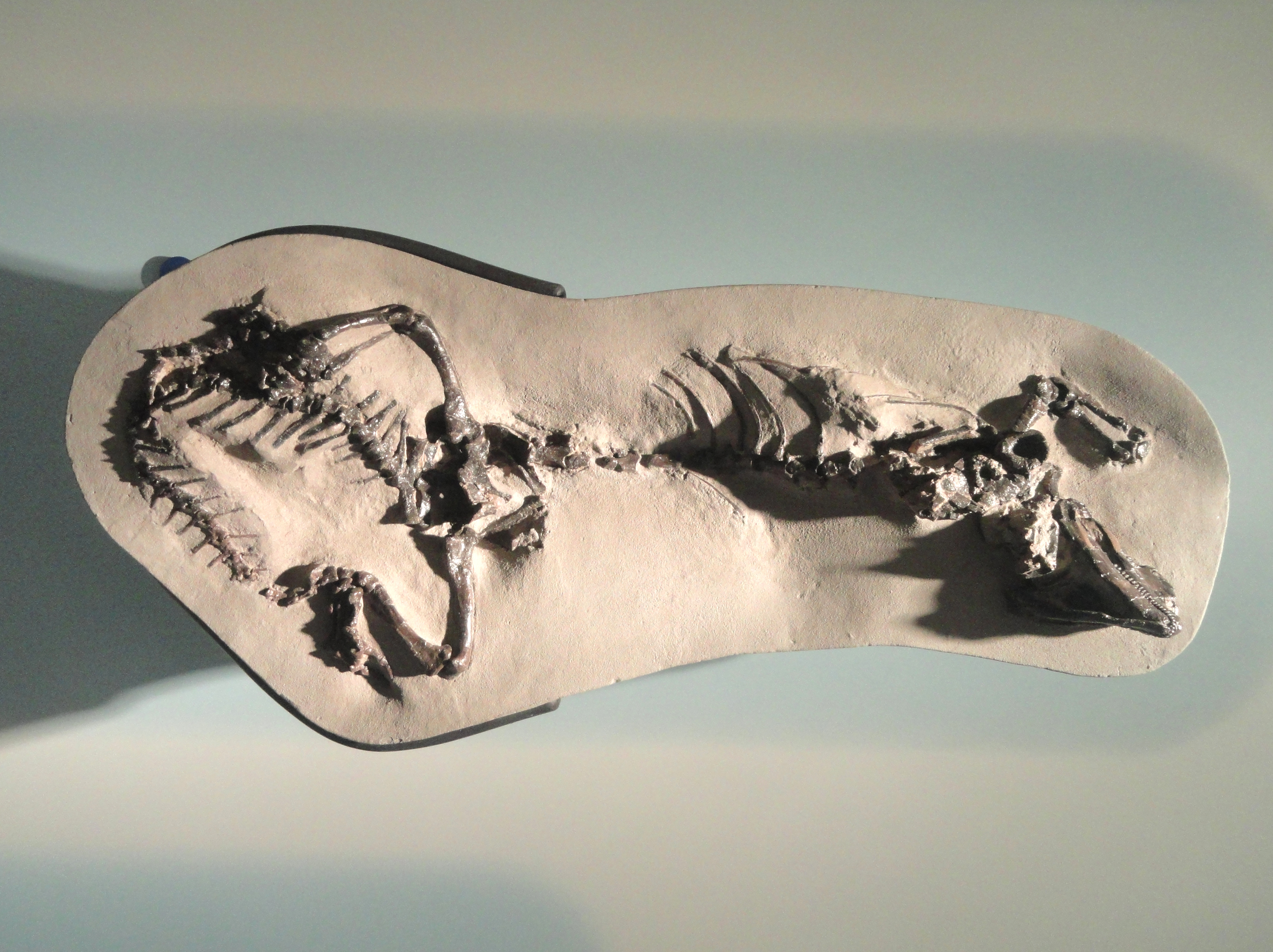
- Fossil of Polyglyphanodon sternbergi

Scientific classification
- Domain: Eukaryota
- Kingdom: Animalia
- Phylum: Chordata
- Class: Reptilia
- Order: Squamata
- Clade: †Polyglyphanodontia
- Genus: †Polyglyphanodon; Gilmore, 1940
- Species: †P. sternbergi

Binomial name
- †Polyglyphanodon sternbergi Gilmore, 1940

= Polyglyphanodon =

Polyglyphanodon Temporal range: Maastrichtian, 70.6–66 Ma

Extinct genus of lizards

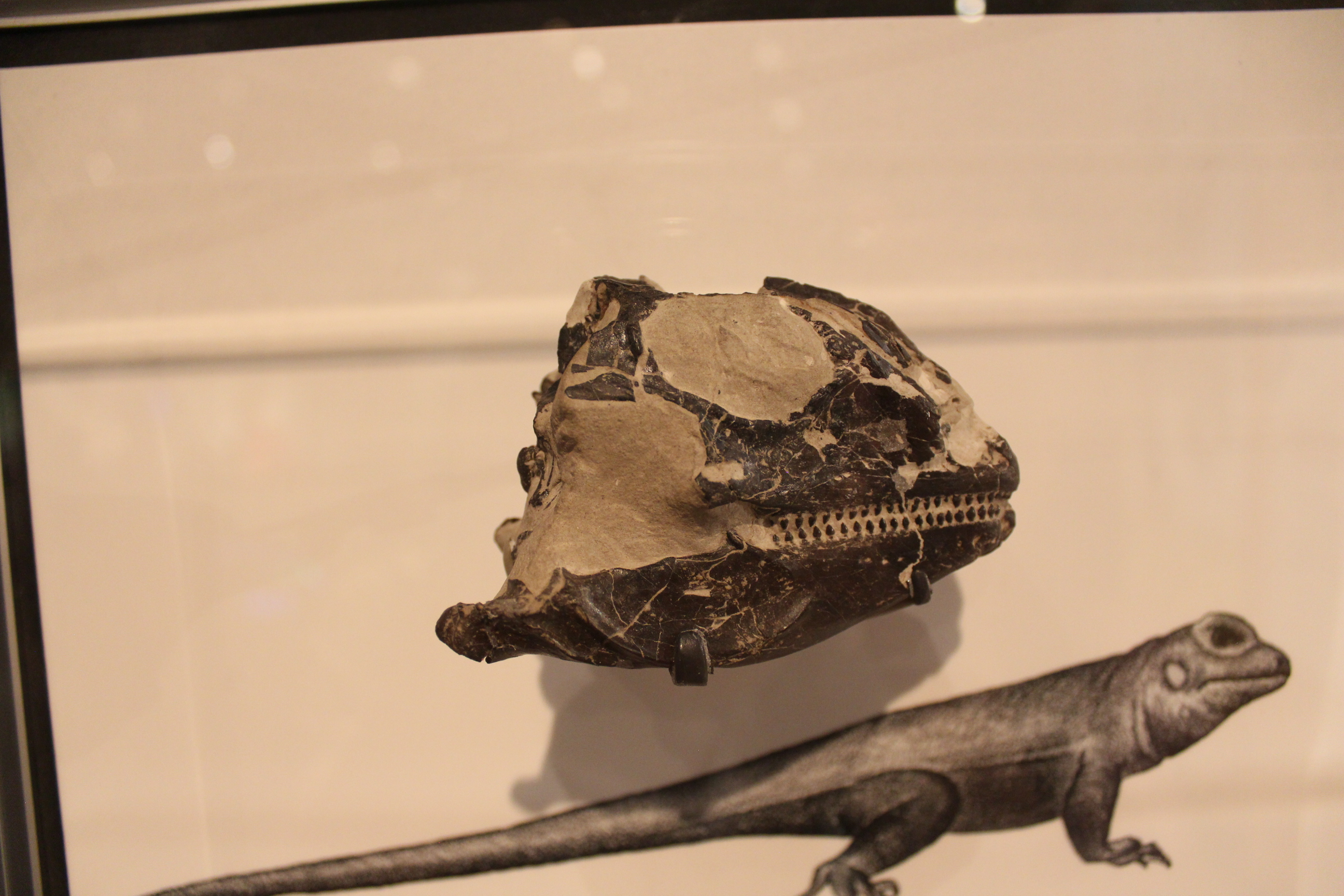
Skull and restoration at the National Museum of Natural History.

Polyglyphanodon is an extinct genus of polyglyphanodontid lizard containing the species P. sternbergi from the Maastrichtian aged North Horn Formation of Utah. The species is known from several mostly complete and partial skeletons. It is distinguished by its transversely orientated interlocking teeth, which suggest a herbivorous diet
