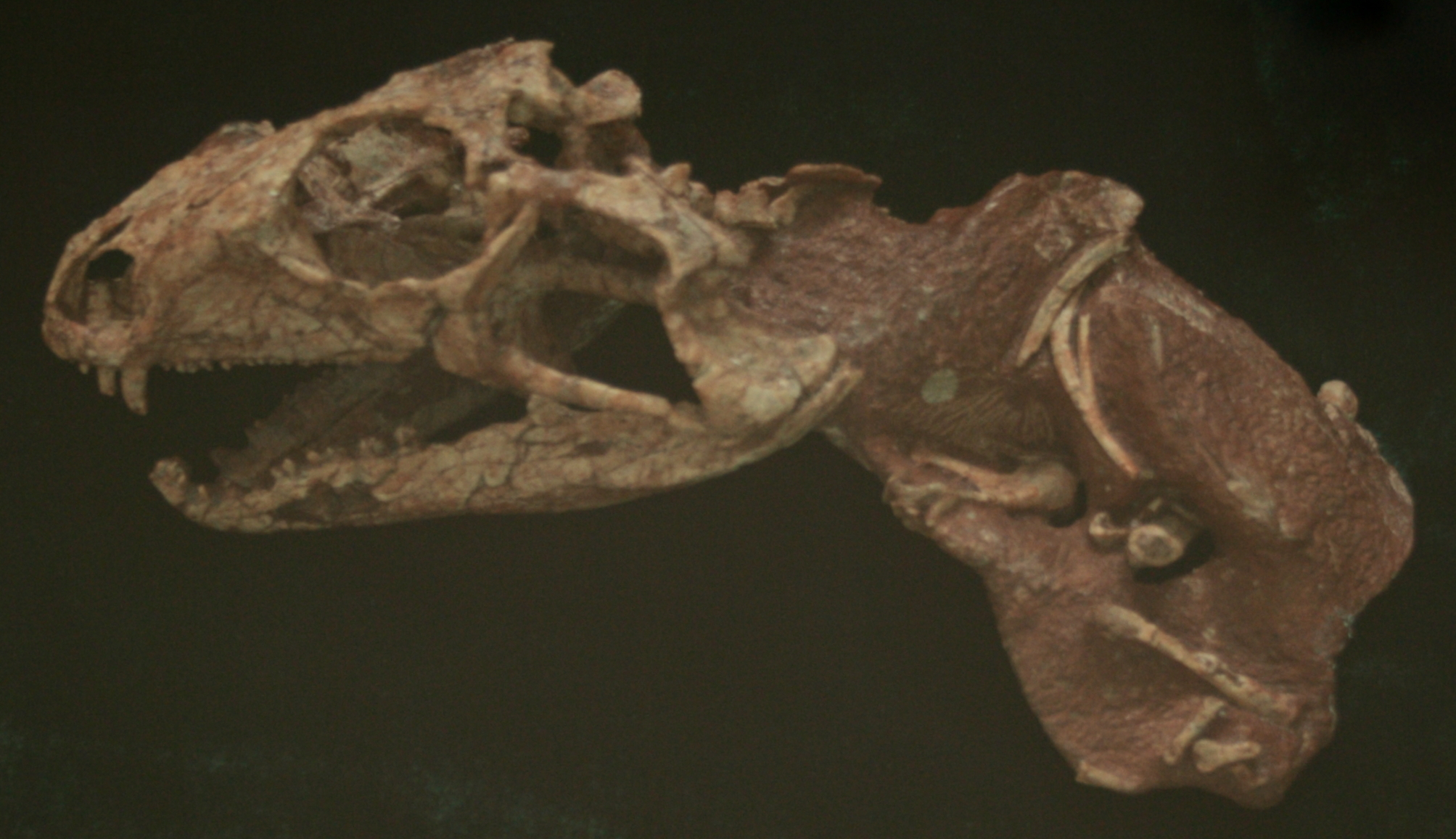

Scientific classification
- Kingdom: Animalia
- Phylum: Chordata
- Class: Reptilia
- Order: Squamata
- Clade: †Polyglyphanodontia
- Genus: †Tianyusaurus
- Species: †T. zhengi

Binomial name
- †Tianyusaurus zhengi Lü et al., 2008

= Tianyusaurus =

Tianyusaurus Temporal range: Maastrichtian

Extinct genus of lizards

Tianyusaurus is an extinct genus of polyglyphanodontian lizard that inhabited China during the Late Cretaceous. It contains the species T. zhengi.
