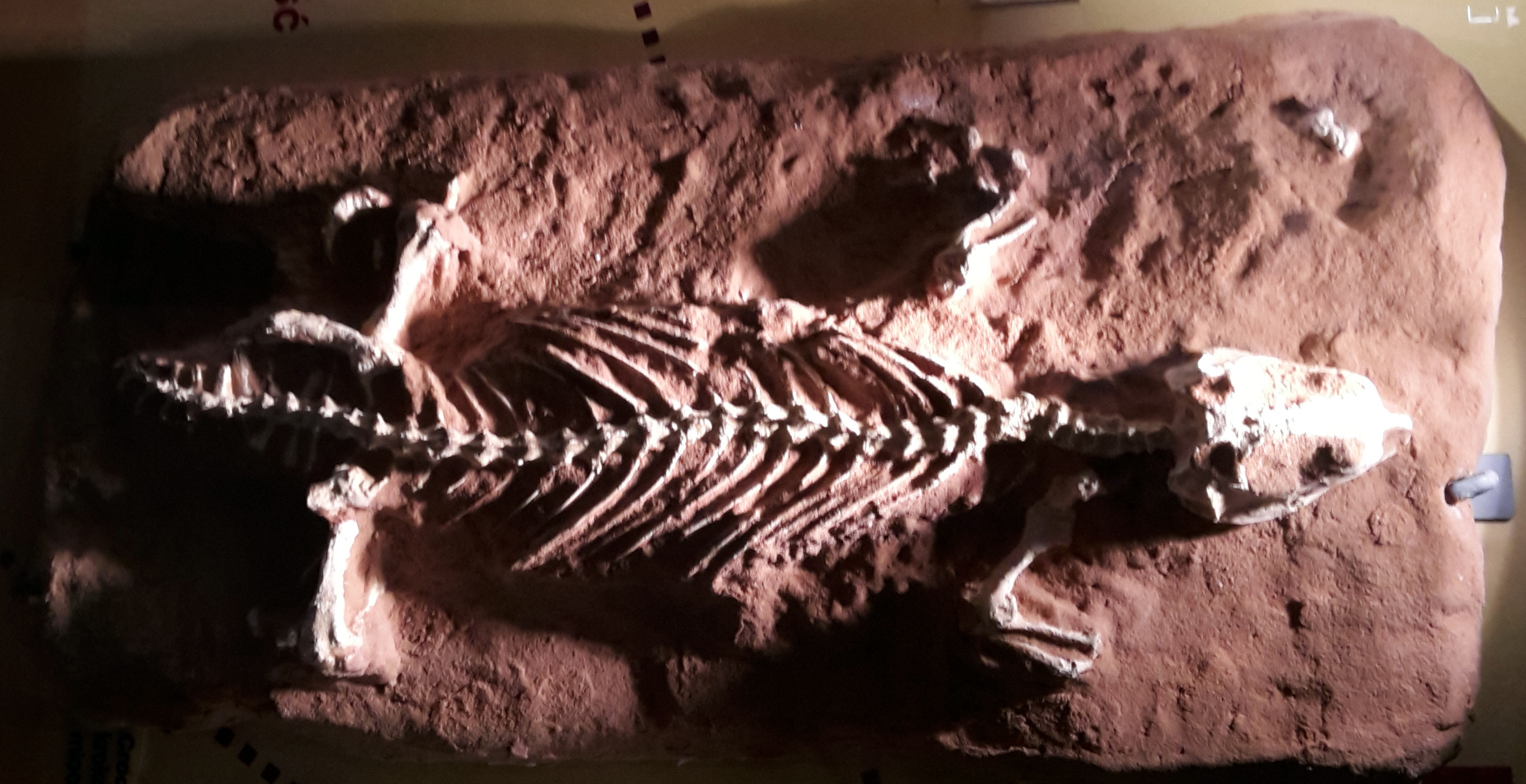
- G. chulsanensis skeleton, Museum of Evolution of Polish Academy of Sciences, Warsaw

Scientific classification
- Kingdom: Animalia
- Phylum: Chordata
- Class: Reptilia
- Order: Squamata
- Clade: †Polyglyphanodontia
- Genus: †Gilmoreteius; Langer, 1998

Species
- G. chulsanensis; G. ferrugenous; G. gilmorei; G. sulimskii

Synonyms
- Macrocephalosaurus

= Gilmoreteius =

Gilmoreteius Temporal range: Late Cretaceous

Extinct genus of lizards

Gilmoreteius is an extinct genus of polyglyphanodontian lizard from the Late Cretaceous period in Mongolia. It was probably herbivorous, possibly insectivorous. It was large for a polyglyphanodontian, with its skull being around 120 mm in length.
