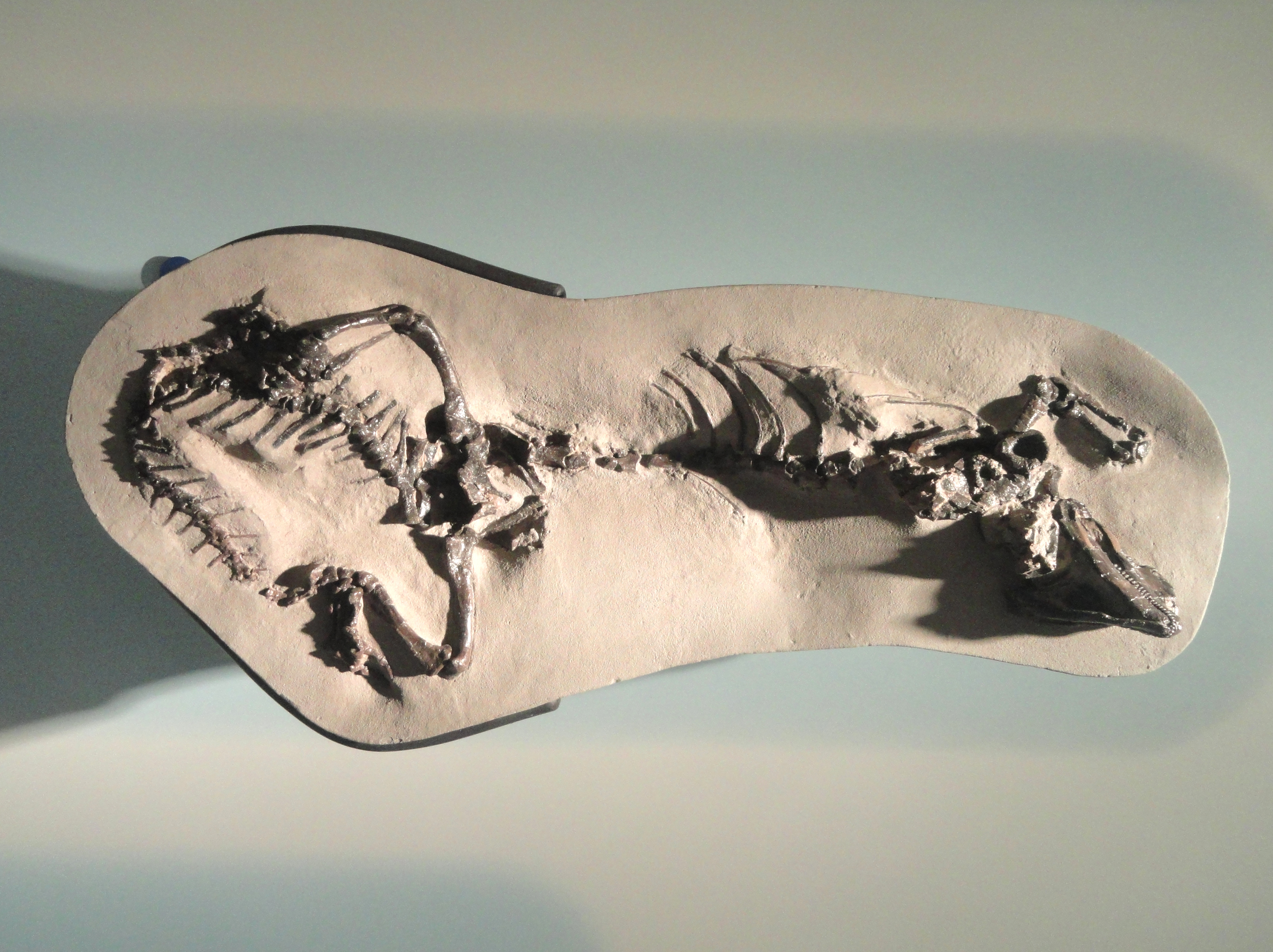
- Skeleton of the polyglyphanodontian Polyglyphanodon sternbergi

Scientific classification
- Kingdom: Animalia
- Phylum: Chordata
- Class: Reptilia
- Order: Squamata
- Clade: †Polyglyphanodontia; Alifanov, 2000

Synonyms
- Borioteiioidea Nydam et al., 2007

= Polyglyphanodontia =

Polyglyphanodontia Temporal range: Early Cretaceous-Late Cretaceous, Barremian–Maastrichtian

Extinct clade of lizards

Polyglyphanodontia, also known as the Borioteiioidea, is an extinct clade of Cretaceous lizards. Polyglyphanodontians were the dominant group of lizards in North America and Asia during the Late Cretaceous.

== Chronology and distribution ==
Most polyglyphanodontians are Late Cretaceous in age, with the highest diversity in the group being known from East Asia. The oldest polyglyphanodontian, Kuwajimalla kagaensis, is known from the Early Cretaceous Kuwajima Formation of Japan. The majority of known members of the group inhabited Laurasia; the group also included Gondwanan taxa Bicuspidon hogreli from the Kem Kem Beds of Morocco, Cryptobicuspidon pachysymphysealis from the Quiricó Formation of Brazil and Calanguban alamoi from the Crato Formation of Brazil, while Early Cretaceous South American taxon Tijubina, and possibly also Olindalacerta, might also fall within Polyglyphanodontia or be closely allied to the group. The group became extinct during the end-Cretaceous extinction event, the only major terrestrial squamate group to do so.

== Ecology ==
Polyglyphanodontians were morphologically diverse. Chamopsiids, including Chamops, from North America have tricuspid teeth, and were generally small in size. Members of the family Polyglyphanodontidae primarily known from Europe and North America (including Polyglyphanodon, Paraglyphanodon, Dicodon and Bicuspidon) have large teeth that are transversely orientated, and were likely herbivorous as well as possibly ominivorous. The family Gilmoreteiidae have iguana-like teeth, with some polyglyphanodontians known from Asia having conical teeth. Some gilmoreteiids developed a complete lower temporal bar similar to that found in the tuatara, but is otherwise unheard of in lizards.

== Classification ==
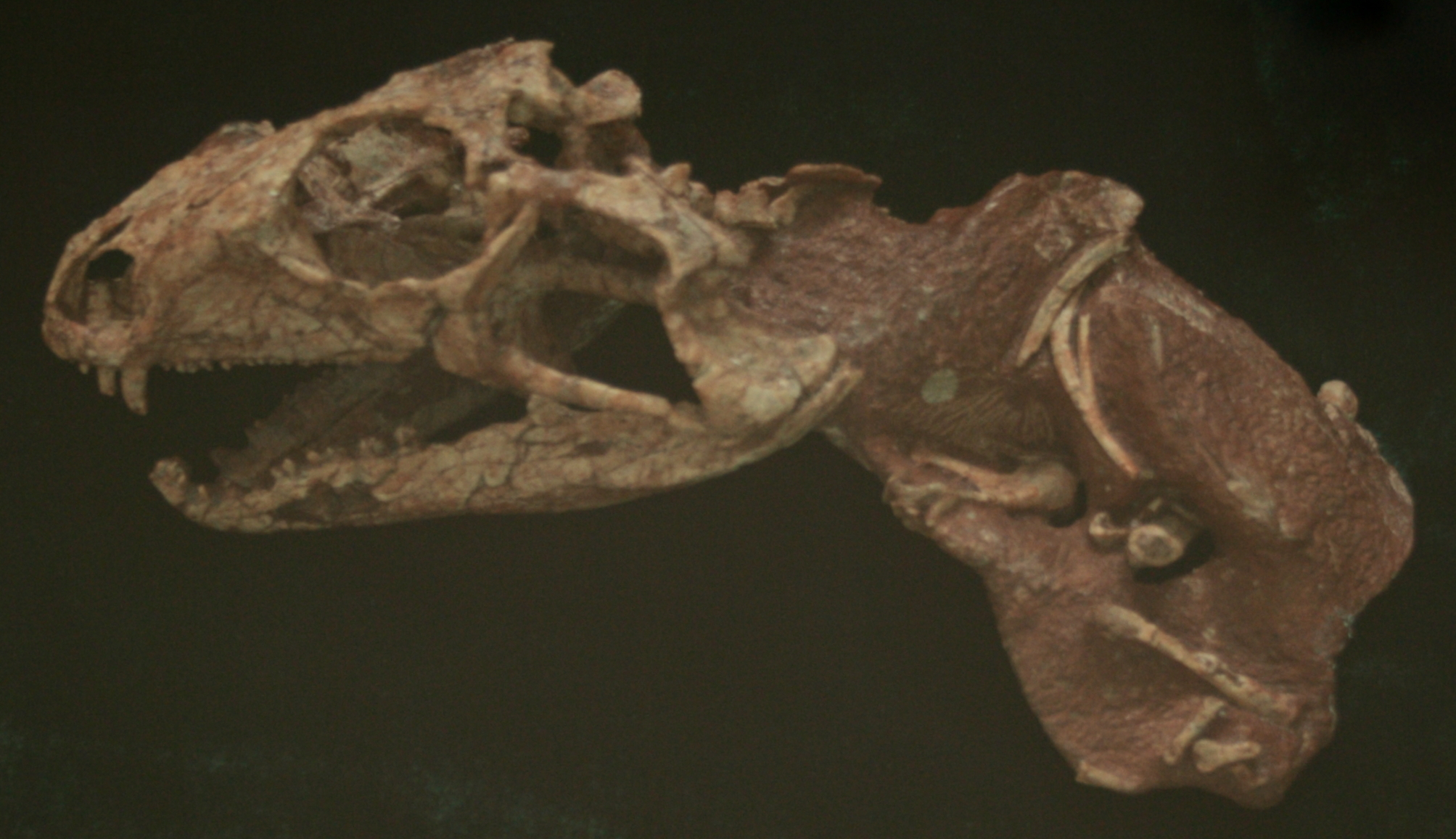
Tianyusaurus fossil

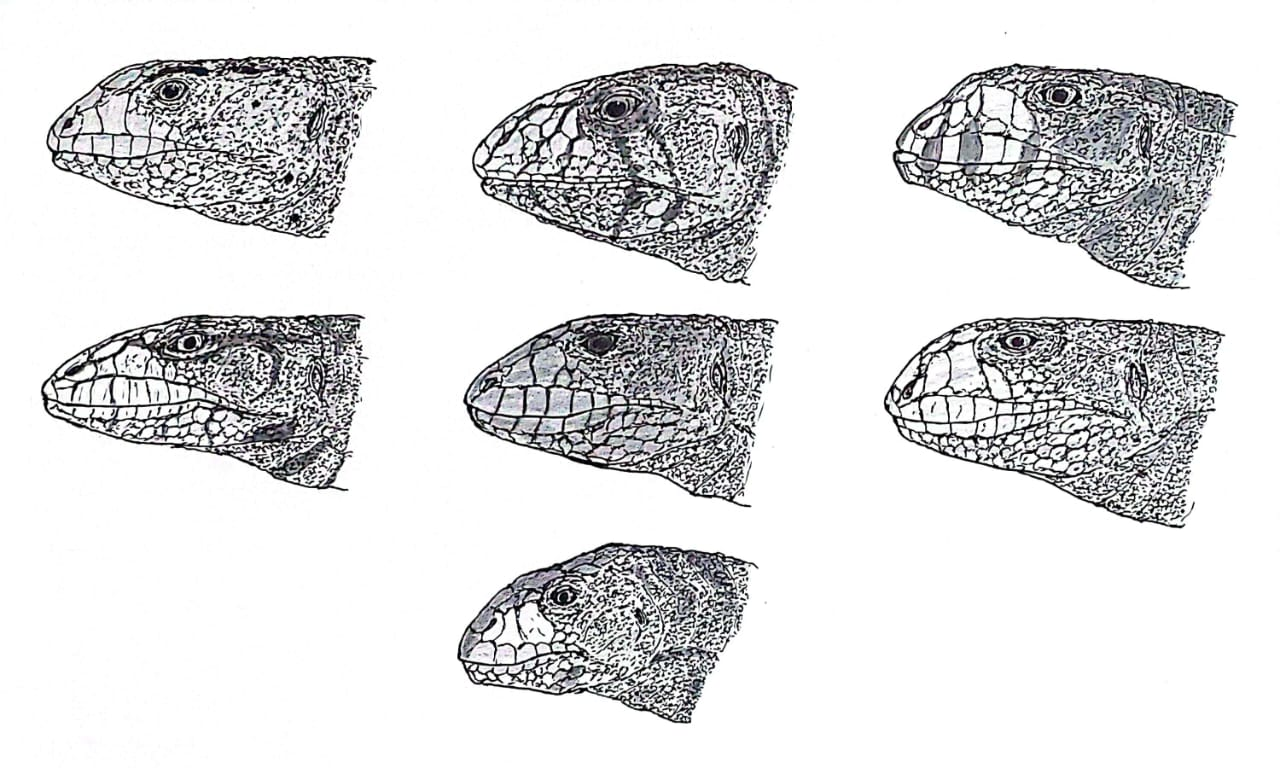
Reconstruction of various polyglyphanodontian heads: first row: Adamisaurus, Polyglyphanodon, Tuberocephalosaurus, second row: Tianyusaurus, Gilmoreteius, Darchansaurus., third row: Sineoamphisbaena

The classification of Polyglyphanodontia is contentious. They have been considered to be either most closely related to Teiioidea, or to Iguania, with both positions having been supported in recent studies. Cladogram after Xida, Niu and Evans, 2023.

- Squamata
  - Dibamidae
  - Gekkota
  - - Scincomorpha
    - - - - Teiioidea
          - †Polyglyphanodontia?
        - - Lacertidae
          - Amphisbaenia
      - - Anguimorpha
        - Serpentes
        - - Iguania
          - †Polyglyphanodontia?
