= List of the Cenozoic life of Virginia =

This list of the Cenozoic life of Virginia contains the various prehistoric life-forms whose fossilized remains have been reported from within the US state of Virginia and are between 66 million and 10,000 years of age.

== A ==
- †Abdounia
  - †Abdounia beaugei
  - †Abdounia minutissima
  - †Abdounia recticona
- Abies
- †Abra
  - †Abra aequalis
- Acanthocybium
  - †Acanthocybium proosti
- Accipiter
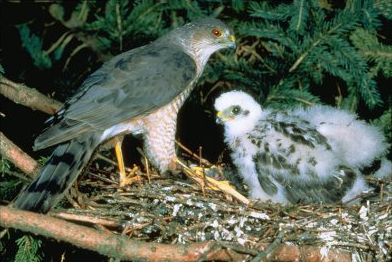
  - Living adult (center) and chick (lower right) Accipiter striatus, or sharp-shinned hawks
    †Accipiter striatus
- †Achilleodinium
  - †Achilleodinium bioformoides
- Acipenser
- Acmaea
- Acteocina
  - †Acteocina canaliculata
  - †Acteocina candei
- Acteon
  - †Acteon novellus
- †Actinocyclus
  - †Actinocyclus ellipticus
- †Actinoptychus
  - †Actinoptychus marylandicus
  - †Actinoptychus virginicus
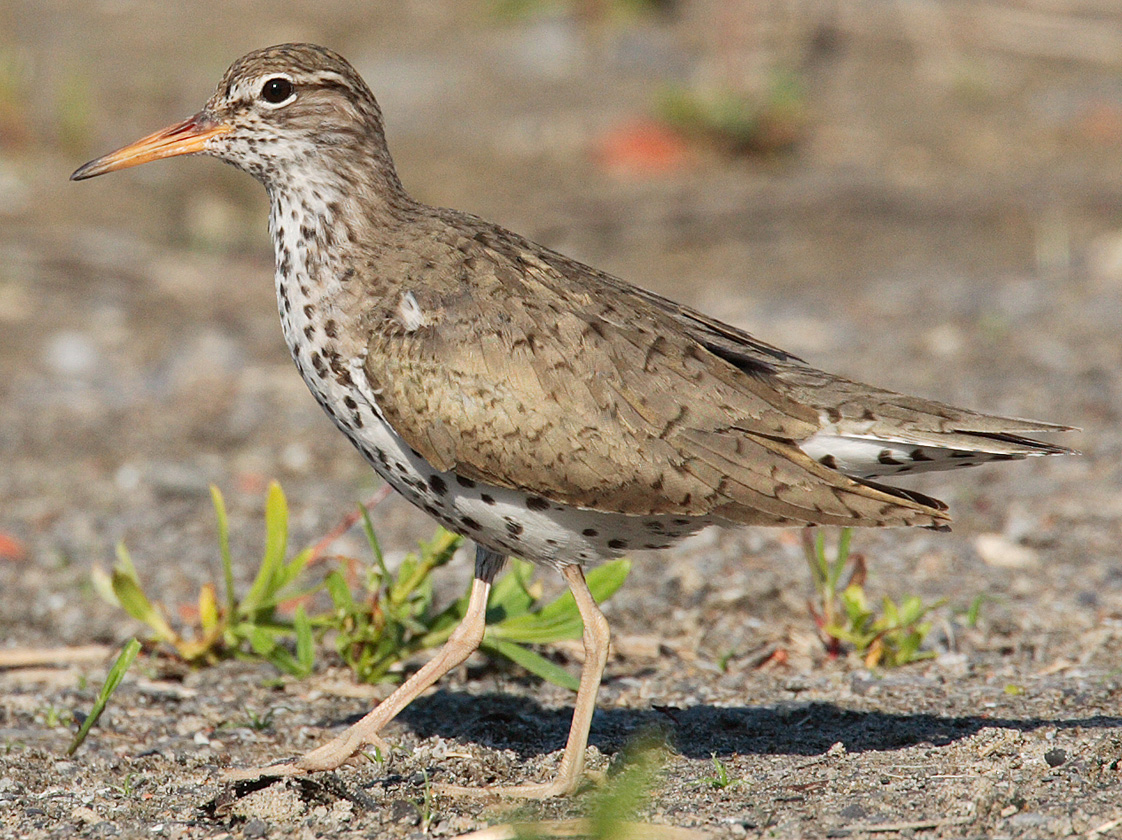
- A living Actitis macularius, or spotted sandpiper
  Actitis – or unidentified comparable form
  - †Actitis macularia
- †Adeorbis
- Aegolius
  - †Aegolius acadicus
- Aequipecten
  - †Aequipecten eboreus
- Aetobatus
  - †Aetobatus arcuatus
  - †Aetobatus irregularis
- Aetomylaeus
- Agelaius
  - †Agelaius phoeniceus
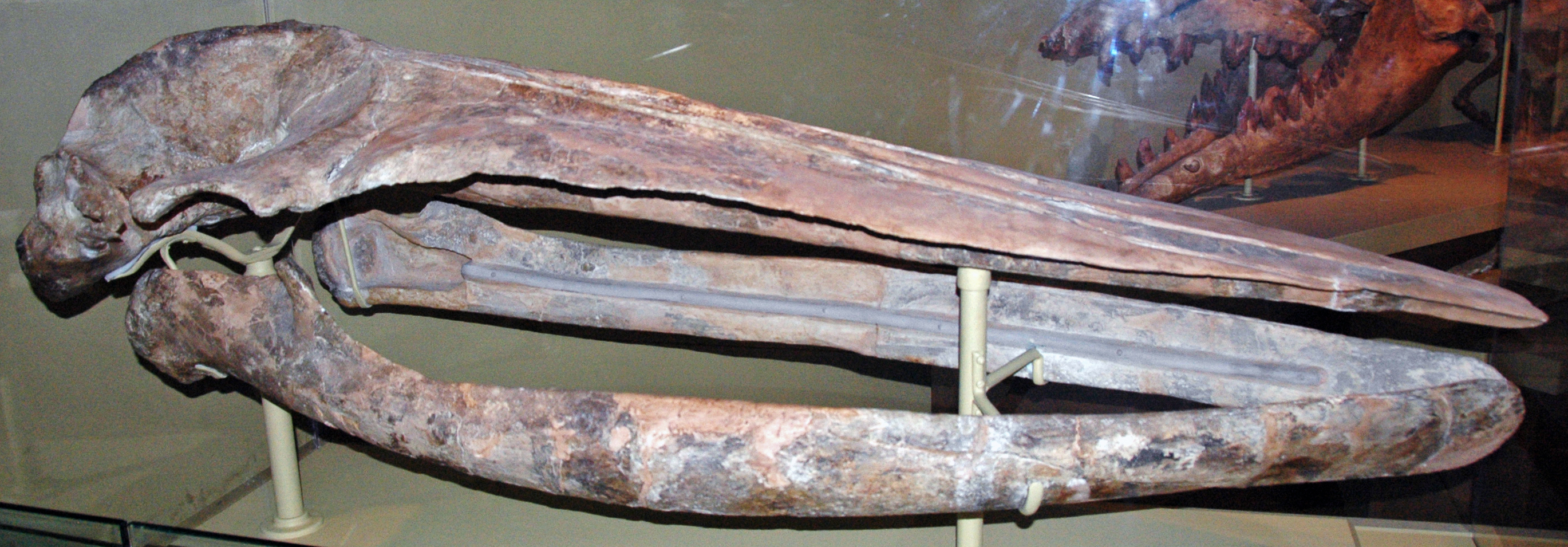
- Fossilized skull of the Miocene baleen whale Aglaocetus
  †Aglaocetus
  - †Aglaocetus patulus – type locality for species
- †Aglyptorhynchus
  - †Aglyptorhynchus venablesi
- Albula
  - †Albula eppsi
- Alca
  - †Alca torda – or unidentified comparable form
- Alces – or unidentified comparable form
  - †Alces alces
- Aligena
  - †Aligena aequata
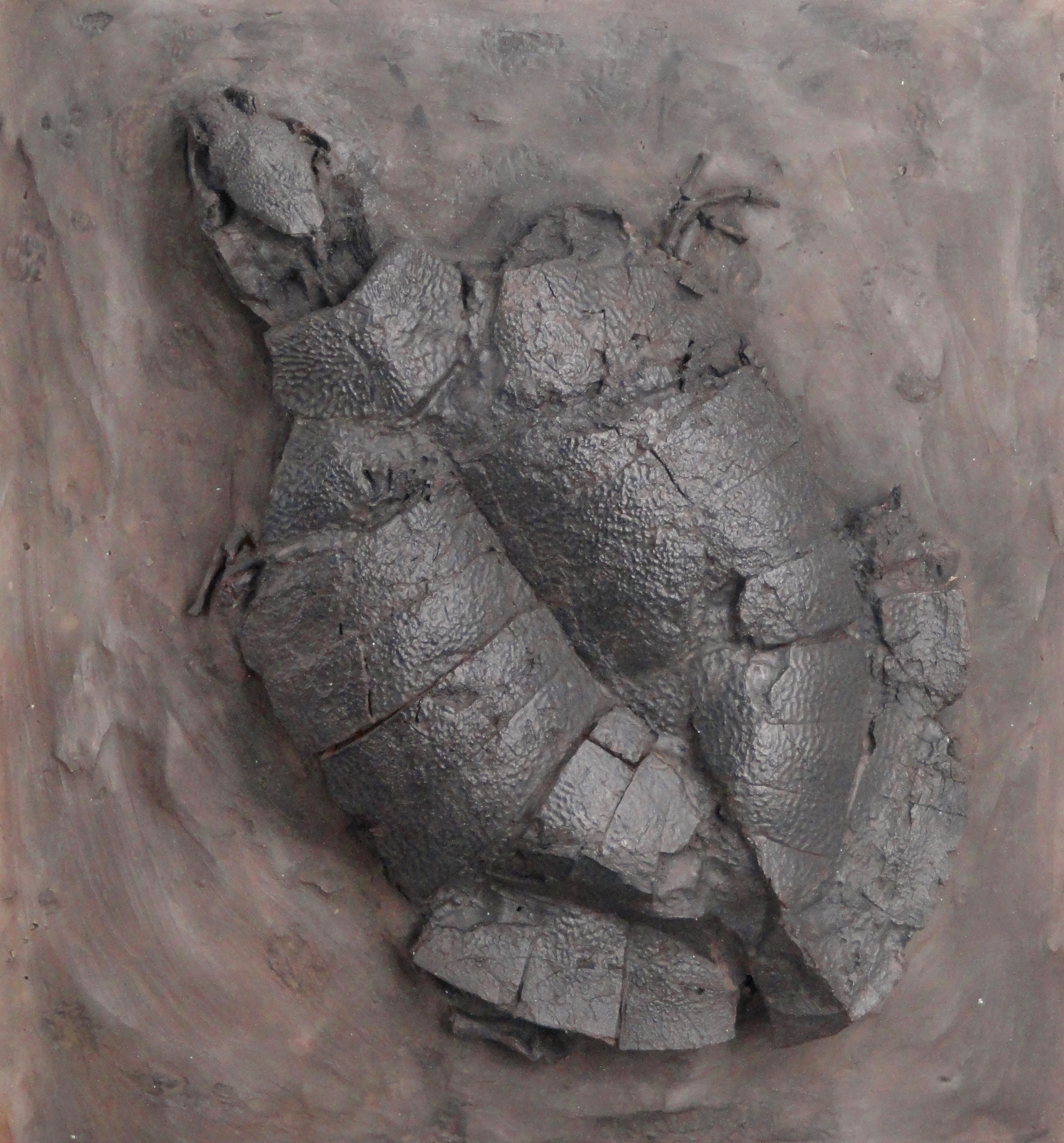
- Fossilized skeleton of the Eocene pig-nosed turtle Allaeochelys
  †Allaeochelys
- Alnus
- †Alopecias
  - †Alopecias grandis – type locality for species
- Alopias
- Aluterus
- †Ambystoma
- Amia
- Amiantis – tentative report
- Ammonia
  - †Ammonia limbatobeccarii
  - †Ammonia sobrina
  - †Ammonia tepida
- †Amonia
  - †Amonia limbatobeccarii
  - †Amonia limbatobeccarrii
  - †Amonia sobrina
  - †Amonia tepida
- †Ampelopsis
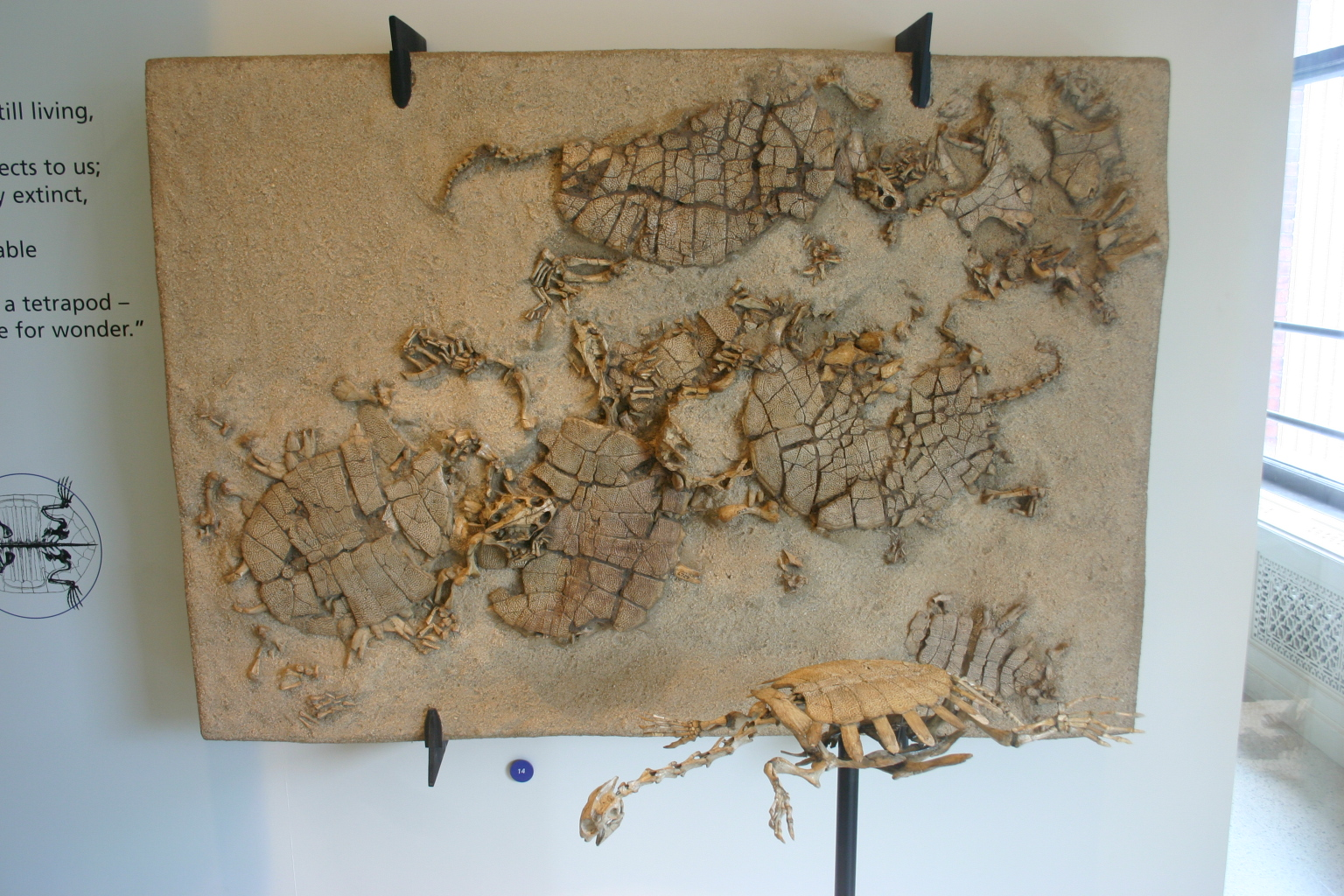
- Assemblage of fossilized skeletons of the softshell turtle Amyda
  Amyda – or unidentified comparable form
  - †Amyda pennata
- Anachis
  - †Anachis avara
  - †Anachis camax – or unidentified comparable form
  - †Anachis harrisii
- Anadara
  - †Anadara arata
  - †Anadara callicestosa
  - †Anadara lienosa
  - †Anadara ovalis
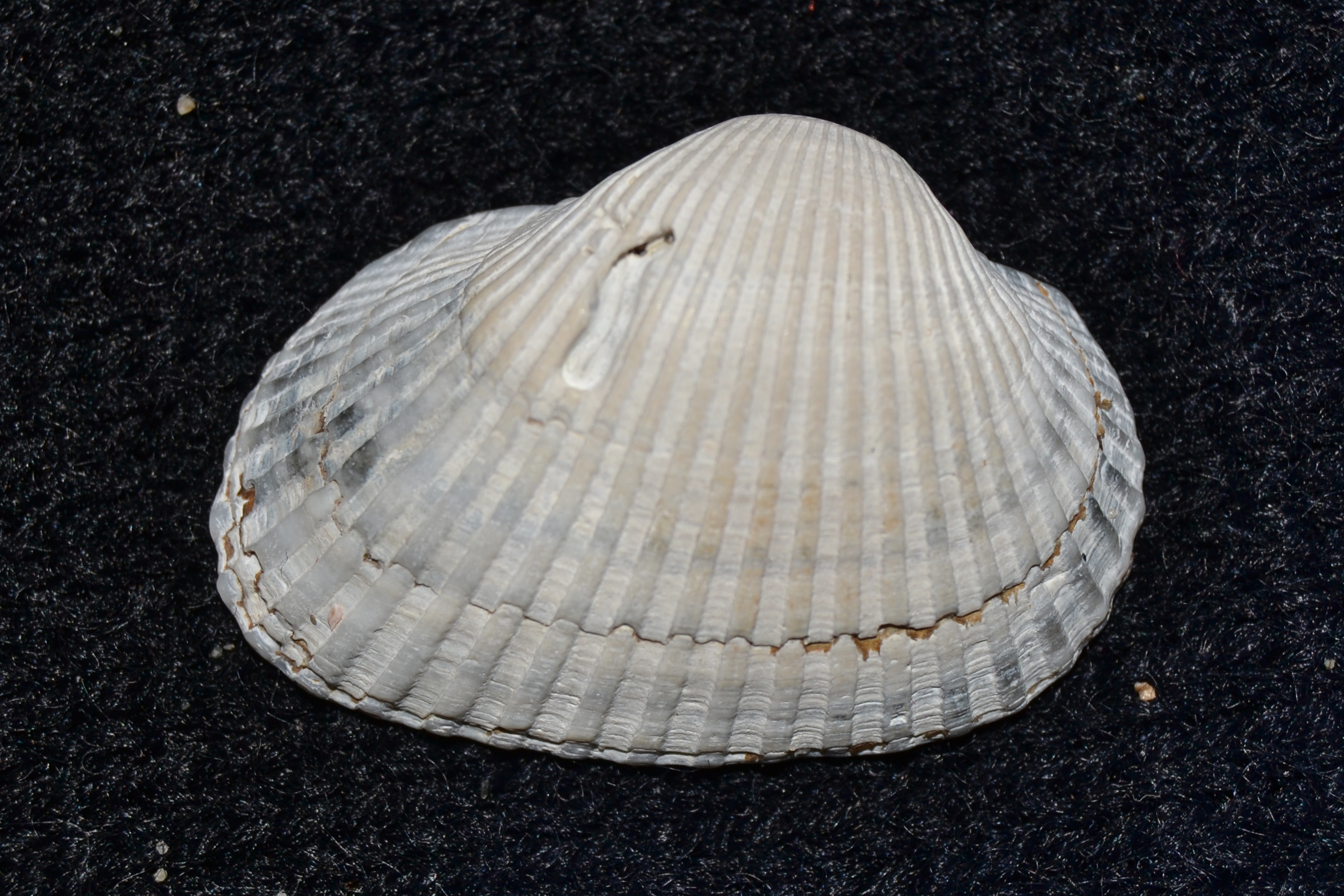
  - Shell of an Anadara transversa, or transverse ark clam
    †Anadara transversa
- †Anapteris
  - †Anapteris regalis
- Anas
  - †Anas crecca
  - †Anas discors
  - †Anas platyrhynchos – or unidentified comparable form
- Anguilla
  - †Anguilla bostoniensis – or unidentified comparable form
- †Anguispira
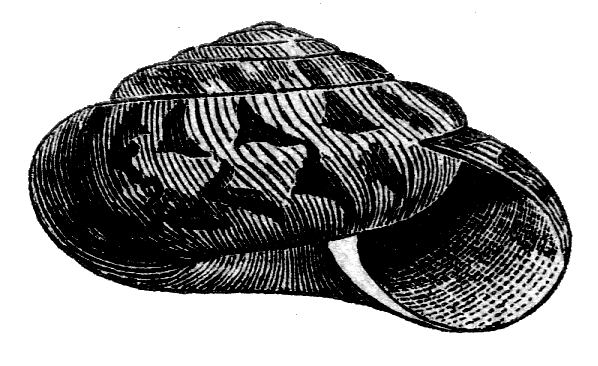
  - Illustration of the shell of a living Anguispira alternata land snail, or flamed tigersnail
    †Anguispira alternata
- Angulus
  - †Angulus agilis
  - †Angulus texanus
- Anisodonta – tentative report
- Anomia
  - †Anomia lisbonensis
  - †Anomia ruffini
  - †Anomia simplex
- †Anomotodon
  - †Anomotodon novus
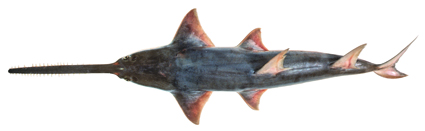
- A living Anoxypristis cuspidata, or knifetooth sawfish
  Anoxypristis
  - †Anoxypristis macrodens
- †Anthus – or unidentified comparable form
  - †Anthus spinoletta
- Aporrhais
  - †Aporrhais potomacensis
- †Araloselachus
  - †Araloselachus cuspidata
- Arbacia
  - †Arbacia improcera
- †Archaeohippus
- †Archaeomanta
  - †Archaeomanta melenhorsti
- Architectonica
  - †Architectonica ianthinae
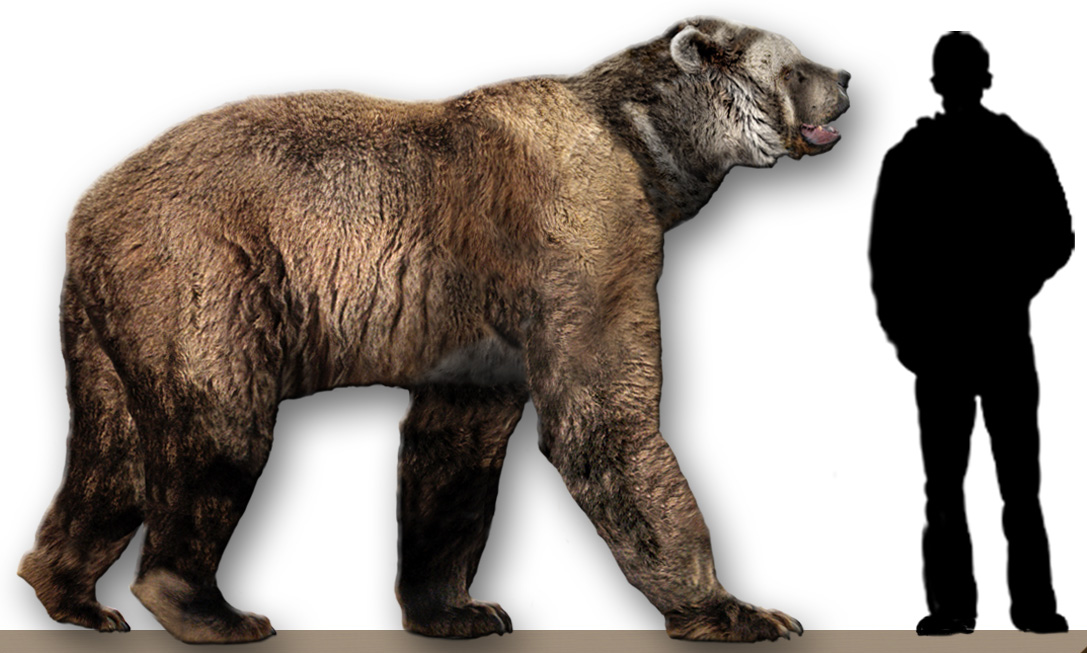
- Restoration of an Arctodus, or short-faced bear, with a human to scale
  †Arctodus
  - †Arctodus simus
- Argobuccinum
- Argopecten
  - †Argopecten gibbus
- Arius – tentative report
- Arossia
  - †Arossia glyptopoma
  - †Arossia newmani
- †Ashleychelys
  - †Ashleychelys palmeri
- Asio
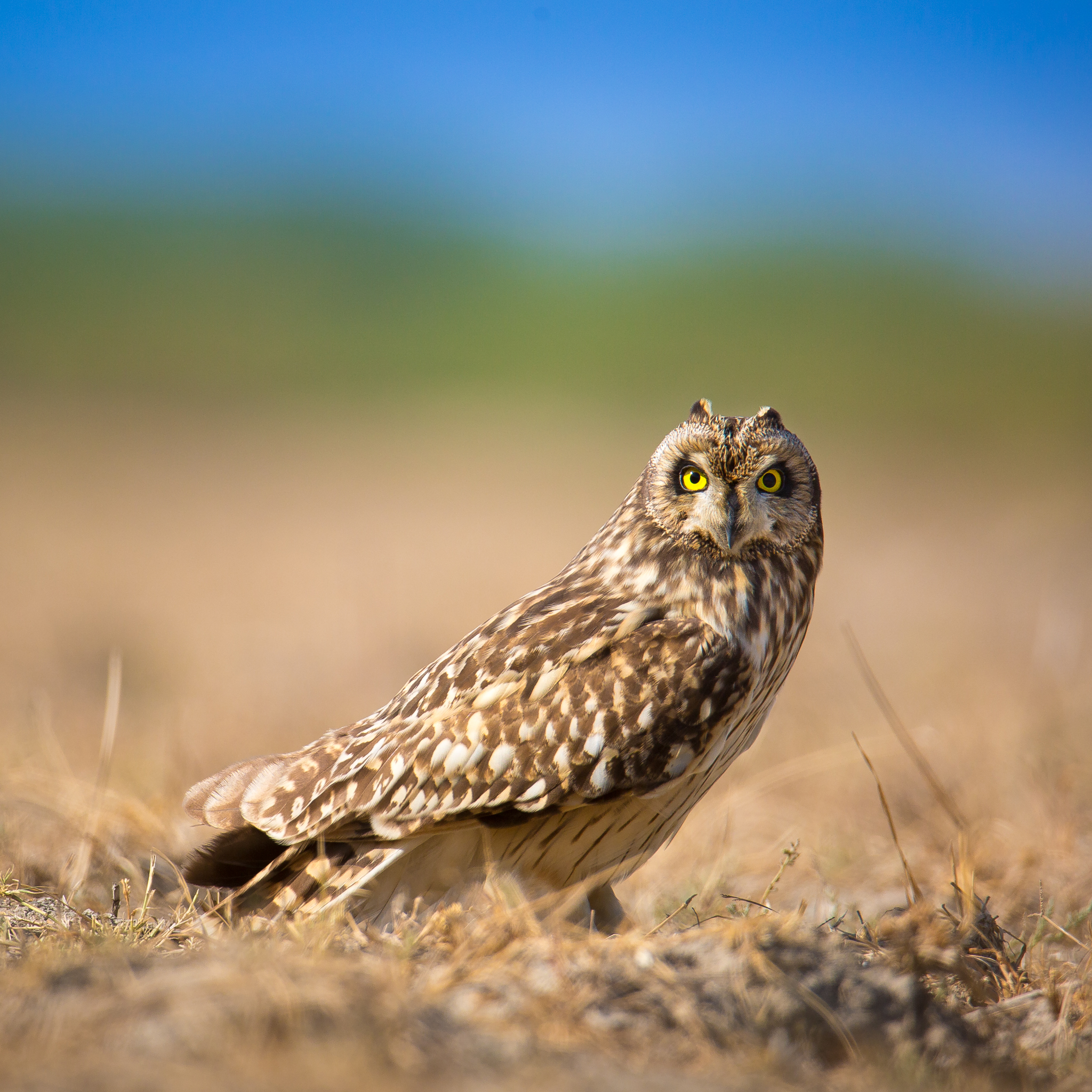
  - A living Asio flammeus, or Short-eared owl
    †Asio flammeus – or unidentified comparable form
- †Aspideretoides
  - †Aspideretoides virginianus – type locality for species
- Astarte
  - †Astarte castanea
  - †Astarte cobhamensis
  - †Astarte coheni
  - †Astarte concentrica
  - †Astarte deltoidea
  - †Astarte exaltata
  - †Astarte obruta
  - †Astarte perplana
  - †Astarte rappahannockensis
  - †Astarte undulata
  - †Astarte vaginulata
- Astrangia
  - †Astrangia danae
- †Astroscopus
- Astyris
  - †Astyris communis
  - †Astyris lunata
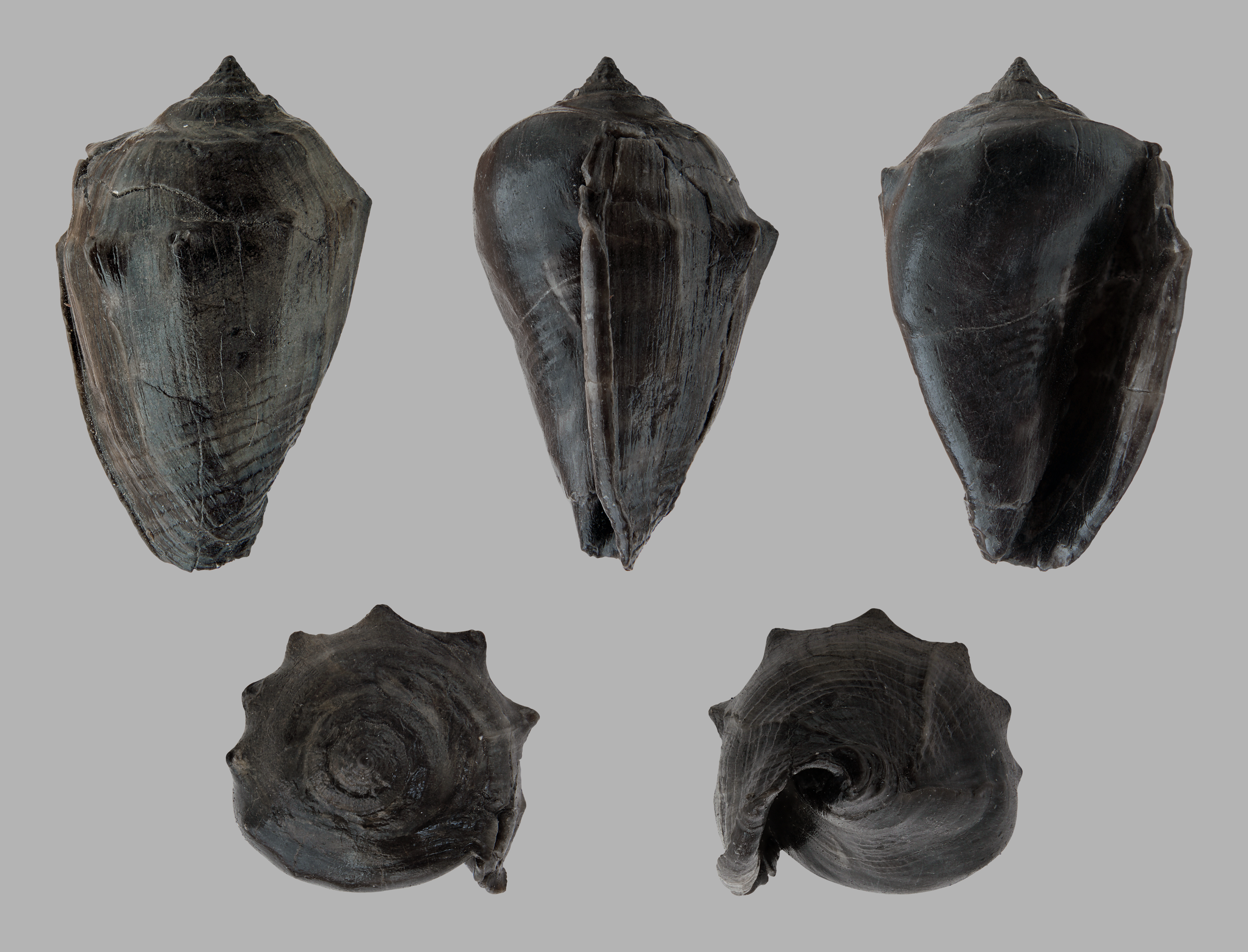
- Multiple views of a fossilized shell of the volute sea snail Athleta
  Athleta
  - †Athleta haleanus – or unidentified comparable form
  - †Athleta petrosa
  - †Athleta tuomeyi
- †Atractodon
  - †Atractodon stonei

== B ==
- Balaena
  - †Balaena ricei – type locality for species
- Balaenoptera
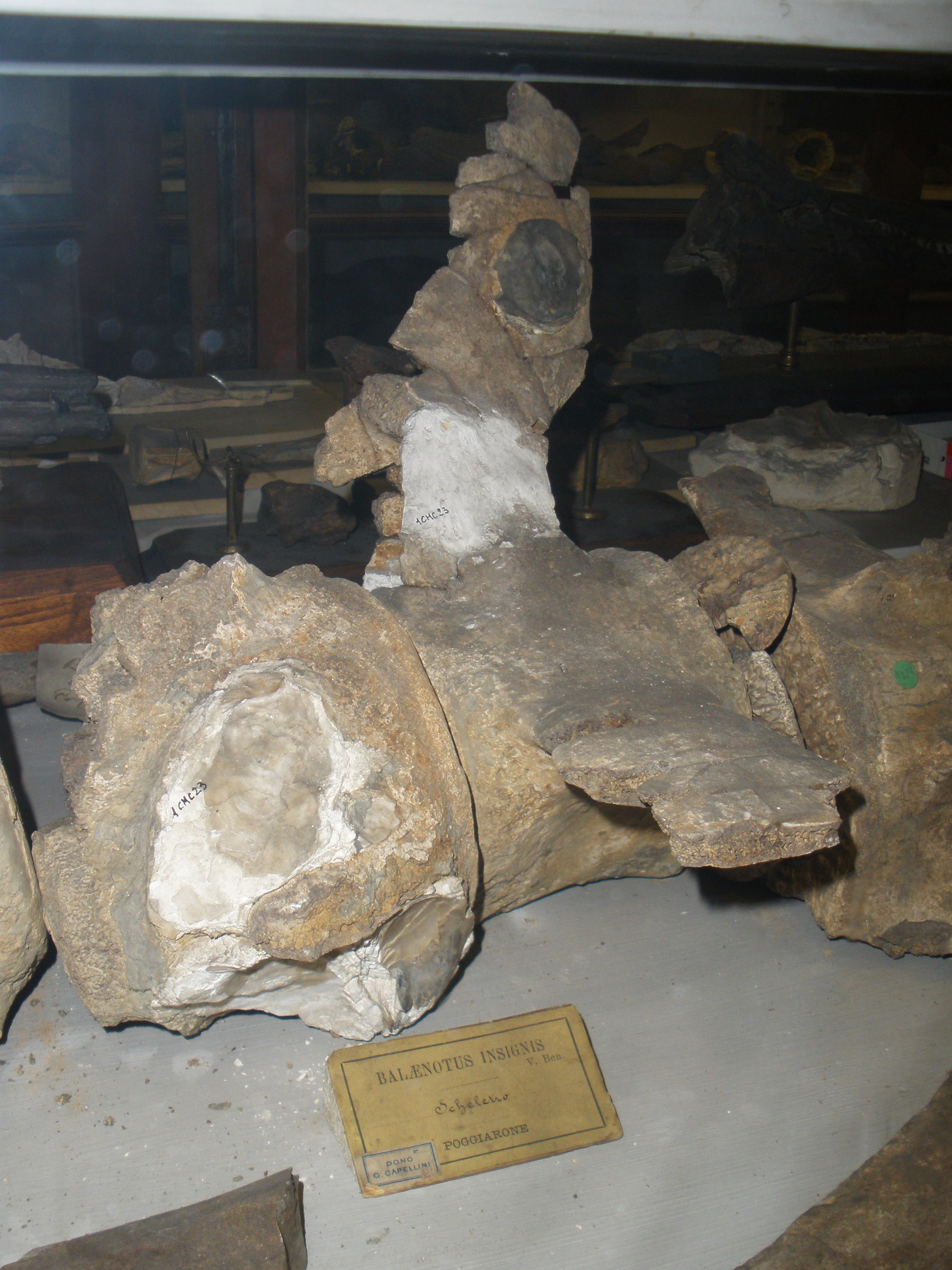
- Fossilized vertebrae of the Pliocene baleen whale Balaenotus
  †Balaenotus
- Balanophyllia
  - †Balanophyllia conradi – type locality for species
  - †Balanophyllia elaborata
- Balanus
  - †Balanus improvisus
- †Balbocerosoma
- Barbatia
  - †Barbatia carolinensis – tentative report
- Barnea
  - †Barnea costata
  - †Barnea truncata
- Bartramia
  - †Bartramia longicauda
- †Basilotritus
  - †Basilotritus wardii
- Bathytormus
  - †Bathytormus alaeformis
- †Beckettia – tentative report
- Betula
- Bicorbula
  - †Bicorbula idonea
- Bison
  - †Bison bison
- Bittiolum
  - †Bittiolum alternatum
- Blarina
  - †Blarina brevicauda
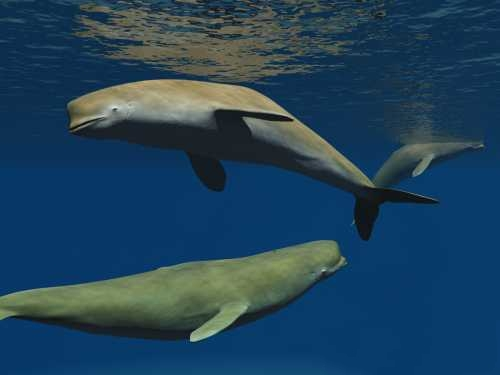
- Life restoration of the Pliocene toothed whale Bohaskaia
  †Bohaskaia – type locality for genus
  - †Bohaskaia monodontoides – type locality for species
- †Bolcyrus – or unidentified comparable form
  - †Bolcyrus formosissimus
- Bolivina
- Bombycilla
  - †Bombycilla cedrorum
- Bonasa
  - †Bonasa umbellus
  - †Bonasa umbrellus
- †Bootherium
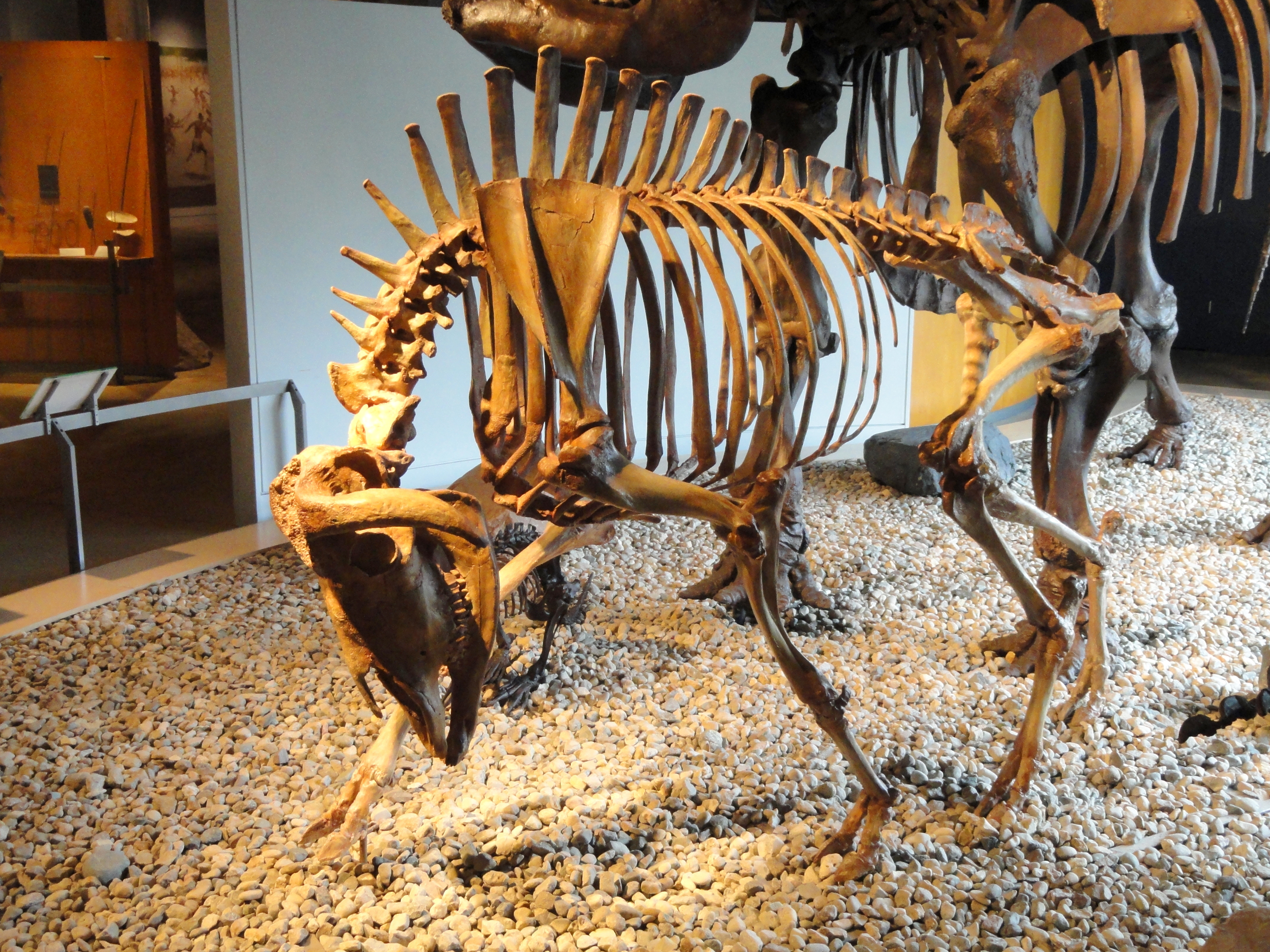
  - Fossilized skeleton of the Pleistocene-Holocene bovid Bootherium bombifrons, or Harlan's musk ox.
    †Bootherium bombifrons
- Boreotrophon
  - †Boreotrophon tetricus
- Bornia
  - †Bornia longipes
  - †Bornia triangulata
- Bos
  - †Bos taurus
- Bostrycapulus
  - †Bostrycapulus aculeatus
- Botaurus
  - †Botaurus lentiginosus
- Brachidontes
  - †Brachidontes potomacensis
- Brachiodontes
- Branta
  - †Branta bernicla
- †Brevirostrodelphis
  - †Brevirostrodelphis dividum
- †Brevoortia
- †Brychaetus
  - †Brychaetus muelleri
- Bubo
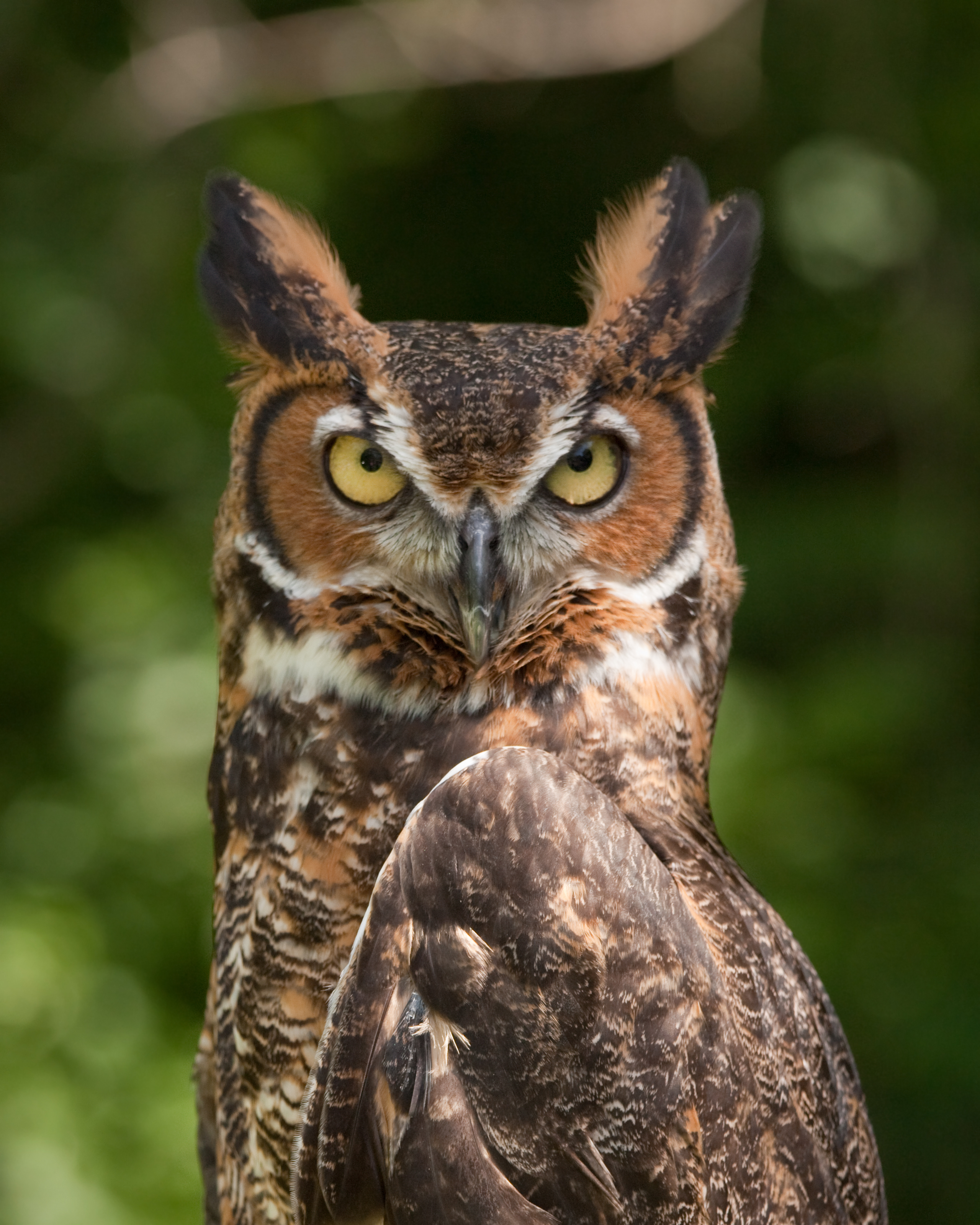
  - A living Bubo virginianus, or great horned owl
    †Bubo virginianus
- Buccella
  - †Buccella depressa
- †Buccinifusus
  - †Buccinifusus parilis
- Buccinofusus
  - †Buccinofusus parilis
- Buccinum
  - †Buccinum undatum
- Bucephala
  - †Bucephala albeola
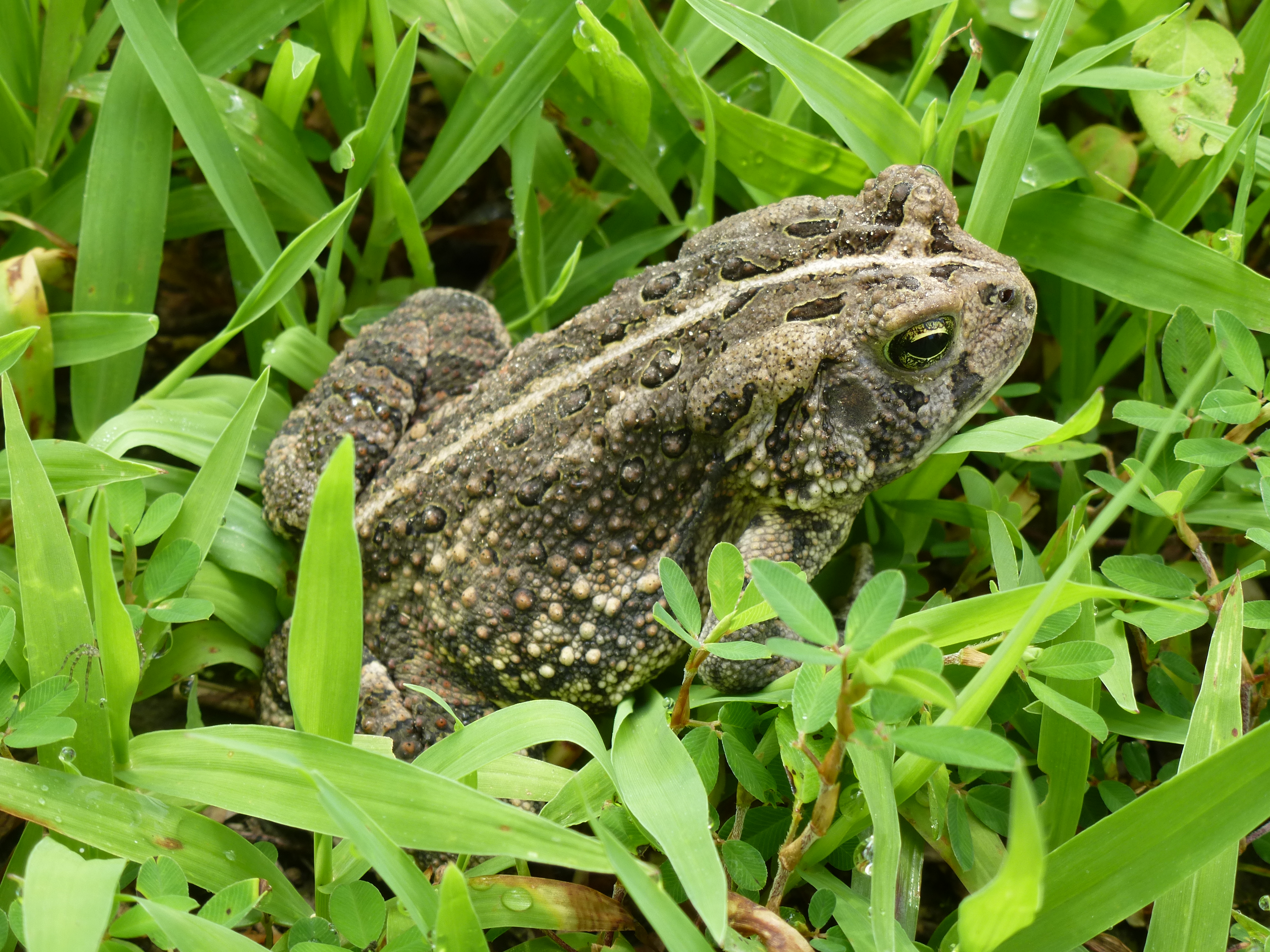
- A living Anaxyrus fowleri (formerly Bufo fowleri), or Fowler's toad
  Bufo
  - †Bufo woodhousei
- Buliminella
  - †Buliminella elegantissima – or unidentified comparable form
- †Bulliopsis
  - †Bulliopsis quadrata
- †Burnhamia
  - †Burnhamia daviesi
- Busycon
  - †Busycon carica
  - †Busycon caricum
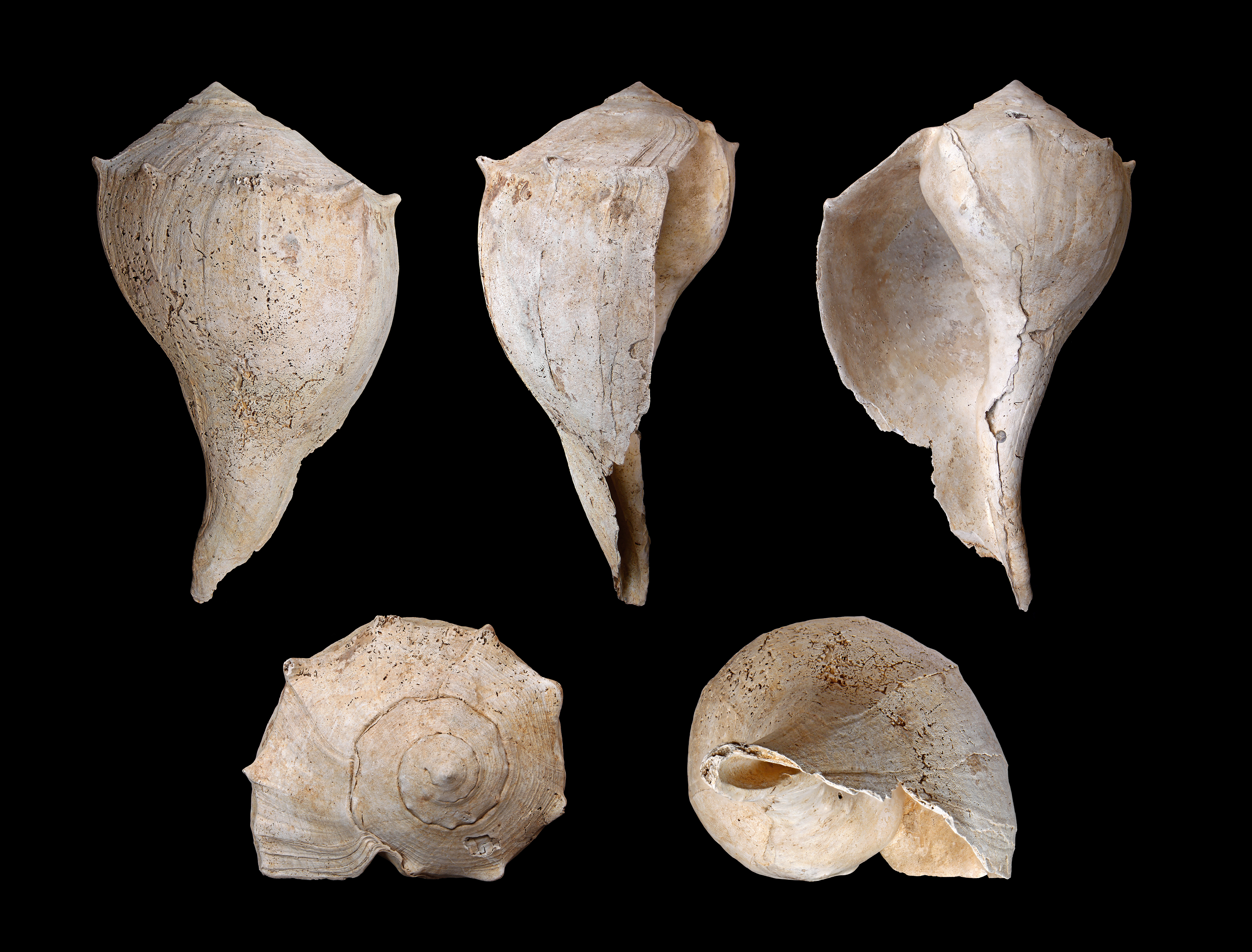
  - Shell in multiple views of a Busycon contrarium whelk
    †Busycon contrarium
  - †Busycon coronatum
  - †Busycon incile
  - †Busycon maximum
  - †Busycon maximus
- Busycotypus
  - †Busycotypus canaliculatus
  - †Busycotypus coronatum
  - †Busycotypus incile
  - †Busycotypus rugosum
- Buteo
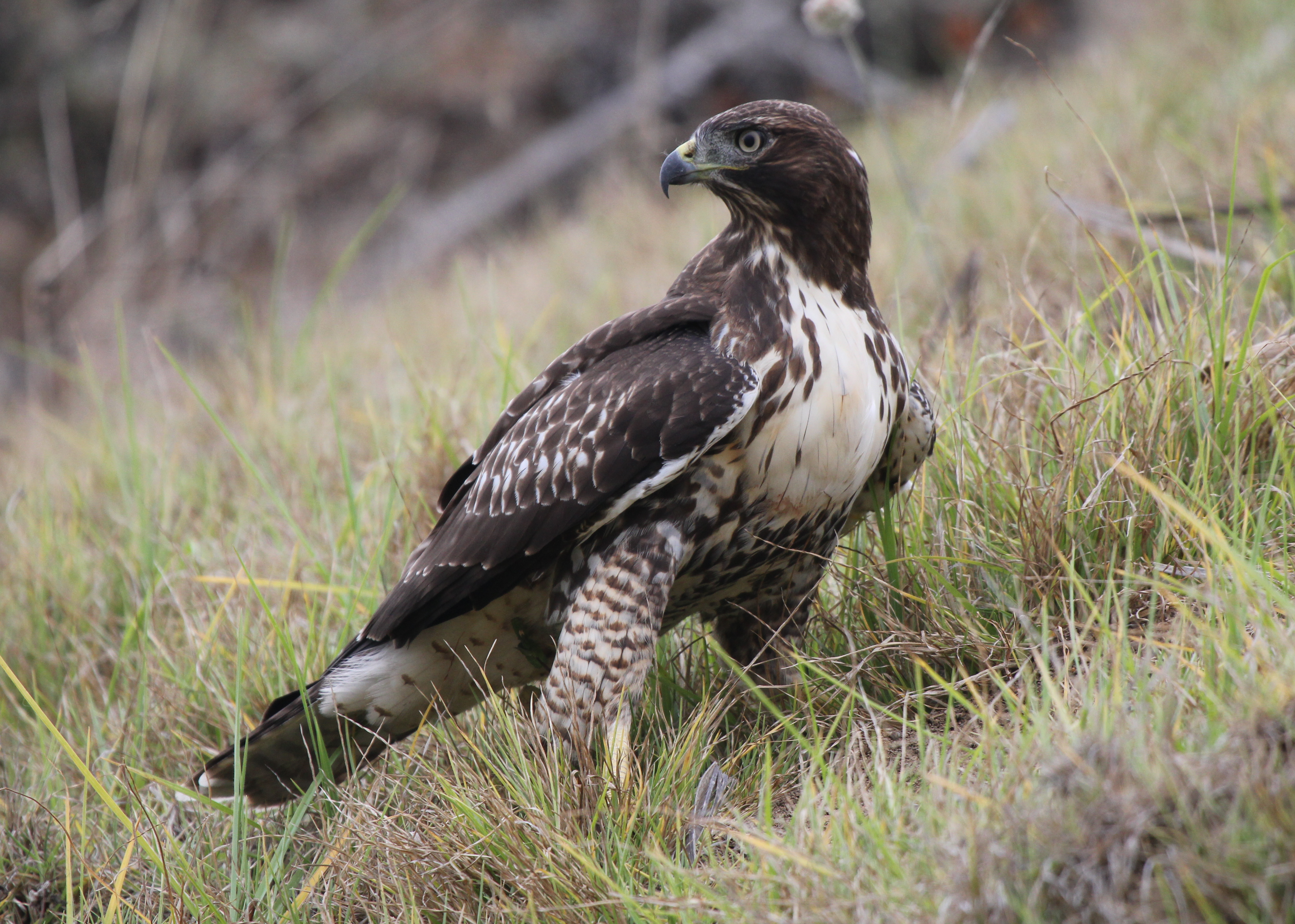
  - A living Buteo jamaicensis, or red-tailed hawk
    †Buteo jamaicensis
  - †Buteo lineatus
  - †Buteo platypterus

== C ==
- †Cacharias
- Cadulus
  - †Cadulus thallus
- Caecum
  - †Caecum cooperi
- Caestocorbula
  - †Caestocorbula fossata
- †Calasoma
- †Calippus
  - †Calippus regulus – or unidentified comparable form
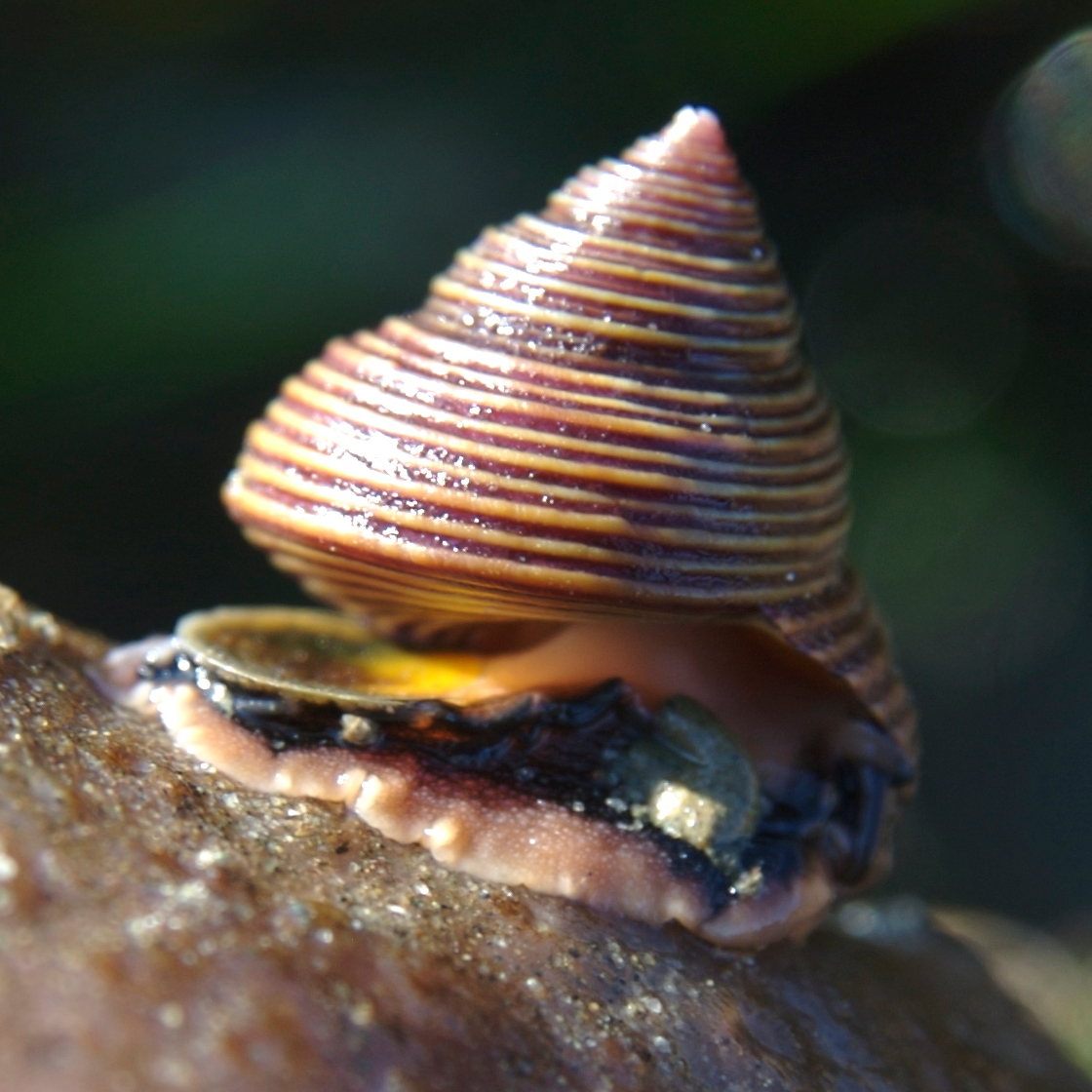
- A living Calliostoma top sea snail
  Calliostoma
  - †Calliostoma bellum
  - †Calliostoma philanthropus
  - †Calliostoma philothropus
  - †Calliostoma virginicum
- †Callippus
  - †Callippus regulus – or unidentified comparable form
- Callista
  - †Callista perovata
- Callocardia
  - †Callocardia catharia
- Calonectris
  - †Calonectris kurodai – type locality for species
- †Calophos
  - †Calophos plicatile
- †Calorhadia
  - †Calorhadia bella
  - †Calorhadia opulenta
  - †Calorhadia semen
- †Calyptraphorus
  - †Calyptraphorus trinodiferus
  - †Calyptraphorus velatus
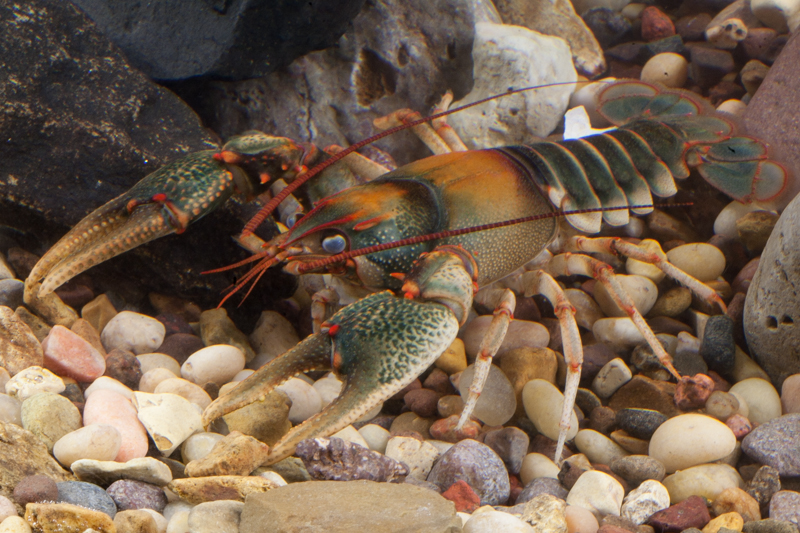
- Cambarus
  Cambarus
  - †Cambarus bartonii – or unidentified comparable form
  - †Cambarus longulus – or unidentified comparable form
- †Campanuyla
- Canachites
  - †Canachites canadensis
- †Canarium
  - †Canarium parksii
- Cancellaria
- Cancer
  - †Cancer irroratus
- Canis
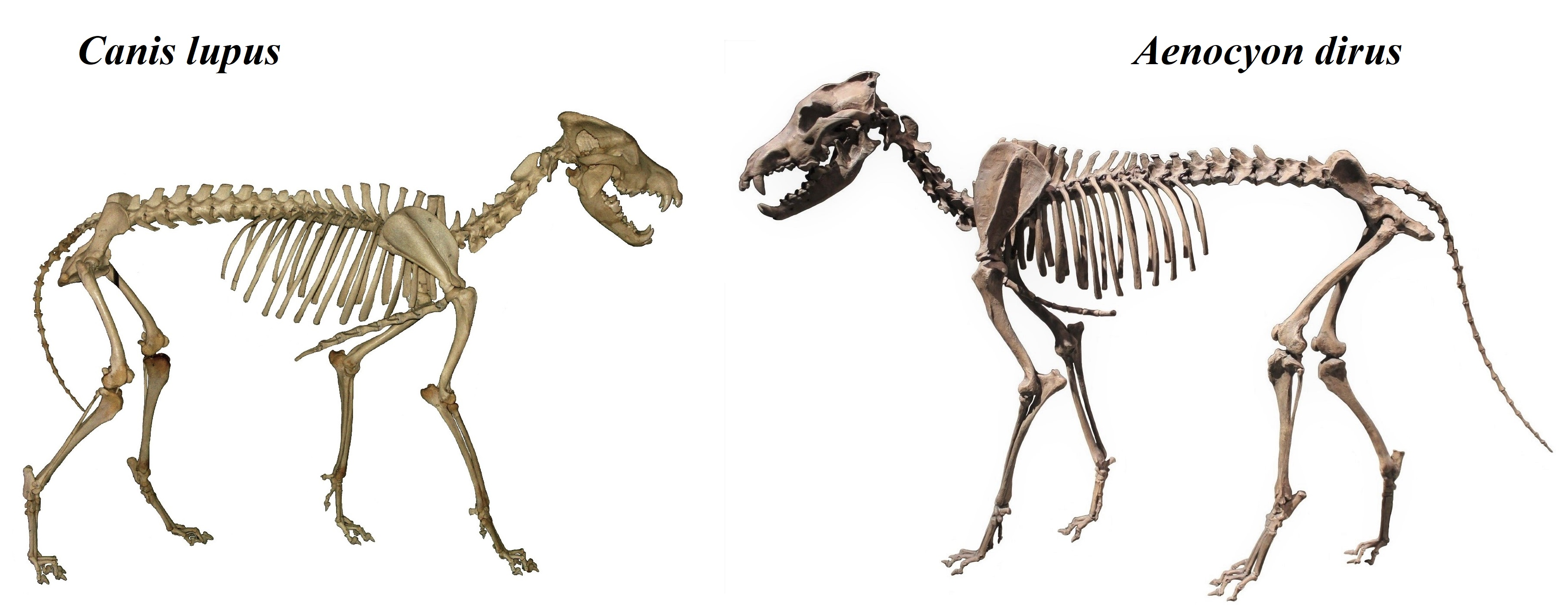
  - Modern mounted skeleton of Canis lupus, the grey wolf, to scale with a fossilized skeleton of the Pleistocene wolf Canis dirus, or dire wolf
    †Canis dirus
  - †Canis latrans
  - †Canis lupus – or unidentified comparable form
- Cantharus
  - †Cantharus marylandicus
- Canthon
- Capella
  - †Capella gallinago
- Carcharhinus
- Carcharias
  - †Carcharias hopei
  - †Carcharias teretidens
- Carcharodon
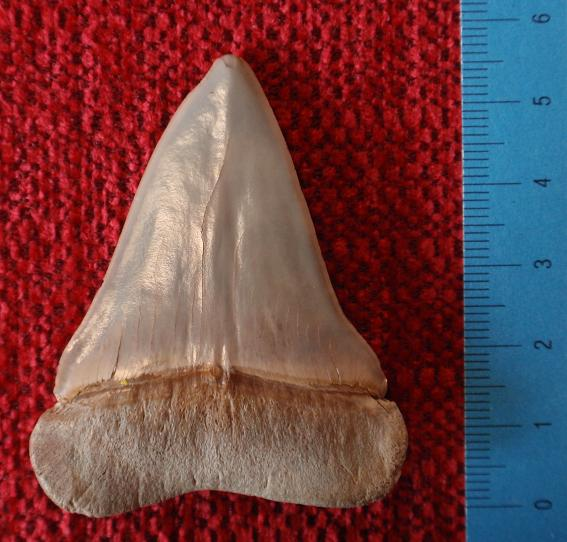
  - Fossilized tooth of the Miocene-Pliocene shark Cosmopolitodus hastalis, or broad-toothed mako
    †Carcharodon hastalis
- Carditamera
  - †Carditamera arata
- †Caricella
- †Carinorbis
  - †Carinorbis dalli
- †Carolinapecten
  - †Carolinapecten eboreus
  - †Carolinapecten urbannaensis
- †Carolinochelys
  - †Carolinochelys wilsoni
- Carphophis
  - †Carphophis amoenus
- Carya
- Caryocorbula
  - †Caryocorbula caribaea
  - †Caryocorbula conradi
  - †Caryocorbula contracta
  - †Caryocorbula deusseni
- Castor
  - †Castor canadensis
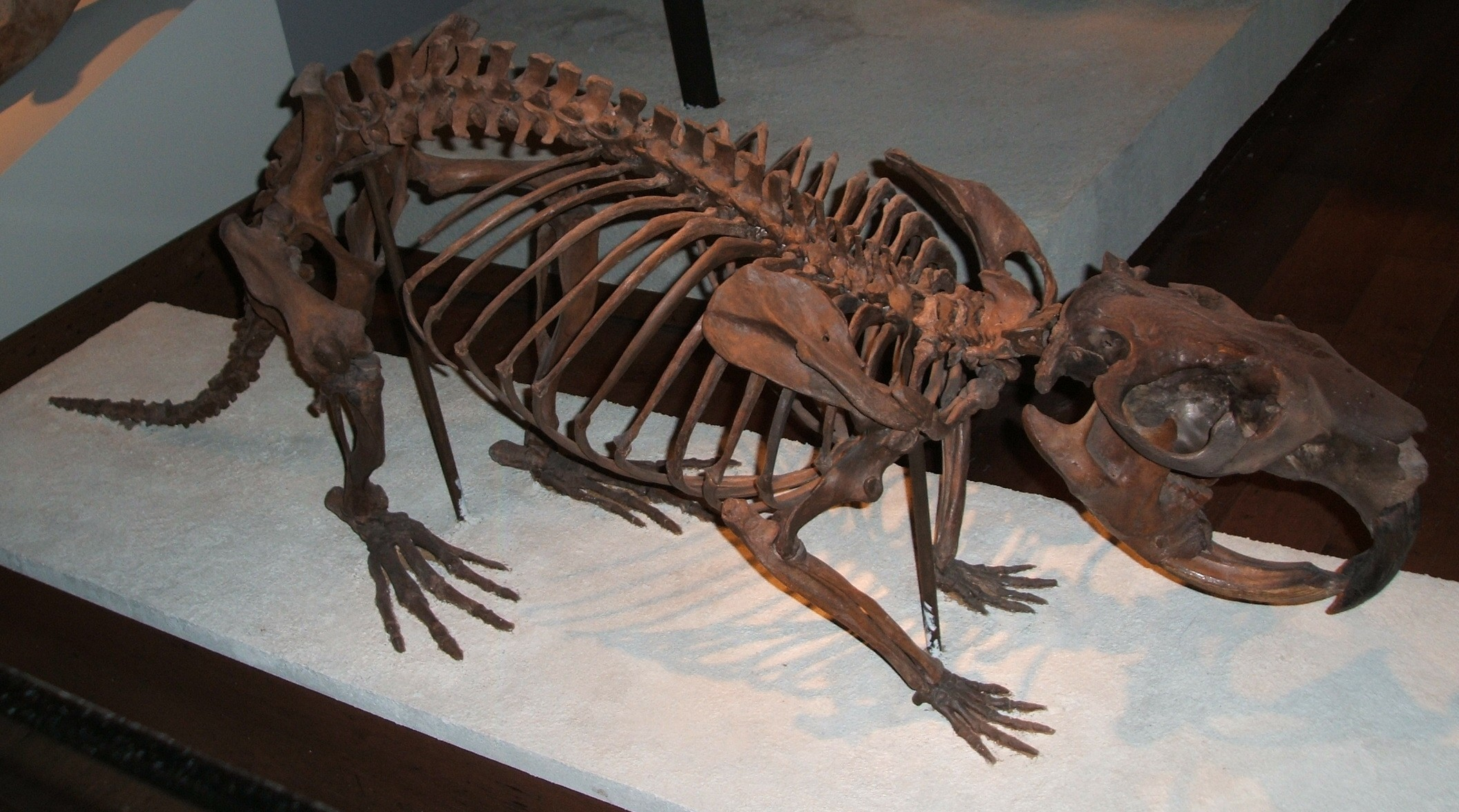
- Mounted fossilized skeleton of the Pliocene-Pleistocene giant beaver Castoroides
  †Castoroides
  - †Castoroides ohioensis
- Catharus
- †Catinella
- Catoptrophorus
  - †Catoptrophorus semipalmatus
- †Catostomus
- Celtis
  - †Celtis occidentalis
- Cerithiopsis
  - †Cerithiopsis greenii
- Certhia
  - †Certhia familiaris
- †Cervalces – tentative report
  - †Cervalces scotti
- Cervus
  - †Cervus elaphus
- Cetorhinus
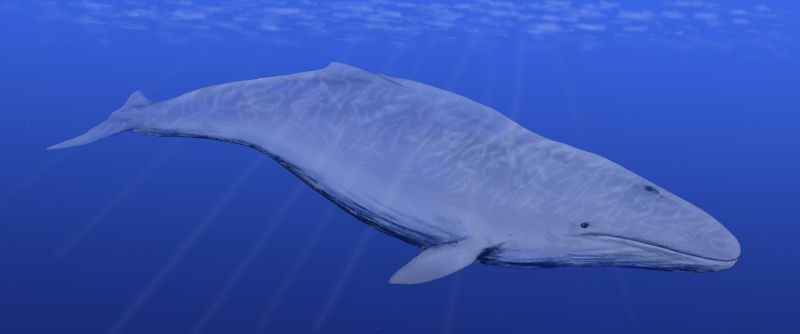
- Life restoration of the Miocene-Pliocene whale Cetotherium
  †Cetotherium
  - †Cetotherium crassangulum – type locality for species
- Chaetura
  - †Chaetura pelagica
- Chama
  - †Chama congregata
- †Charadrisu
  - †Charadrisu vociferus
- Charadrius
  - †Charadrius vociferus
- Chelydra
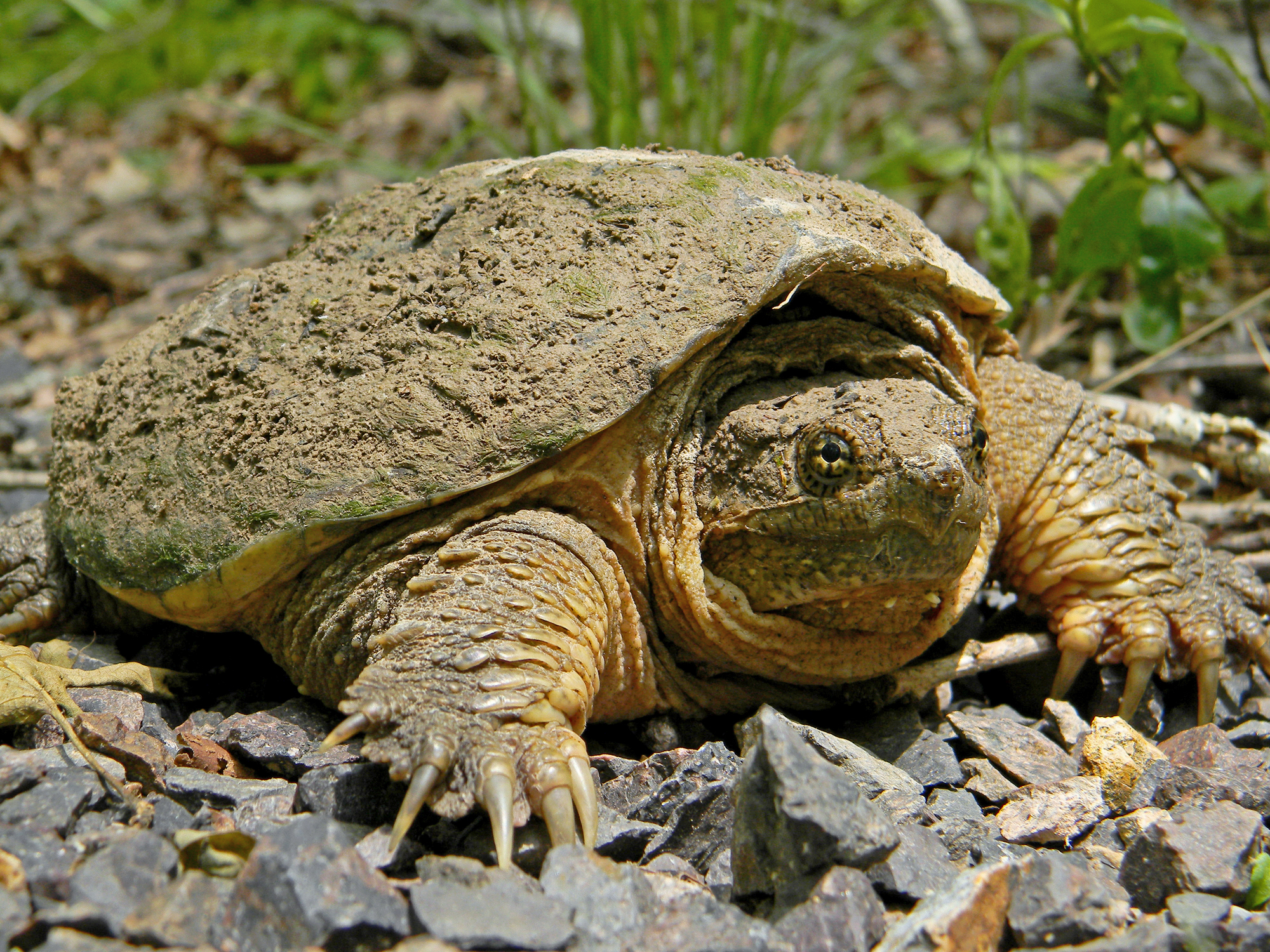
  - A living Chelydra serpentina, or common snapping turtle
    †Chelydra serpentina
- †Chesacardium
  - †Chesacardium acutilaqueatum
  - †Chesacardium laqueatum
- †Chesaconcavus
  - †Chesaconcavus myosulcatus
  - †Chesaconcavus proteus
  - †Chesaconcavus rossi
  - †Chesaconcavus santamaria
- †Chesapactern
  - †Chesapactern madisonius
- †Chesapecten
  - †Chesapecten clintonius
  - †Chesapecten coccymelus
  - †Chesapecten edgecombensis
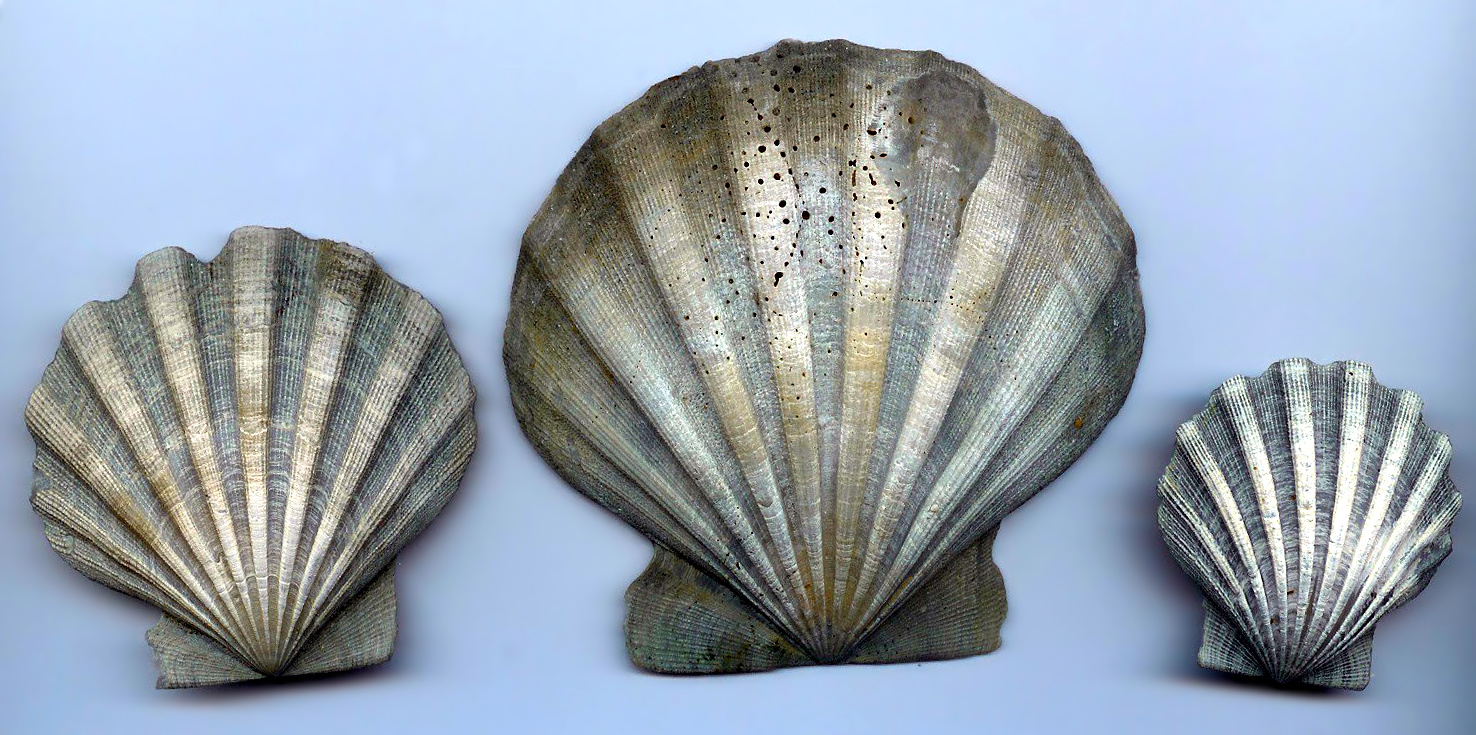
  - Shells of the Pliocene scallop Chesapecten jeffersonius
    †Chesapecten jeffersonius
  - †Chesapecten madisonianis
  - †Chesapecten madisonius
  - †Chesapecten middlesexensis
  - †Chesapecten nefrens
  - †Chesapecten santamaria
- Chione
  - †Chione cancellata
  - †Chione cribraria
- Chlamys
  - †Chlamys brookvillensis
  - †Chlamys choctavensis
  - †Chlamys decemaria
  - †Chlamys johnsoni
  - †Chlamys santamaria
  - †Chlamys seabeensis
  - †Chlamys vaunwythei – or unidentified comparable form
  - †Chlamys wahtubbeana
- †Chordeiles
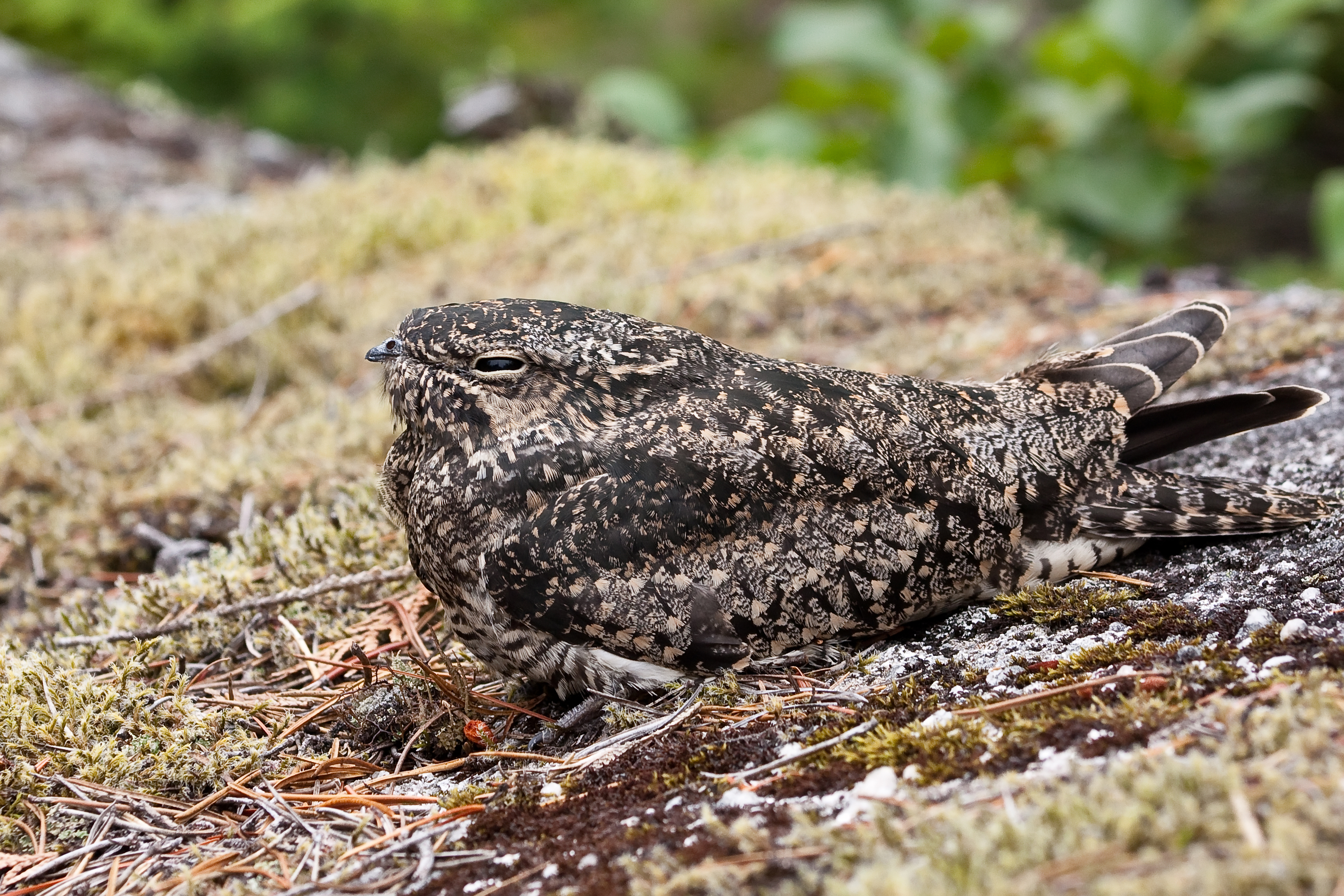
  - A living Chordeiles minor, or common nighthawk
    †Chordeiles minor
- Cibicides
  - †Cibicides lobatulus
- Cingula
  - †Cingula norfolkensis
- Circulus
  - †Circulus liratus
- Cirsotrema
- Cistothorus
  - †Cistothorus platensis – or unidentified comparable form
- Clavus – report made of unidentified related form or using admittedly obsolete nomenclature
  - †Clavus eburnea
- †Cleistosphaeridium
  - †Cleistosphaeridium placacanthum
- Clethrionomys
  - †Clethrionomys gapperi
- Clidiophora
  - †Clidiophora crassidens
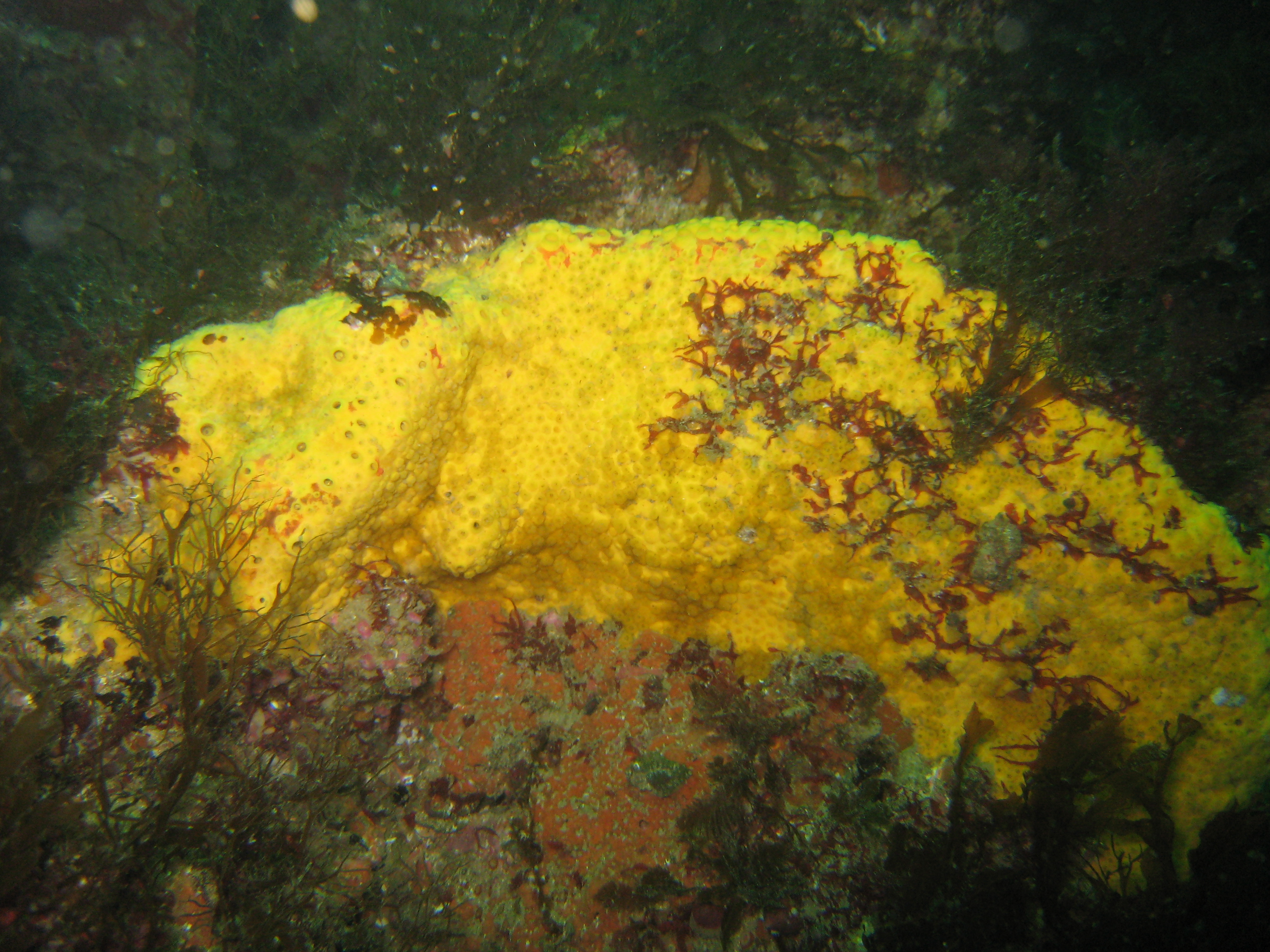
- A living Cliona sponge
  Cliona
- Coccyzus
- †Cochliolepsis
- Colaptes
  - †Colaptes auratus
- Colinus
  - †Colinus virginianus
- Coluber
  - †Coluber constrictor
- †Columella
  - †Columella simplex
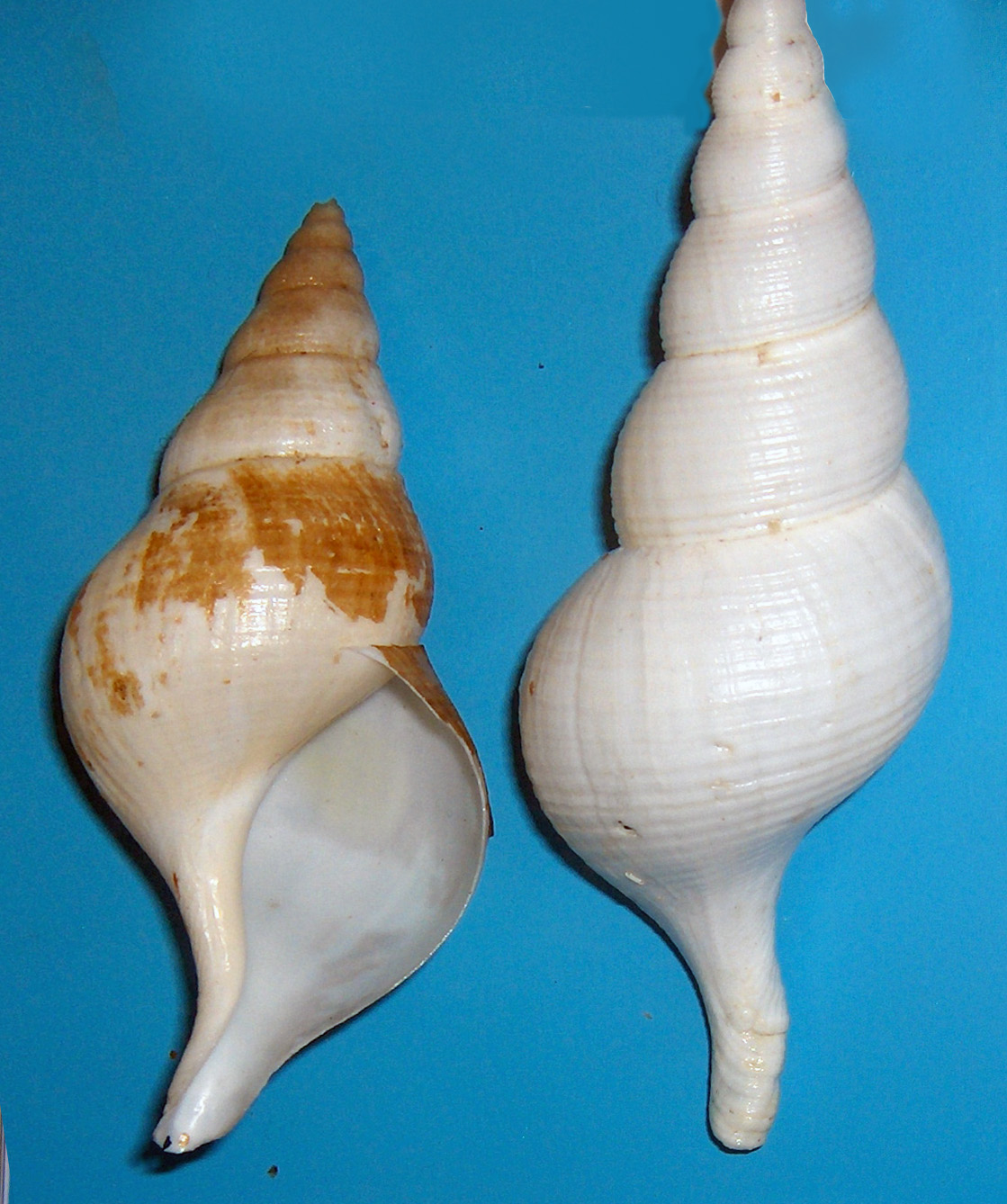
- Shells in differing orientations of Colus whelk sea snails
  Colus
  - †Colus pygmaeus
- Condylura
  - †Condylura cristata
  - †Condylura crystata
- †Conradostrea
  - †Conradostrea sculpturata
- Contopus
  - †Contopus virens
- †Contropus
  - †Contropus virens
- Conus
  - †Conus adversarius
  - †Conus deluvianus
  - †Conus diluvianus
  - †Conus marylandicus
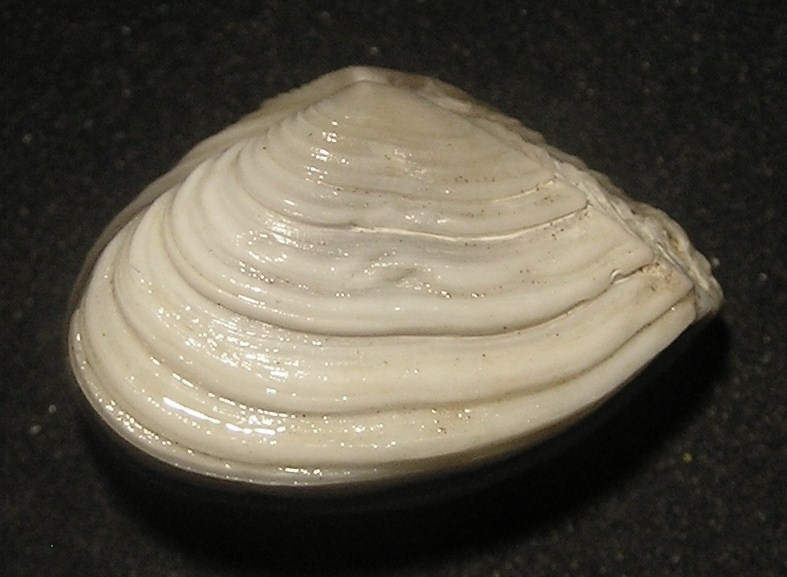
- Shell of a Corbula basket clam
  Corbula
  - †Corbula extenuata
  - †Corbula inaequalis
  - †Corbula subengota
  - †Corbula texana
- †Coronia
- †Corrundinium
- Corvus
  - †Corvus brachyrhynchos
- †Corynorynchus
- †Costaglycymeris
  - †Costaglycymeris mixoni
  - †Costaglycymeris subovata
  - †Costaglycymeris virginiae
- Cotonopsis
  - †Cotonopsis lafresnayi
- †Coturnipes – or unidentified comparable form
  - †Coturnipes cooperi
- †Coupatezia
  - †Coupatezia woatersi
- Crassatella
  - †Crassatella aquiana – type locality for species
- Crassinella
  - †Crassinella lunulata
  - †Crassinella minor
- Crassostrea
  - †Crassostrea virginica
- Crepidula
  - †Crepidula convexa
  - †Crepidula dumosa
  - †Crepidula fornicata
  - †Crepidula plana
  - †Crepidula radiata
  - †Crepidula spinosium
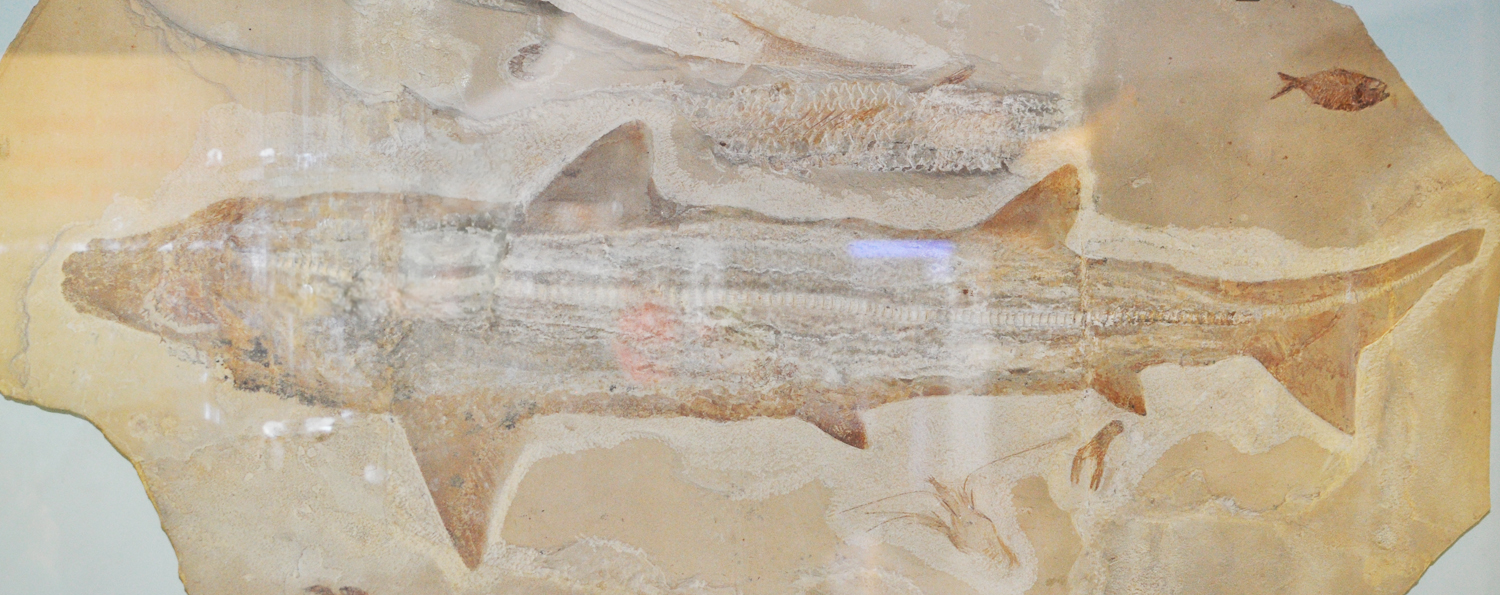
- Fossil of the Early Cretaceous-Eocene shark Cretolamna
  †Cretolamna
  - †Cretolamna appendiculata
- Cribrilina
  - †Cribrilina punctata
- †Cribroperidinium
- Crocodylus
  - †Crocodylus antiquus – type locality for species
- Crotalus
  - †Crotalus adamanteus – or unidentified comparable form
  - †Crotalus horridus
- Crucibulum
  - †Crucibulum constrictum
  - †Crucibulum costata
  - †Crucibulum ramosum
  - †Crucibulum striatum
- Cryptobranchus
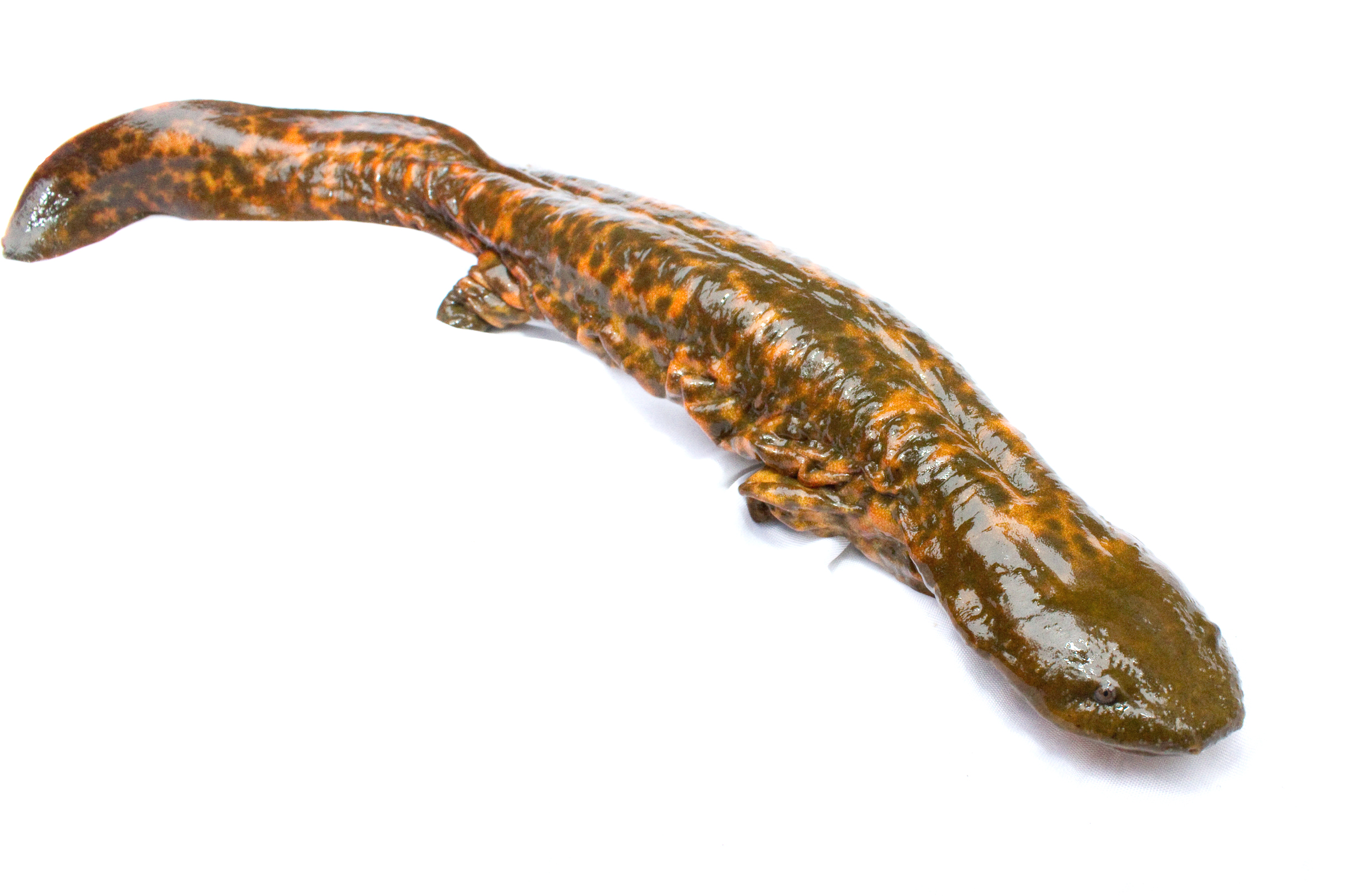
  - A living Cryptobranchus alleganiensis, or hellbender salamander
    †Cryptobranchus alleganiensis
- †Cryptogramma
  - †Cryptogramma acrosticoides
- Cryptosula
  - †Cryptosula pallasiana
- Cryptotis
  - †Cryptotis parva
- Ctena
  - †Ctena speciosa
- †Cubitostrea
  - †Cubitostrea divaricata
  - †Cubitostrea sellaeformis
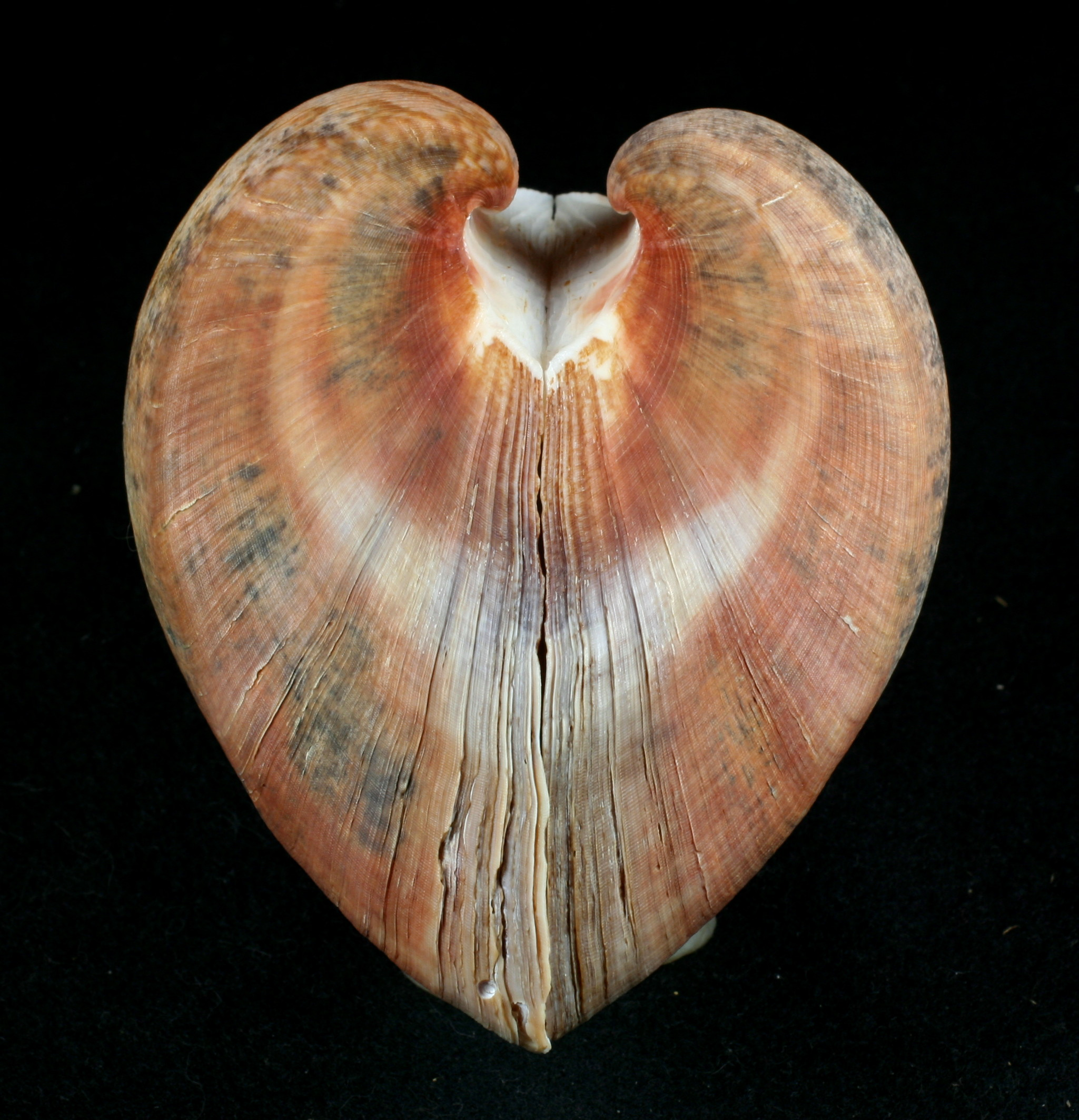
- Shell of a Cucullaea, or false ark shell
  Cucullaea
  - †Cucullaea gigantea
  - †Cucullaea transversa
- Cumingia
  - †Cumingia tellinoides
- †Cuneocorbula
  - †Cuneocorbula subengonata
- Cupuladria
  - †Cupuladria biporosa
  - †Cupuladria owenii
- Cyanocitta
  - †Cyanocitta cristata
- Cyclocardia
  - †Cyclocardia borealis
  - †Cyclocardia granulata
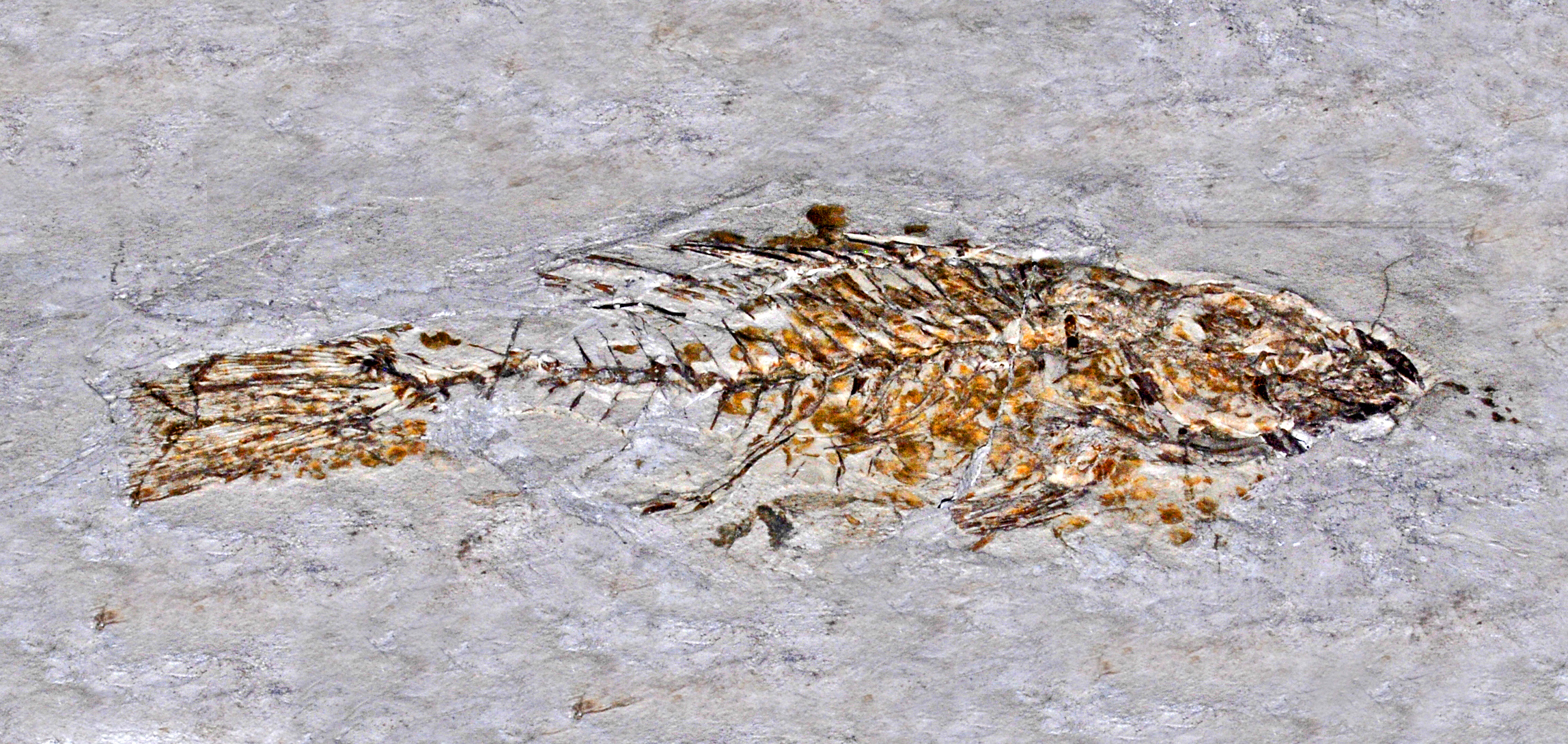
- Fossilized skeleton of the Eocene bony fish Cyclopoma
  †Cyclopoma
  - †Cyclopoma folmeri – type locality for species
- Cyclostremiscus
  - †Cyclostremiscus obliquestriatus
- Cylichna
  - †Cylichna cylindricus
  - †Cylichna cylindrus
  - †Cylichna venusta
- †Cylindracanthus
  - †Cylindracanthus rectus
- †Cymatogonia
  - †Cymatogonia amblyoceros
- Cymatosyrinx
  - †Cymatosyrinx lunata
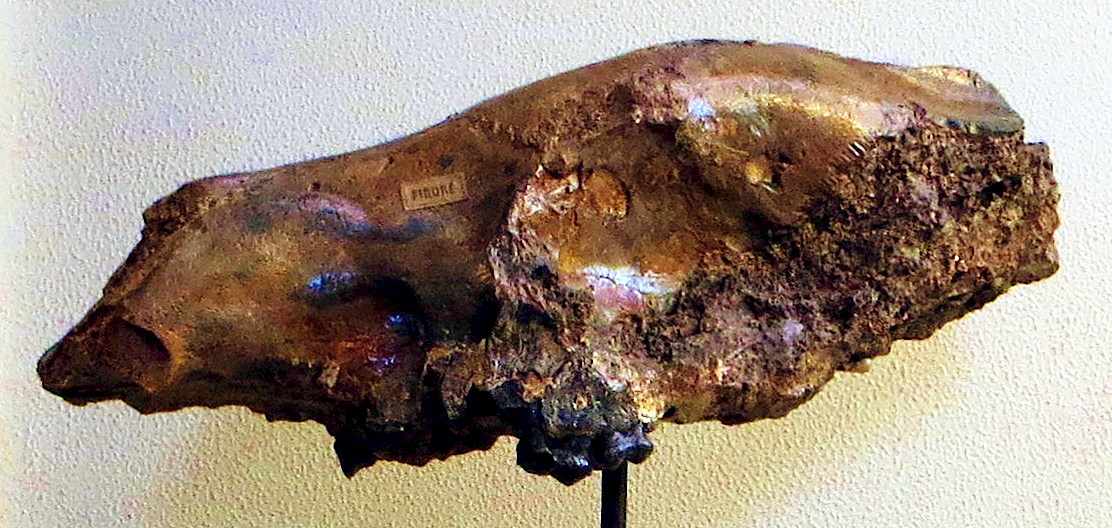
- Fossilized cranium of the Miocene bear-dog Cynelos
  †Cynelos
  - †Cynelos idoneus – or unidentified comparable form
- Cynoscion
- Cyrtopleura
  - †Cyrtopleura arcuata
  - †Cyrtopleura costata

== D ==
- †Dallarca
  - †Dallarca carolinensis
  - †Dallarca elevata
  - †Dallarca idonea
  - †Dallarca virginiae
- Dasyatis
- Dasypus
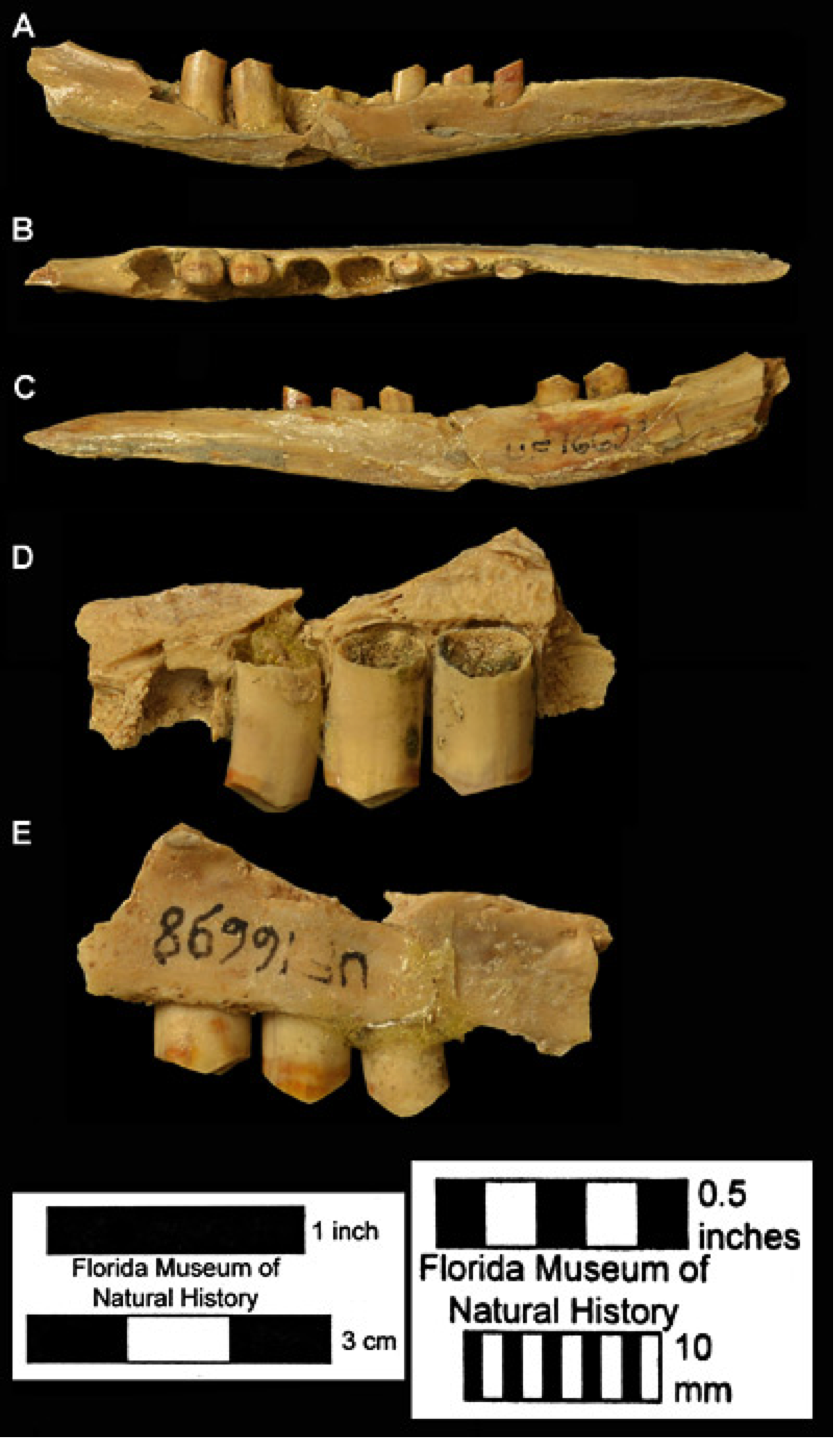
  - Fossilized mandible in multiple views of the Pleistocene Dasypus bellus, or beautiful armadillo
    †Dasypus bellus – or unidentified comparable form
- †Deflandrea
  - †Deflandrea phosphoritica
- †Delphineis
  - †Delphineis angustata
  - †Delphineis biseriata
  - †Delphineis novaecaesaraea
  - †Delphineis penelliptica
- Dendrocopos
  - †Dendrocopos pubescens
  - †Dendrocopos villosus
- †Dendrogapus – or unidentified comparable form
  - †Dendrogapus canadensis
- †Dendroica – or unidentified comparable form
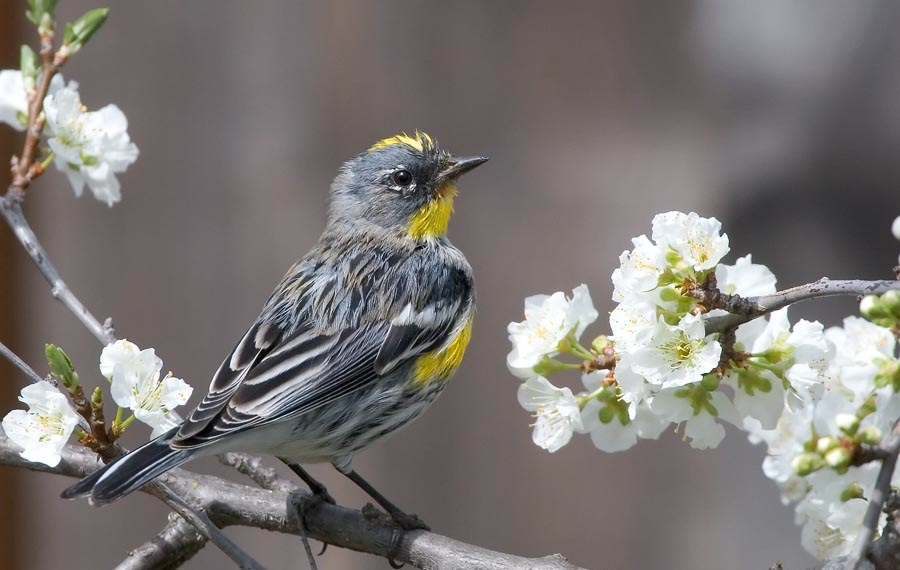
  - A living Setophaga coronata, or yellow-rumped warbler
    †Dendroica coronata
- Dentalium
  - †Dentalium alternatum
  - †Dentalium attenuatum
  - †Dentalium carolinense
  - †Dentalium carolinensis
- †Denticulopsis
  - †Denticulopsis hustedtii
- Dentimargo
  - †Dentimargo aureocinctus
- Desmognathus
- Diadophis
- Dicaelus
- †Diemichtylus
  - †Diemichtylus viridescens
- Dinocardium
  - †Dinocardium robustum
- Diodora
  - †Diodora auroraensis – or unidentified comparable form
  - †Diodora redimicula
- †Diorocetus
  - †Diorocetus hiatus
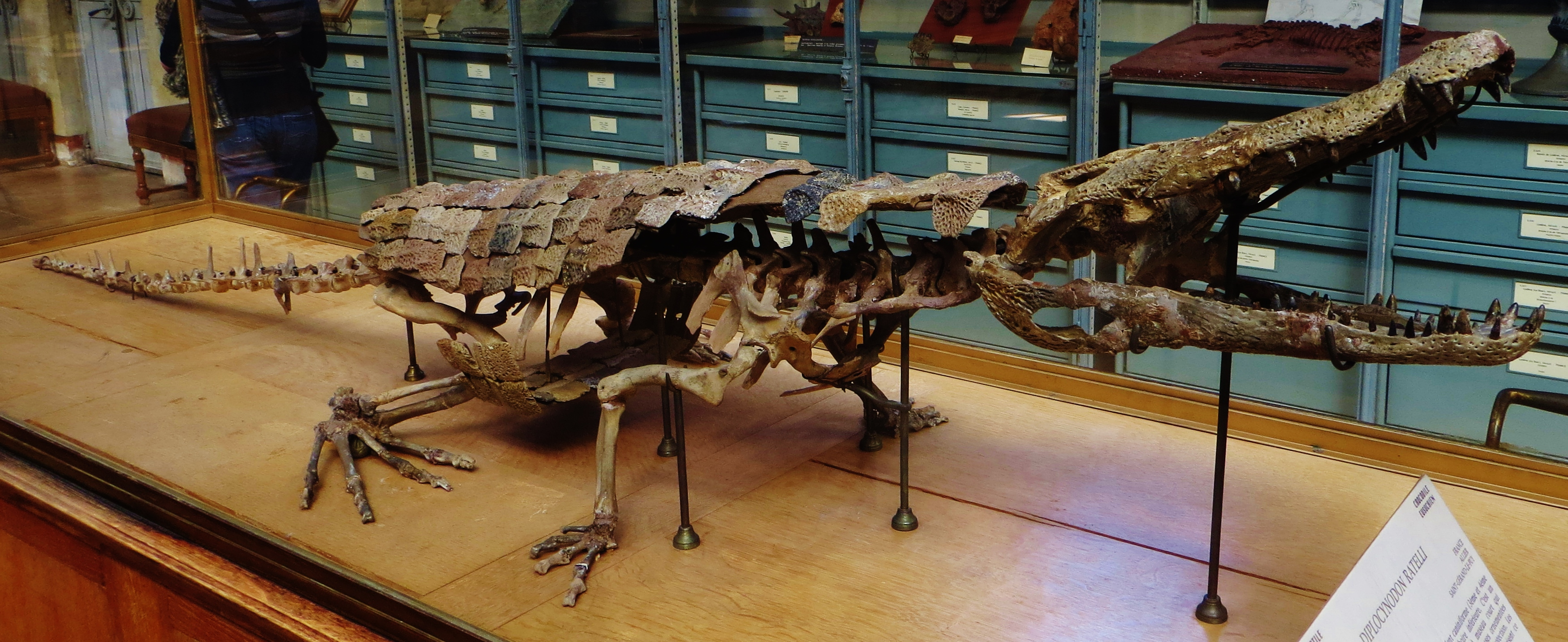
- Mounted fossilized skeleton of the Paleocene-Miocene crocodilian Diplocynodon
  †Diplocynodon
  - †Diplocynodon hantoniensis
- Diplodonta
  - †Diplodonta acclinis
  - †Diplodonta hopkinsensis
  - †Diplodonta leana
  - †Diplodonta punctata
  - †Diplodonta ungulina
- Discinisca
  - †Discinisca lugubris
- †Discoaster
- Discoporella
  - †Discoporella umbellata
- Discus
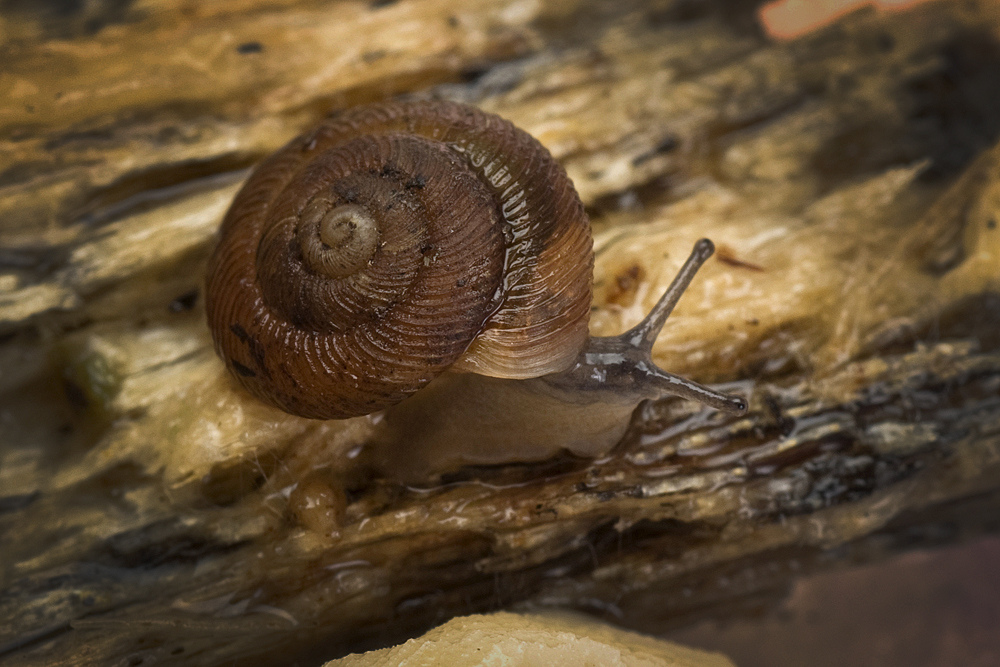
  - A living Discus catskillensis land snail, or angular disc
    †Discus catskillensis
- Divalinga
  - †Divalinga quadrisulcata
- †Dolicholatirus
- †Dolichonyx – or unidentified comparable form
  - †Dolichonyx oryzivorus
- †Dollochelys – tentative report
- Donax
  - †Donax parvula
  - †Donax variabilis
- Dosinia
  - †Dosinia acetabulm
  - †Dosinia acetabulum
  - †Dosinia discus
- †Dosiniopsis
  - †Dosiniopsis lenticularis
- Dryocopus
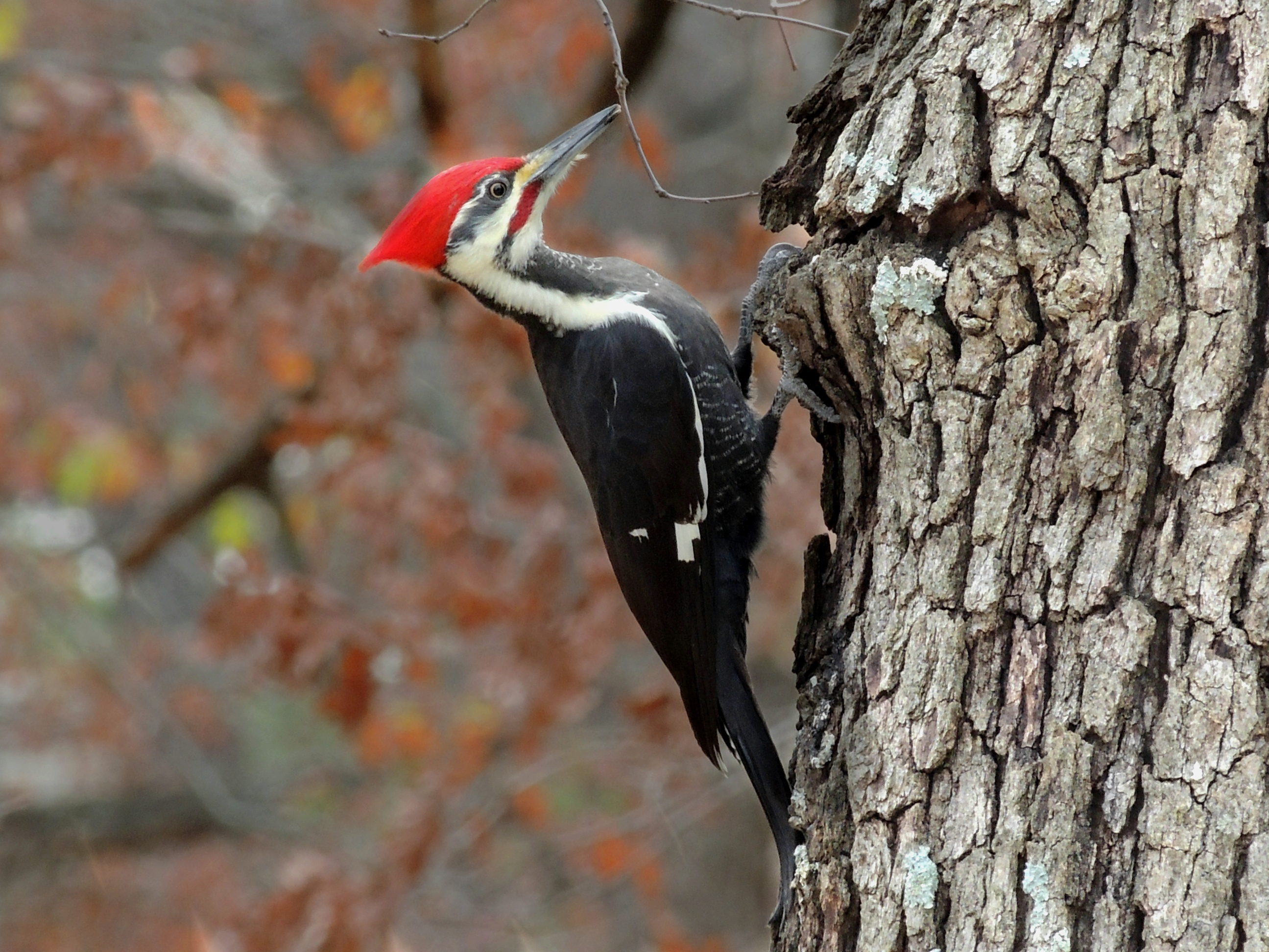
  - A living Dryocopus pileatus, or pileated woodpecker
    †Dryocopus pileatus

== E ==
- †Eburneopecten
  - †Eburneopecten dalli
  - †Eburneopecten scintillatus – or unidentified comparable form
- Echinocardium
  - †Echinocardium orthonotum
- Echinorhinus
  - †Echinorhinus priscus
- †Ecphora
  - †Ecphora gardnerae
  - †Ecphora kochi
  - †Ecphora quadricostata
  - †Ecphora tampaensis
- †Ectopistes
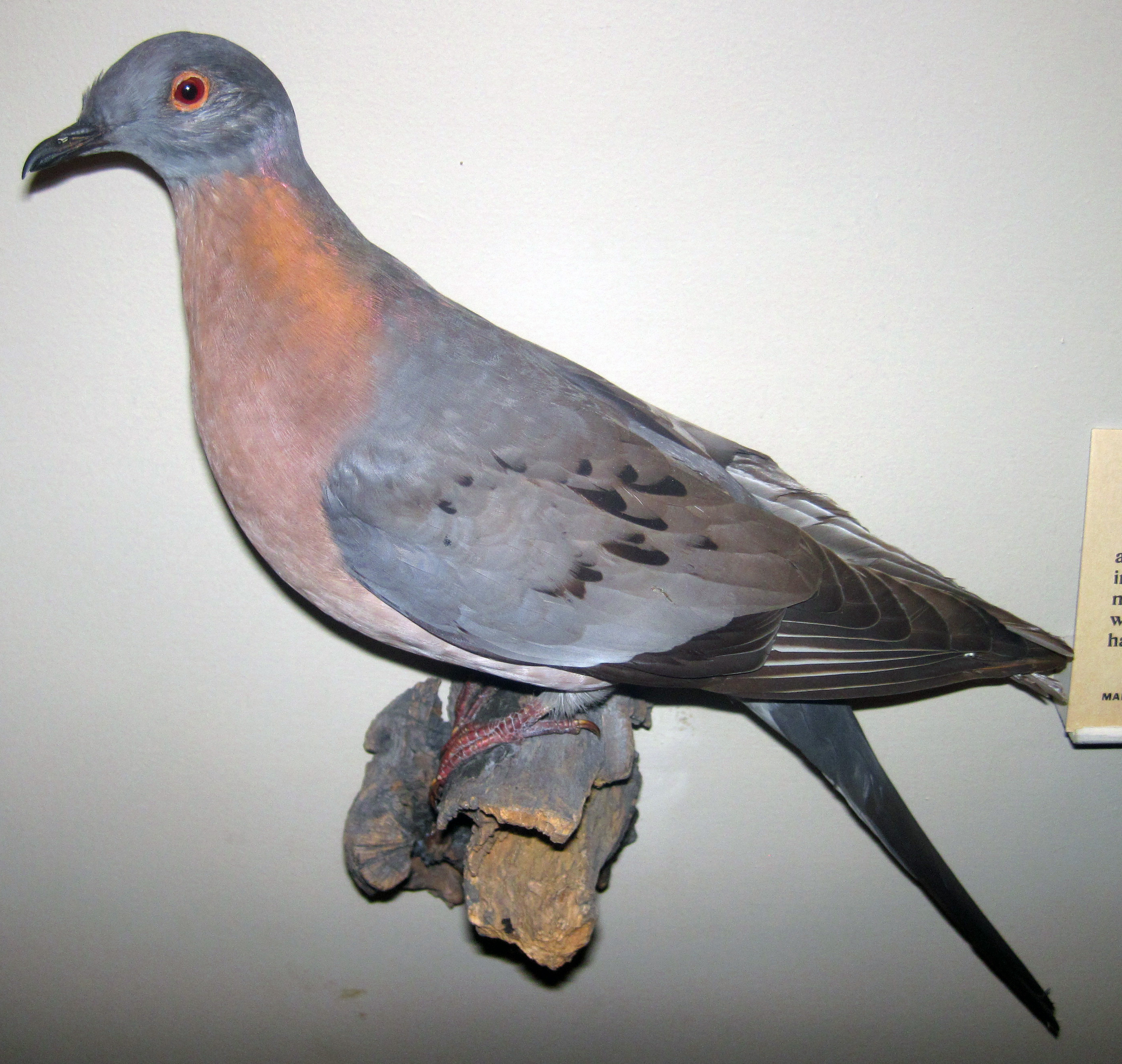
  - Taxidermied male Ectopistes migratorius, or passenger pigeon
    †Ectopistes migratorius
- †Egertonia
  - †Egertonia isodonta
- Elaphe
  - †Elaphe guttata – or unidentified comparable form
  - †Elaphe obsoleta – or unidentified comparable form
- Electra
  - †Electra monostachys
- Elphidium
  - †Elphidium articulatum
  - †Elphidium brooklynense
  - †Elphidium clavatum
  - †Elphidium discoidale
  - †Elphidium excavatum
  - †Elphidium galvestonense
  - †Elphidium gunteri
  - †Elphidium incertum
  - †Elphidium latispatium
  - †Elphidium subarticum
  - †Elphidium tumidum
- †Elytrocysta
- †Empidonax
- Ensis
  - †Ensis directus
  - †Ensis ensiformis
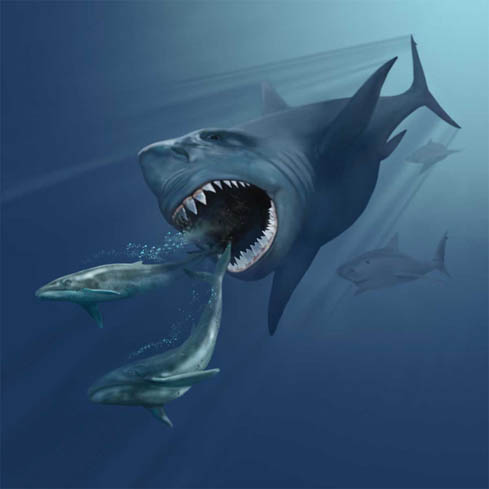
- Life restoration of two of the Miocene baleen whale Eobalaenoptera pursued by the giant shark Carcharocles megalodon
  †Eobalaenoptera – type locality for genus
  - †Eobalaenoptera harrisoni – type locality for species
- Eontia
  - †Eontia ponderosa
- †Eopleurotoma – or unidentified comparable form
  - †Eopleurotoma harrisi
  - †Eopleurotoma potomacensis
- †Eosphargis
  - †Eosphargis gigas
  - †Eosphargis insularis
- †Eosuchus
  - †Eosuchus lerichei
  - †Eosuchus minor
- Epitonium
  - †Epitonium angulatum
  - †Epitonium championi
  - †Epitonium humphreysii
  - †Epitonium multistriatum
  - †Epitonium potomacense
  - †Epitonium rupicola
  - †Epitonium virginianum
- Eptesicus
  - †Eptesicus fuscus
- Equus
  - †Equus complicatus
  - †Equus fraternus
- Eremophila
  - †Eremophila alpestris
- Erethizon
  - †Erethizon dorsatum
- Erolia
  - †Erolia minutilla
- †Erycinella
  - †Erycinella ovalis
- Eschrichtius
  - †Eschrichtius leptocentrus – type locality for species
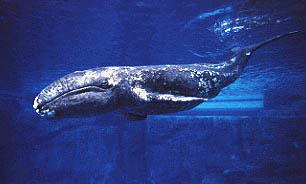
  - A living Eschrichtius robustus, or gray whale
    †Eschrichtius robustus
- Esox
  - †Esox americanus – or unidentified comparable form
- †Esthonyx – or unidentified comparable form
- Eucrassatella
- Eulima
  - †Eulima dalli
  - †Eulima rectiuscula
- †Euloxa
  - †Euloxa latisulcata
- Eumeces
  - †Eumeces laticeps – or unidentified comparable form
- Eupleura
  - †Eupleura caudata
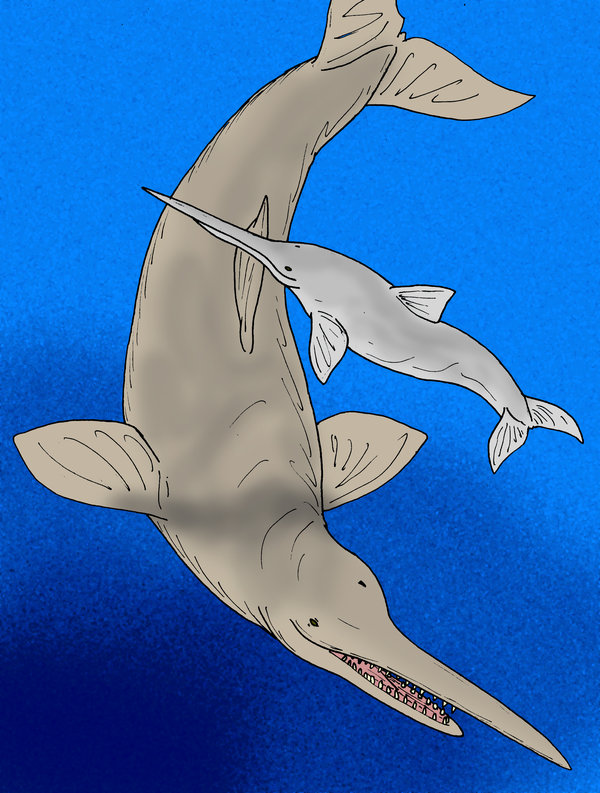
- Life restoration of the Miocene whale Eurhinodelphis (above)
  †Eurhinodelphis
  - †Eurhinodelphis longirostris
- Euspira
  - †Euspira heros
  - †Euspira marylandica
- Eutamias
  - †Eutamias minimus
- Euvola

== F ==
- Falco
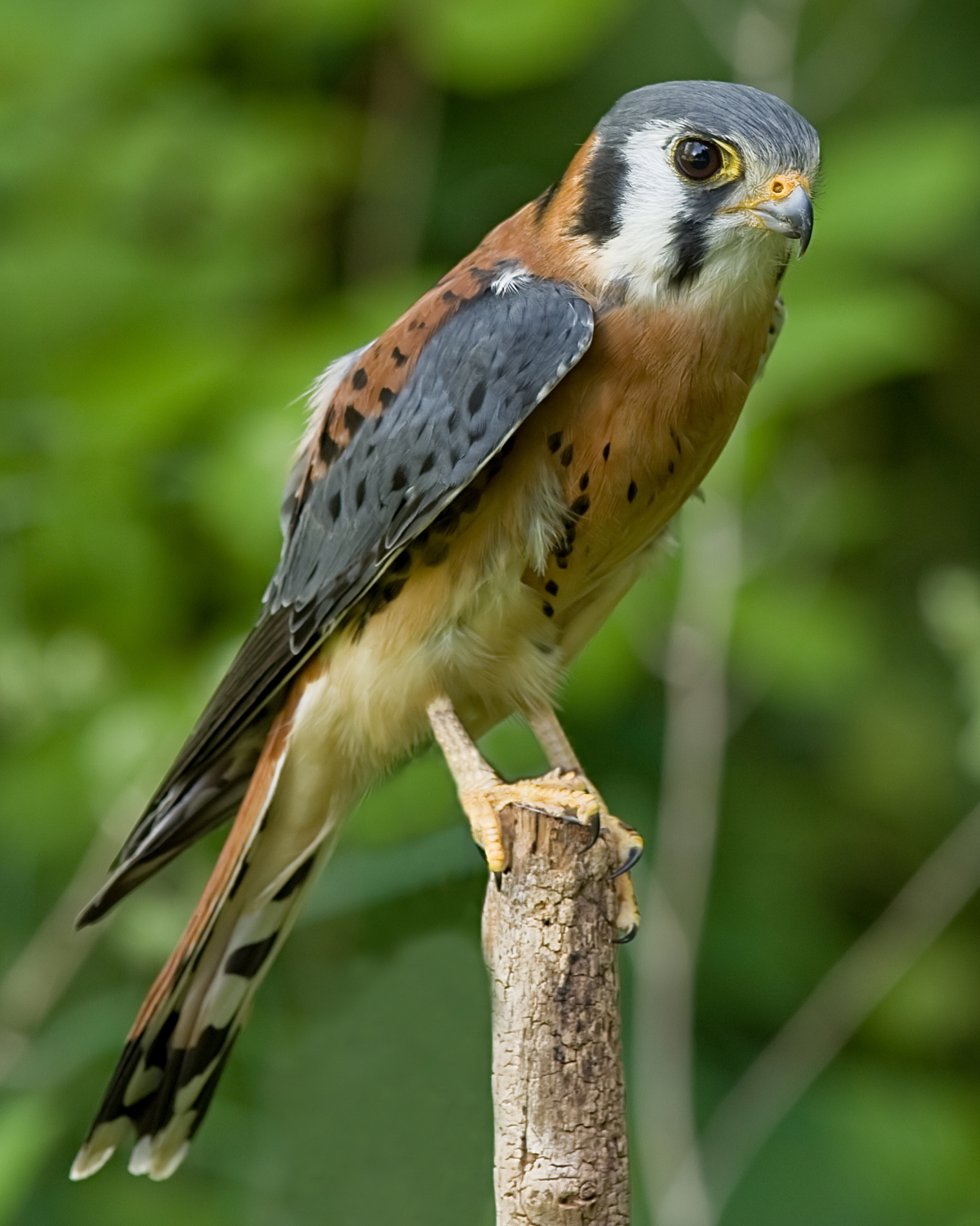
  - A living Falco sparverius, or American kestrel
    †Falco sparverius
- Felis
  - †Felis domesticus
- Ficus
  - †Ficus affinis
- †Fisherichthys – type locality for genus
  - †Fisherichthys folmeri – type locality for species
- Flabellum
- Fossarus
  - †Fossarus lura
  - †Fossarus lyra
- Fusinus
  - †Fusinus exilis

== G ==
- Gadus
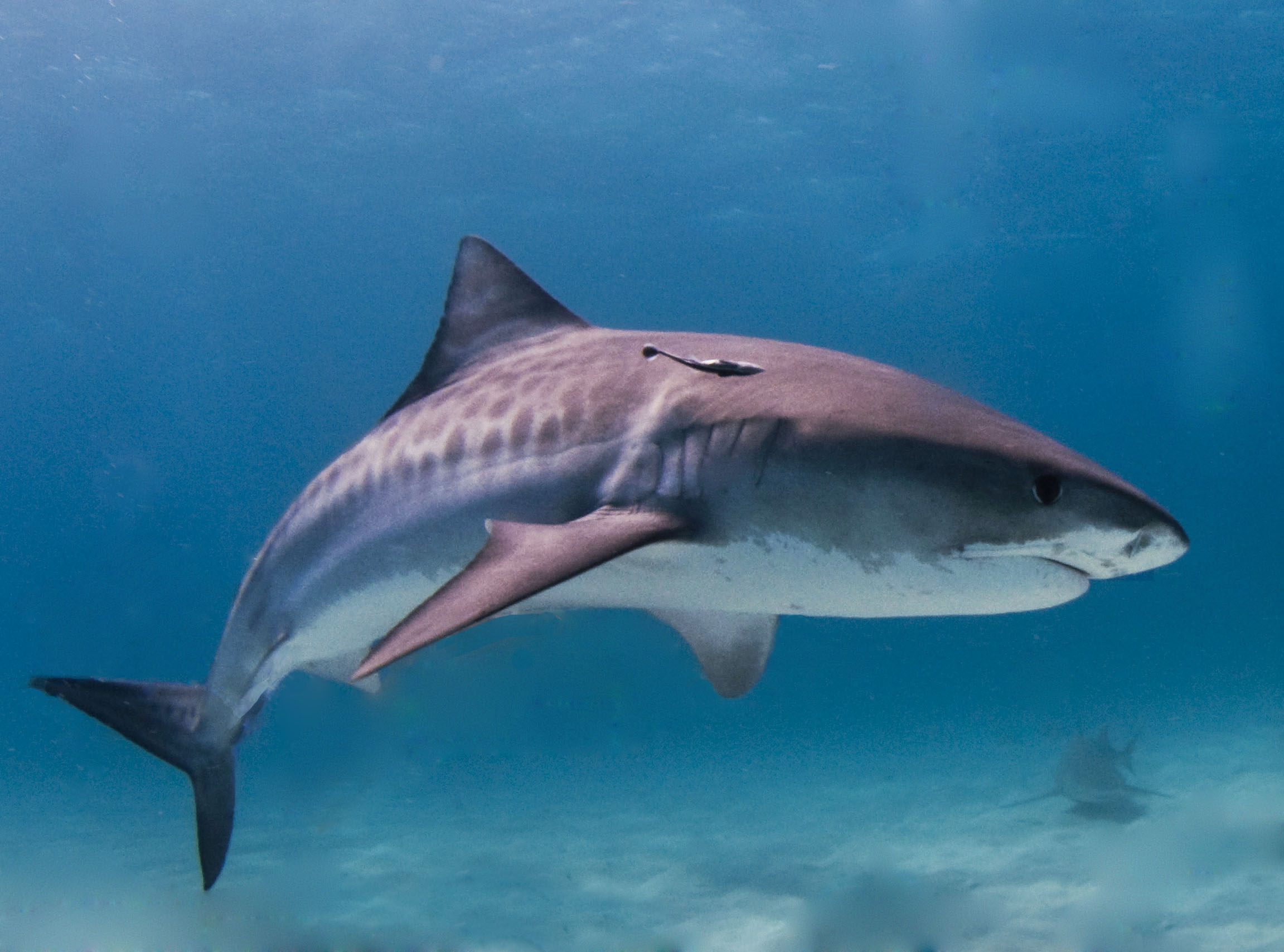
- A living Galeocerdo cuvier, or tiger shark
  Galeocerdo
  - †Galeocerdo aduncus
  - †Galeocerdo contortus
  - †Galeocerdo latidens
- Galeodea
- Galeorhinus
  - †Galeorhinus ypresiensis
- Galerita
  - †Galerita bicolor – or unidentified comparable form
- Gallinula
  - †Gallinula chloropus
- Gari
- Gastrochaena
- Gastrocopta
  - †Gastrocopta armifera
  - †Gastrocopta contracta
- Gavia
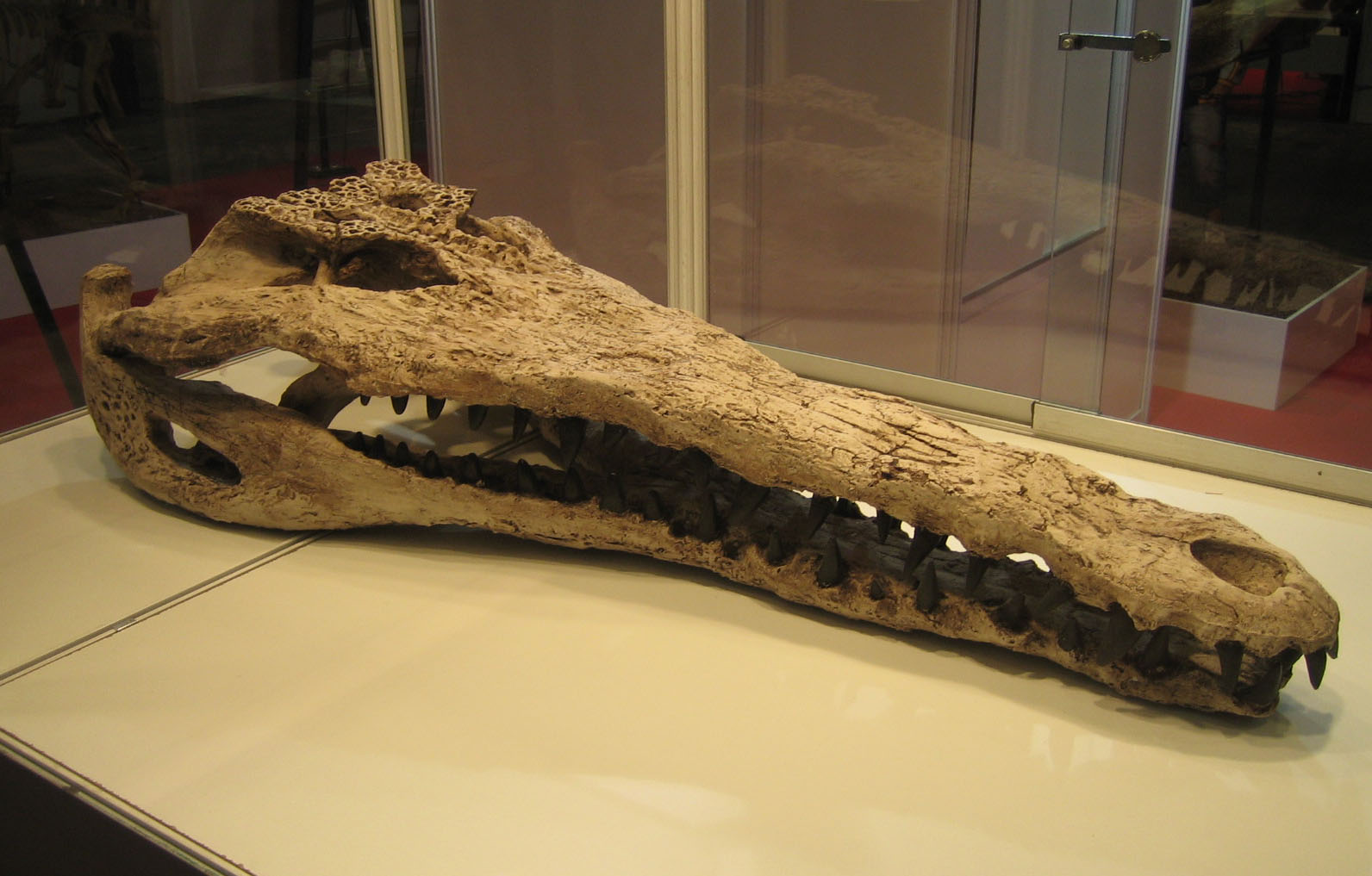
- Fossilized skull of the Miocene crocodile relative Gavialosuchus
  †Gavialosuchus
  - †Gavialosuchus antiquus
- Gemma
  - †Gemma magna
  - †Gemma purpurea
- Genota – or unidentified comparable form
  - †Genota bellistriata
- Geomys
- Geukensia
  - †Geukensia demissa
- Gibbula – tentative report
  - †Gibbula glandula
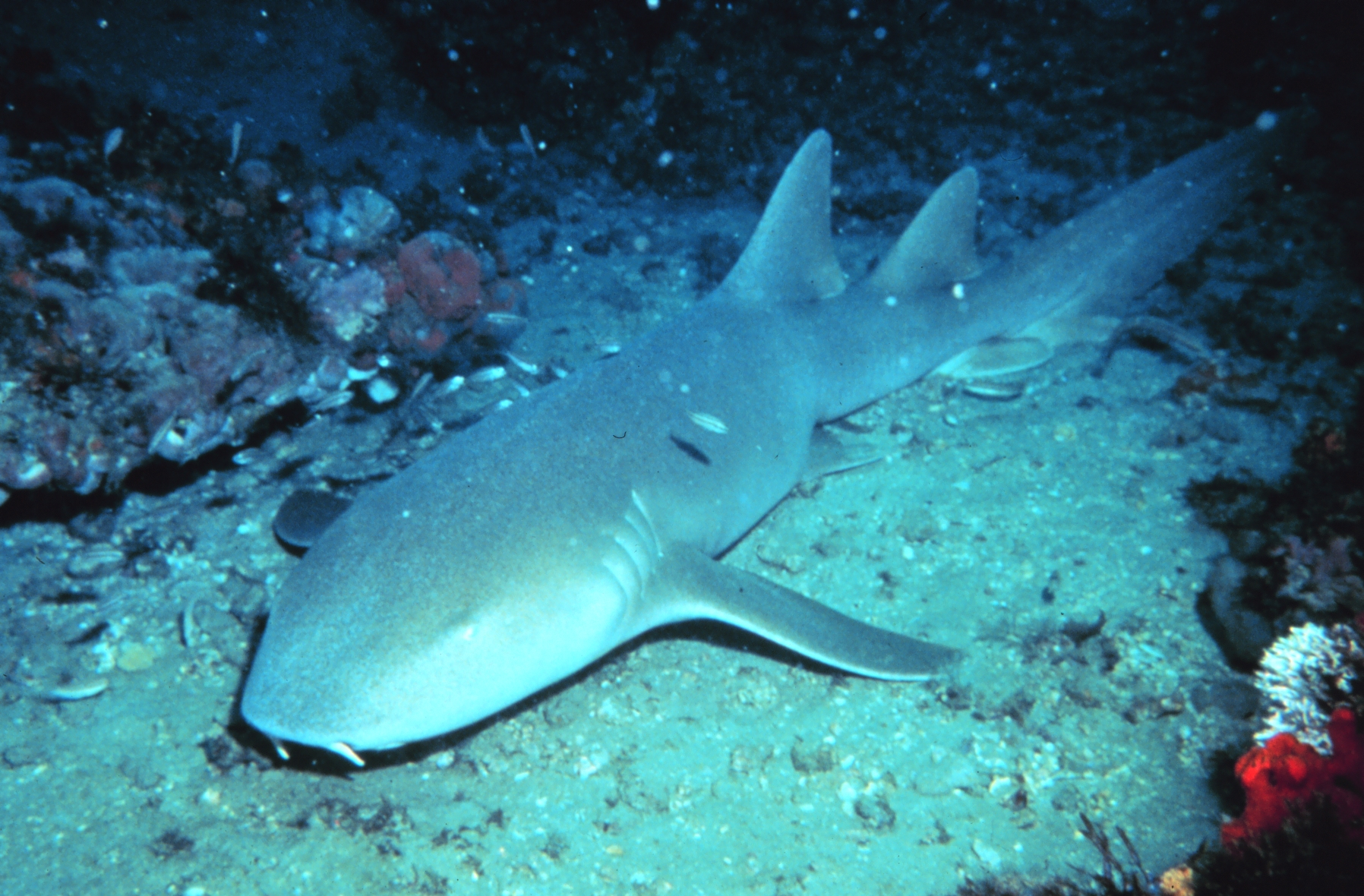
- A living Ginglymostoma nurse shark
  Ginglymostoma
  - †Ginglymostoma africanam
  - †Ginglymostoma serra
  - †Ginglymostoma subafricanum
- †Glaphyrocysta
- Glaucomys
  - †Glaucomys sabrinus
- Globigerina
  - †Globigerina apertura
- †Globoquadrina
  - †Globoquadrina hirsuta
- Globulina
- Glossus
  - †Glossus fraterna
  - †Glossus fraternas
  - †Glossus marylandica
  - †Glossus santamaria
- †Glottidia
  - †Glottidia inexpectans
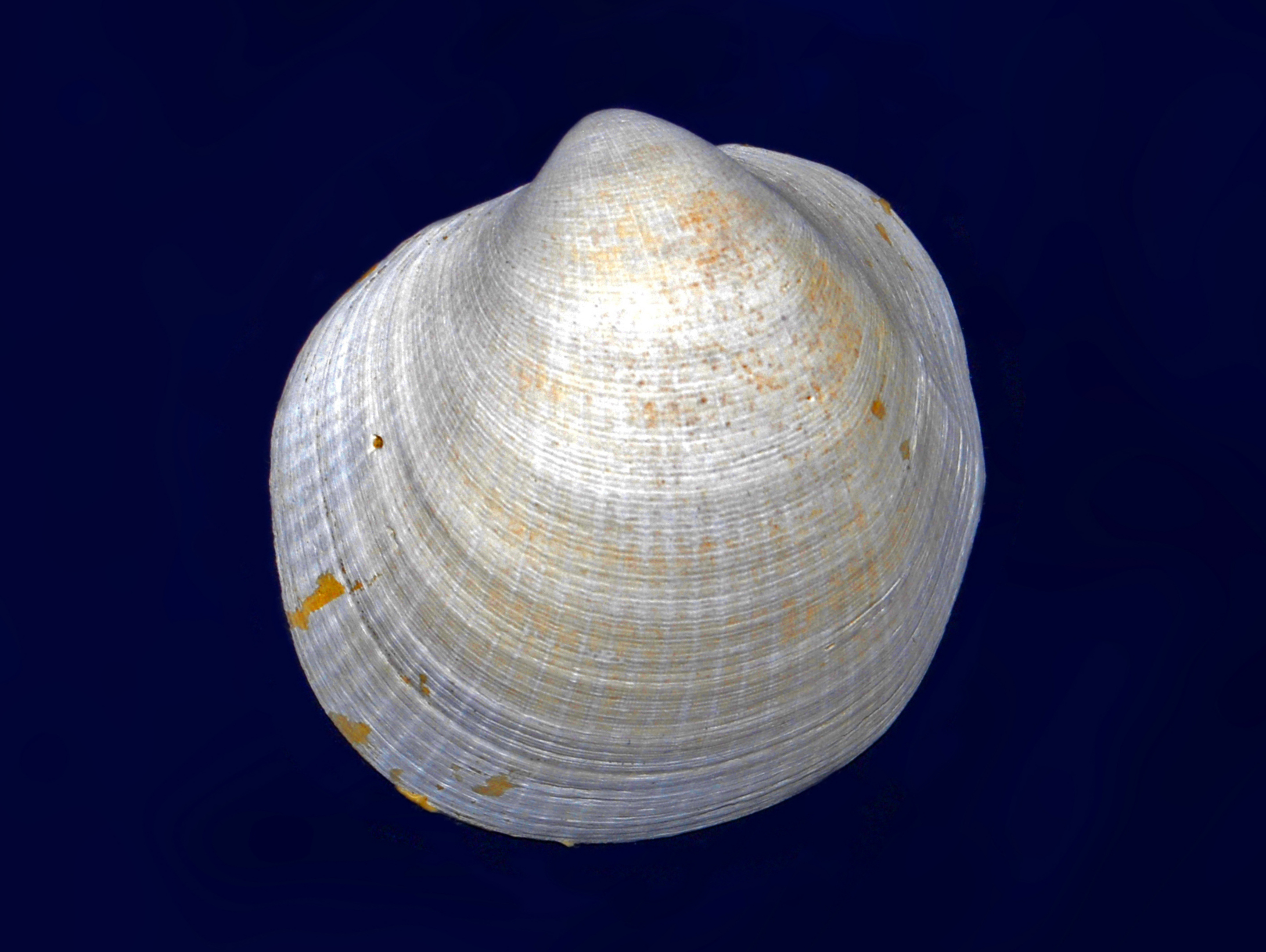
- Fossilized shell of a Glycymeris, or bittersweet clam
  Glycymeris
  - †Glycymeris americana
  - †Glycymeris idonea
  - †Glycymeris lisbonensis
  - †Glycymeris trigonella
  - †Glycymeris tumulus – or unidentified comparable form
- †Goniothecium
  - †Goniothecium rogersii
- Gouldia
  - †Gouldia metastriata
- Granulina
  - †Granulina ovuliformis
- Grus
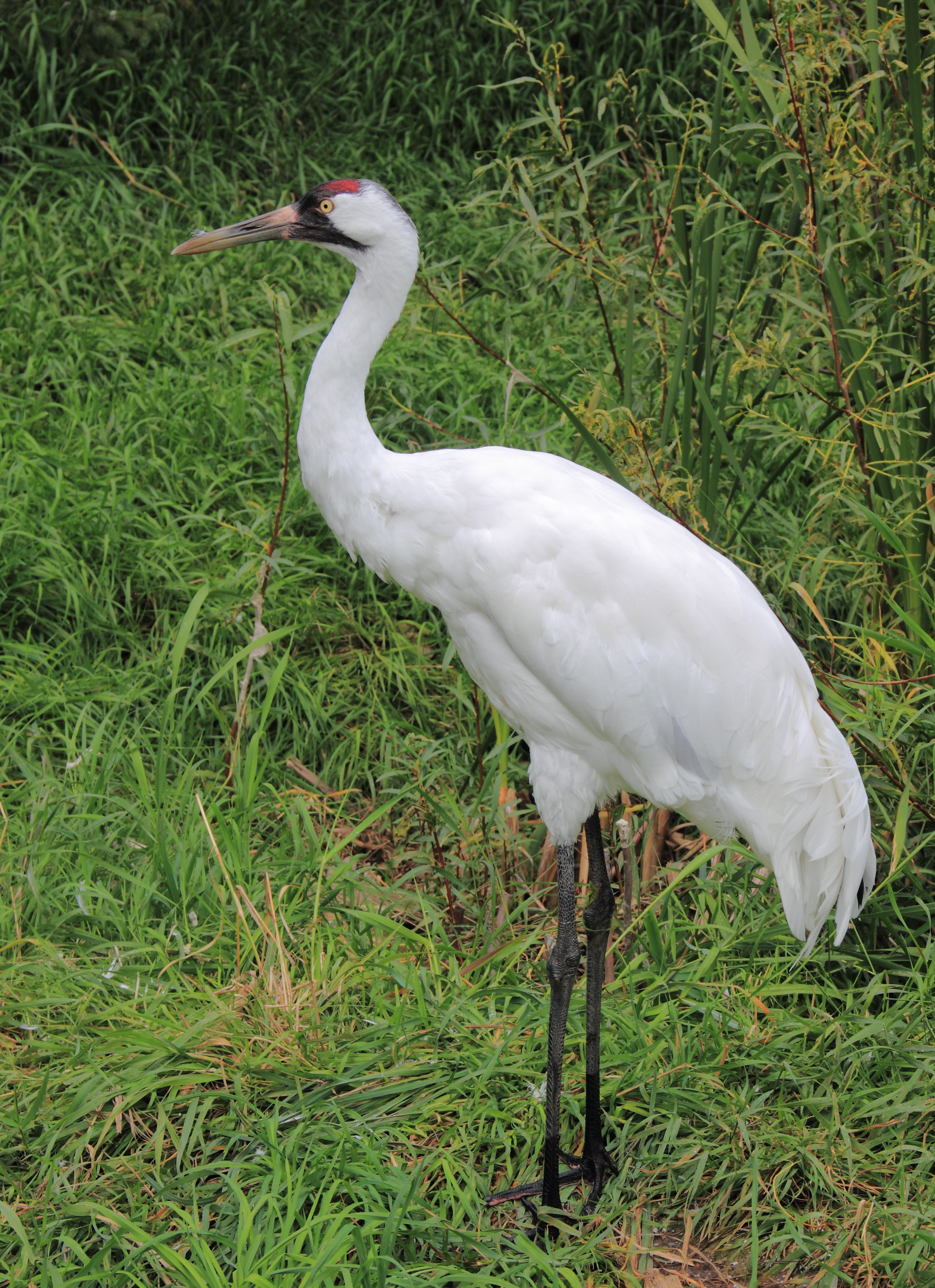
  - A living Grus americana, or whooping crane
    †Grus americana
- †Gryphaeostrea

== H ==
- †Hadrodelphis – or unidentified comparable form
  - †Hadrodelphis calvertense
- †Haldea
- †Halicetus – tentative report
  - †Halicetus ignotus
- Halichoerus
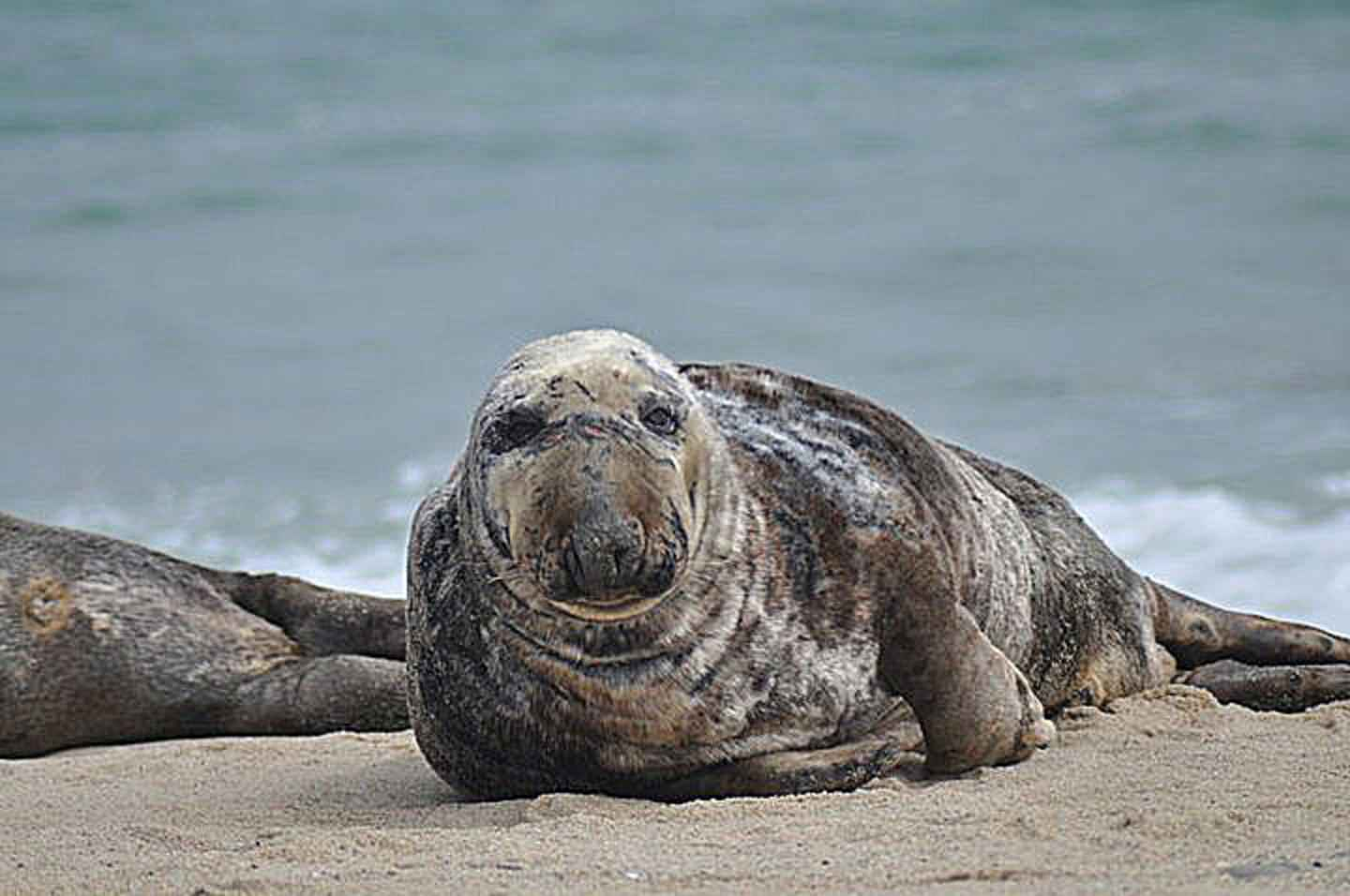
  - A living Halichoerus grypus, or grey seal
    †Halichoerus grypus
- Hanzawaia
  - †Hanzawaia concentrica
- Hastula
  - †Hastula simplex
- Haynesina
  - †Haynesina germanica
- Helicodiscus
  - †Helicodiscus inermis
  - †Helicodiscus jacksoni
  - †Helicodiscus parallelus
- Hemimactra
  - †Hemimactra confraga
  - †Hemimactra solidissima
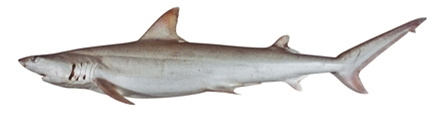
- A living Hemipristis weasel shark
  Hemipristis
  - †Hemipristis serra
- Hendersonia
  - †Hendersonia occulia
  - †Hendersonia occulta
- †Heteraulacacysta
- Heterodontus
  - †Heterodontus lerichei
- †Heterotorpedo
  - †Heterotorpedo fowleri
- Hexanchus
- Hiatella
  - †Hiatella arctica
- Hipponix
  - †Hipponix pygmaeus
- Hippoporidra
  - †Hippoporidra calcarea
- Hippoporina
  - †Hippoporina porosa
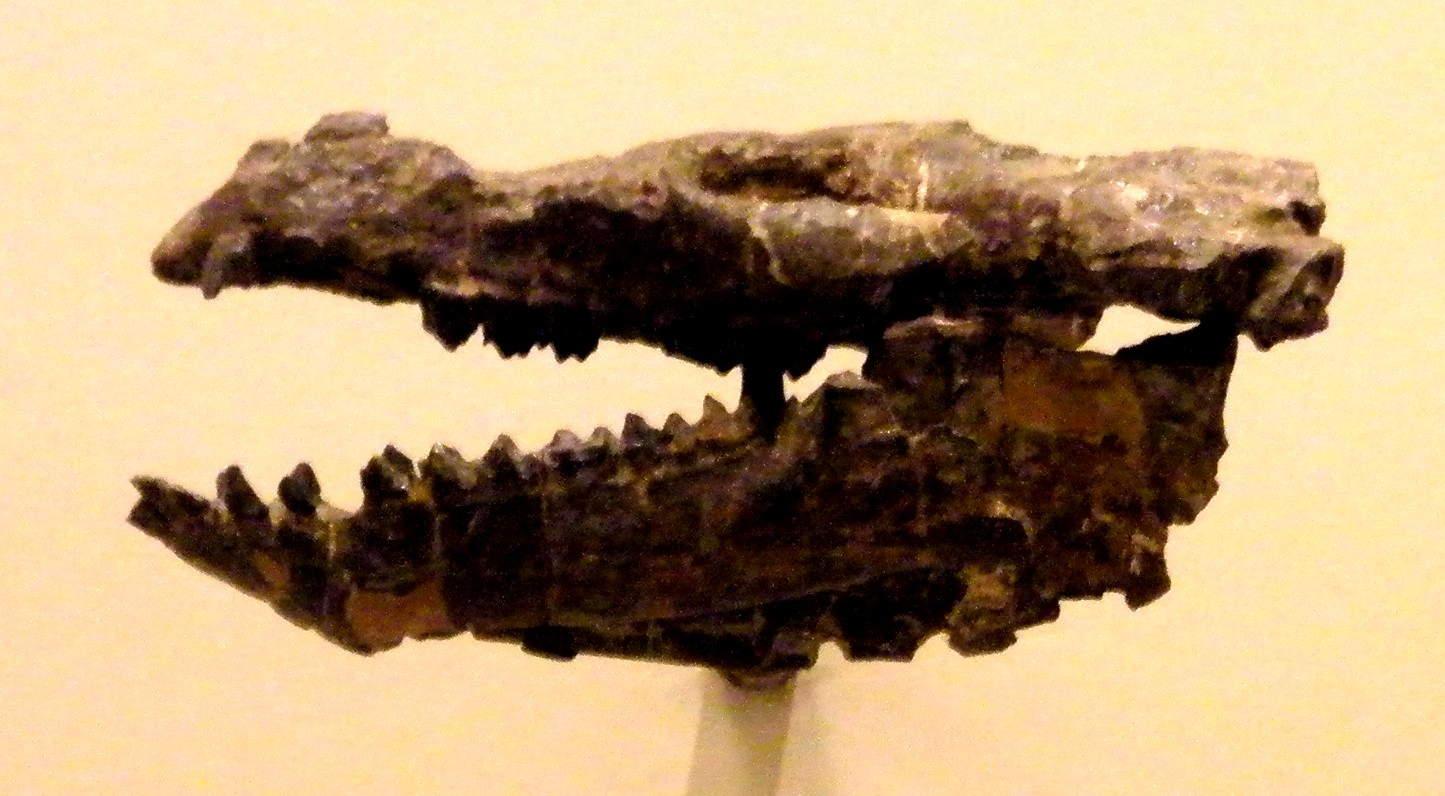
- Fossilized skull of the Eocene tapir-like mammal Homogalax
  †Homogalax – or unidentified related form
- Hydrobia
  - †Hydrobia truncata
- Hydroides
  - †Hydroides dianthus
  - †Hydroides diantthus
- Hyla
  - †Hyla crucifer – or unidentified comparable form
- Hylocichla
- †Hyopsodus – or unidentified comparable form
- †Hypolophodon
  - †Hypolophodon sylvestris
- †Hyposaurus – or unidentified comparable form
- †Hystrichokolpoma

== I ==
- †Icterus – or unidentified comparable form
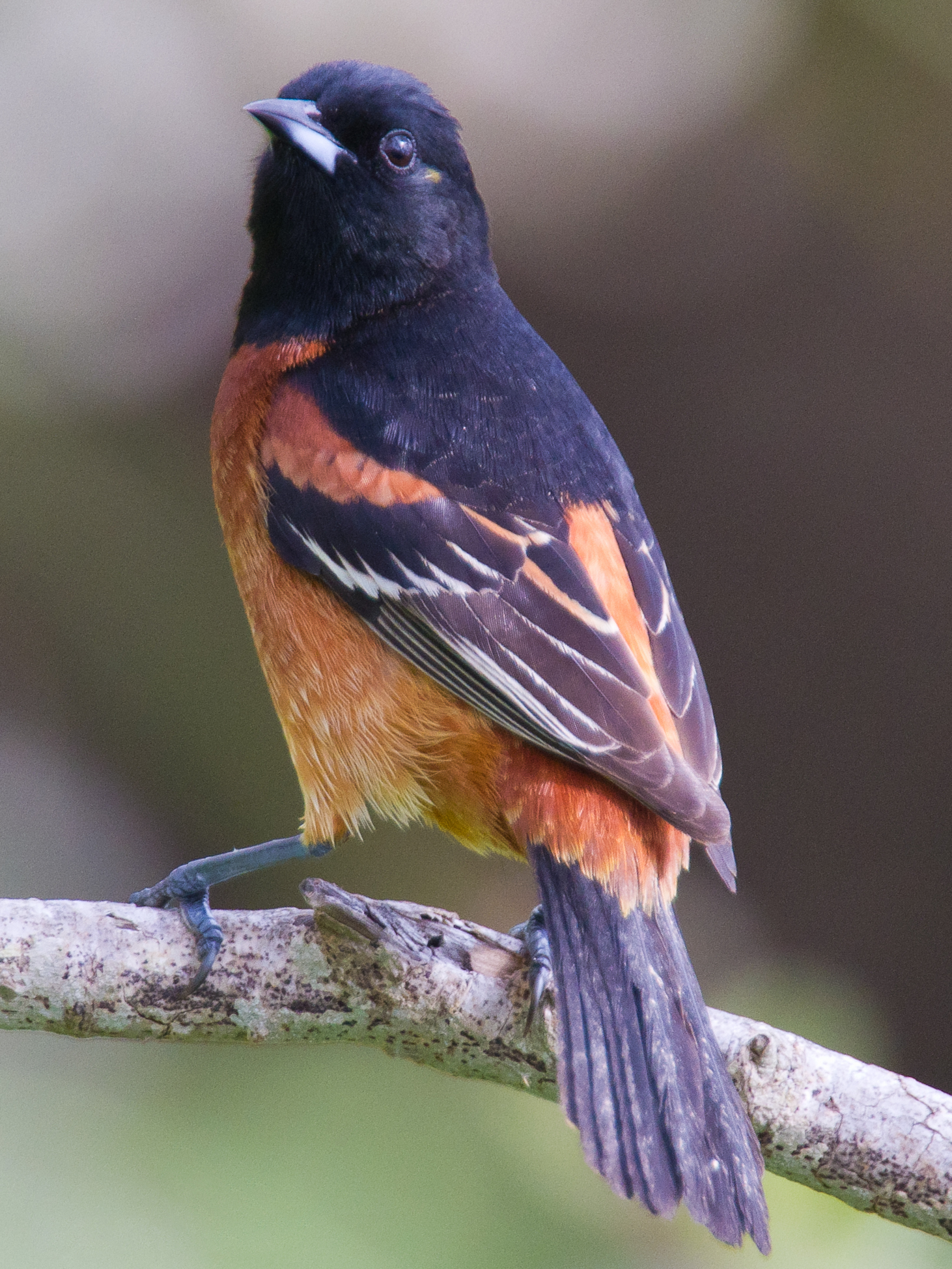
  - A living Icterus spurius, or orchard oriole
    †Icterus spurius
- Ilyanassa
  - †Ilyanassa arata
  - †Ilyanassa granifera
  - †Ilyanassa obsoleta
  - †Ilyanassa procina
  - †Ilyanassa trivittata
- †Iodes
  - †Iodes multireticulata
- Ischadium
  - †Ischadium recurvum
- Isistius
  - †Isistius trituratus
- †Isognomen
- †Isognommen
- Isognomon
  - †Isognomon maxilliata
  - †Isognomon maxilliatus
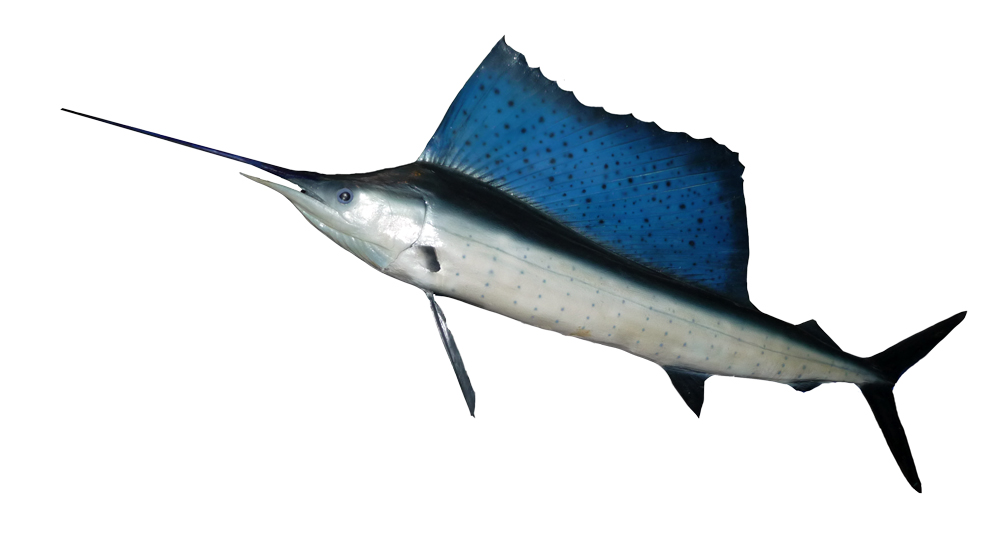
- A living Istiophorus , or sailfish
  Istiophorus
- Isurus

== J ==
- †Jacquhermania
  - †Jacquhermania duponti
- Junco
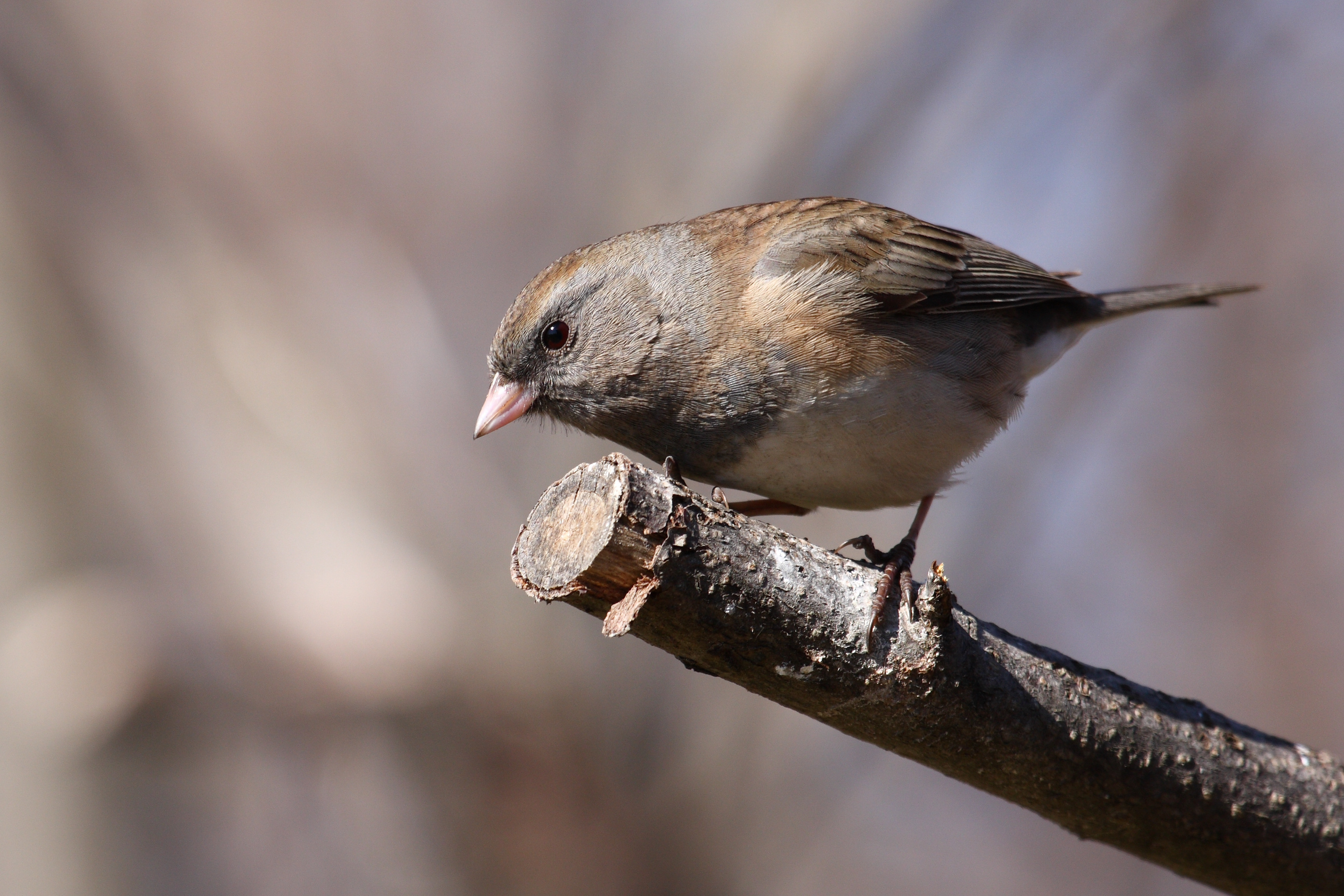
  - A living Junco hyemalis, or dark-eyed junco
    †Junco hyemalis

== K ==
- Kalolophus
  - †Kalolophus antillarum
- †Kapalmerella
  - †Kapalmerella mortoni
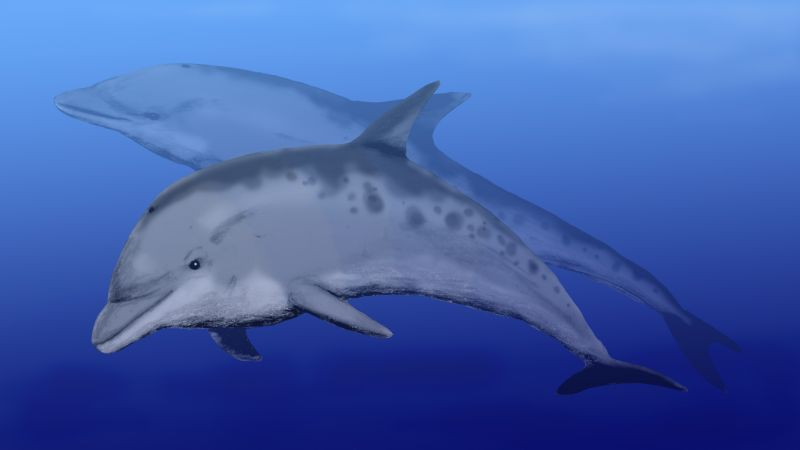
- Life restoration of the Oligocene-Miocene dolphin Kentriodon
  †Kentriodon
  - †Kentriodon pernix
- Kuphus
  - †Kuphus calamus
  - †Kuphus fistula
- Kurtziella
  - †Kurtziella cerina

== L ==
- †Laevihastula
  - †Laevihastula simplex
- Lagena
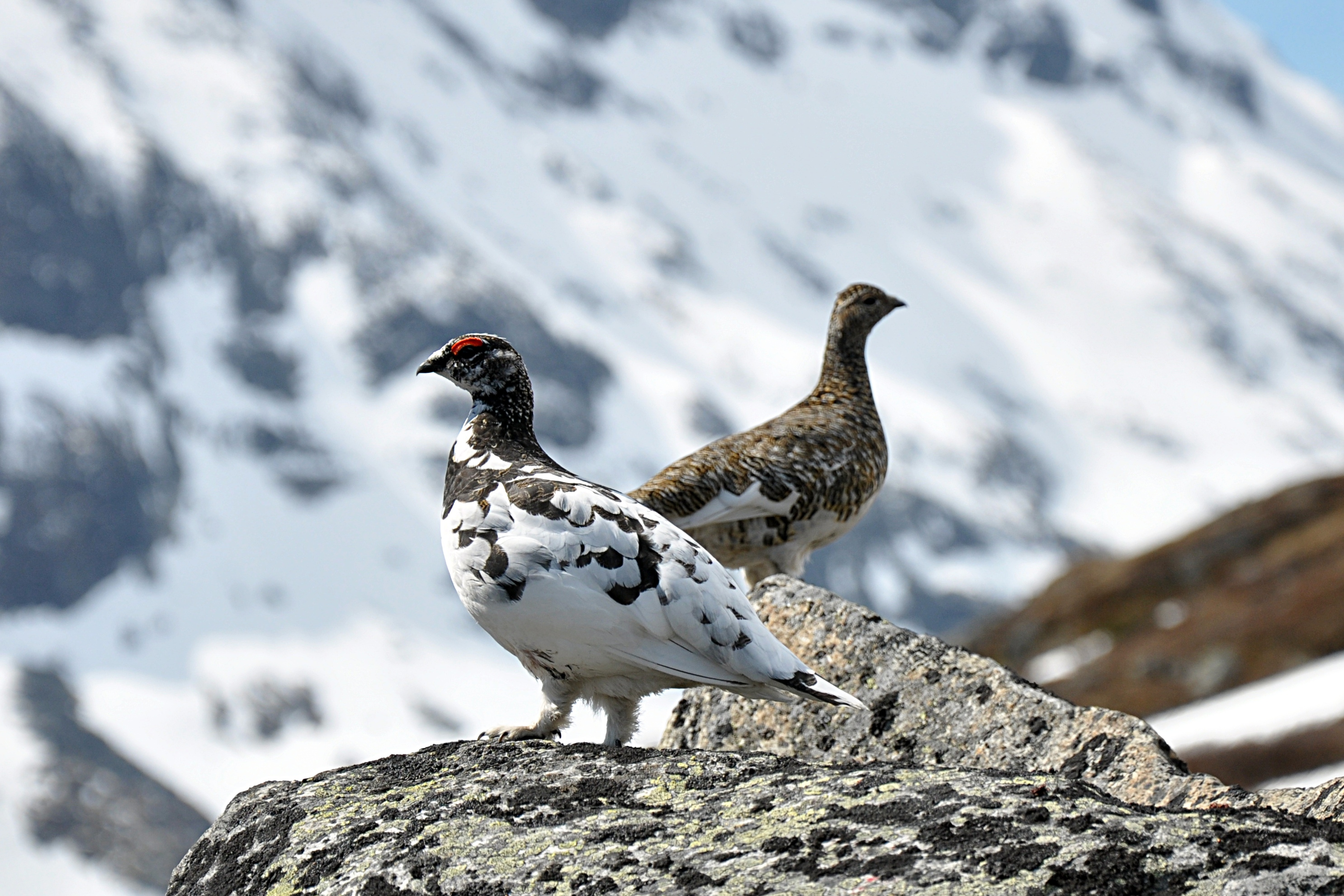
- Living Lagopus muta, or rock ptarmigan
  †Lagopus
  - †Lagopus mutus – or unidentified comparable form
- Lamna
  - †Lamna obliqua
- Lampropeltis
  - †Lampropeltis doliata
- Larus
  - †Larus hyperboreus
- Lasiurus
  - †Lasiurus borealis
- Latirus
  - †Latirus marylandicus
- Lepisosteus
- †Leptomactra
  - †Leptomactra delumbis
- †Leptophoca
  - †Leptophoca lenis
  - †Leptophoca proxima – or unidentified comparable form
- †Leptoxis
  - †Leptoxis carinata
- Lepus
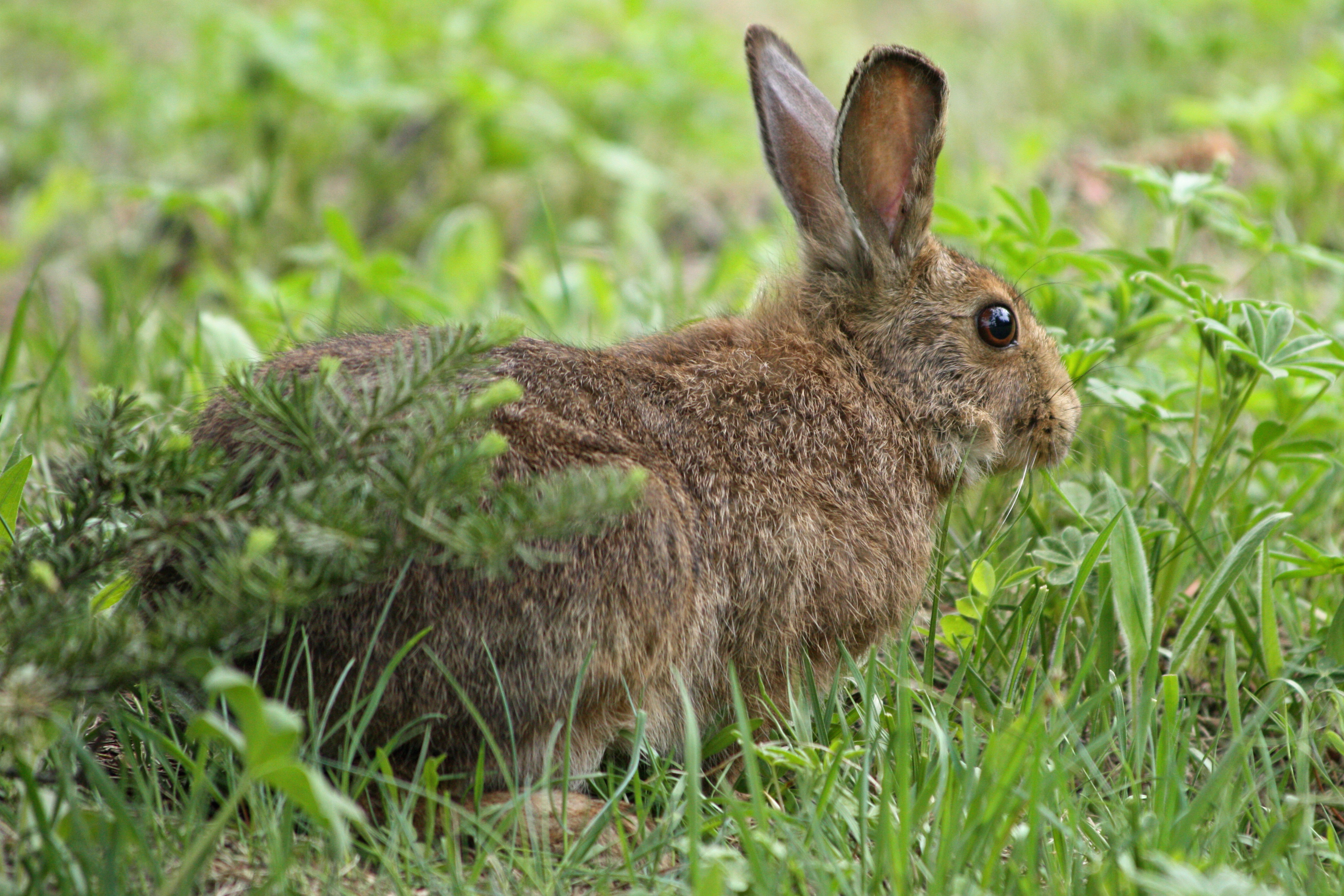
  - A living Lepus americanus, or snowshoe hare
    †Lepus americanus
- †Levifusus
  - †Levifusus trabeatus
- Libinia
  - †Libinia dubia
  - †Libinia emarginata
- †Limosa – or unidentified comparable form
- Linga
  - †Linga amiantus
- †Lingulodinium
  - †Lingulodinium machaerophorum
- †Lirodiscus
  - †Lirodiscus virginianus
- †Lirofusus – or unidentified comparable form
- Lirophora
  - †Lirophora alveata
  - †Lirophora dalli
  - †Lirophora latilirata
  - †Lirophora vredenburgi
- †Lirosoma
  - †Lirosoma sulcata
  - †Lirosoma sulcosa
- Litiopa
  - †Litiopa marylandica
- Littoraria
  - †Littoraria irrorata
- Lontra
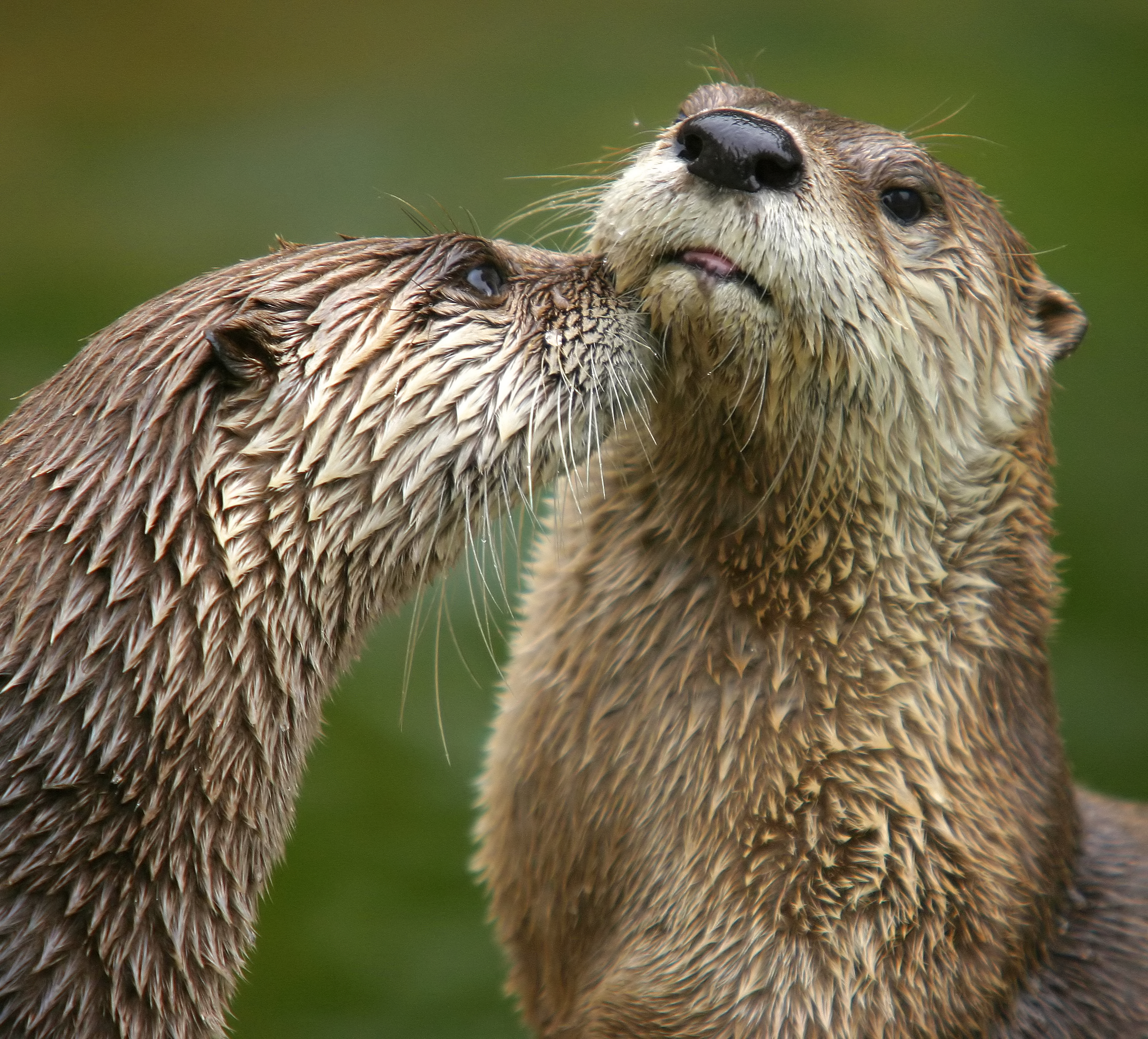
  - Pair of living Lontra canadensis, or North American river otter
    †Lontra canadensis
- Lophius
  - †Lophius sagittidens
- †Lophocysta – tentative report
- Lophodytes
  - †Lophodytes cucullatus
- Lopholatilus
- Loxia
- Lucina
  - †Lucina aquiana – type locality for species
  - †Lucina divaricata
  - †Lucina pomilia
  - †Lucina squamata
- Lucinisca
  - †Lucinisca cribarius
- Lucinoma
  - †Lucinoma contracta
- Lunatia
  - †Lunatia interna
- †Lutianus
- Lydiphnis
  - †Lydiphnis novicastri
- Lymnaea
  - †Lymnaea catascopium
- Lynx
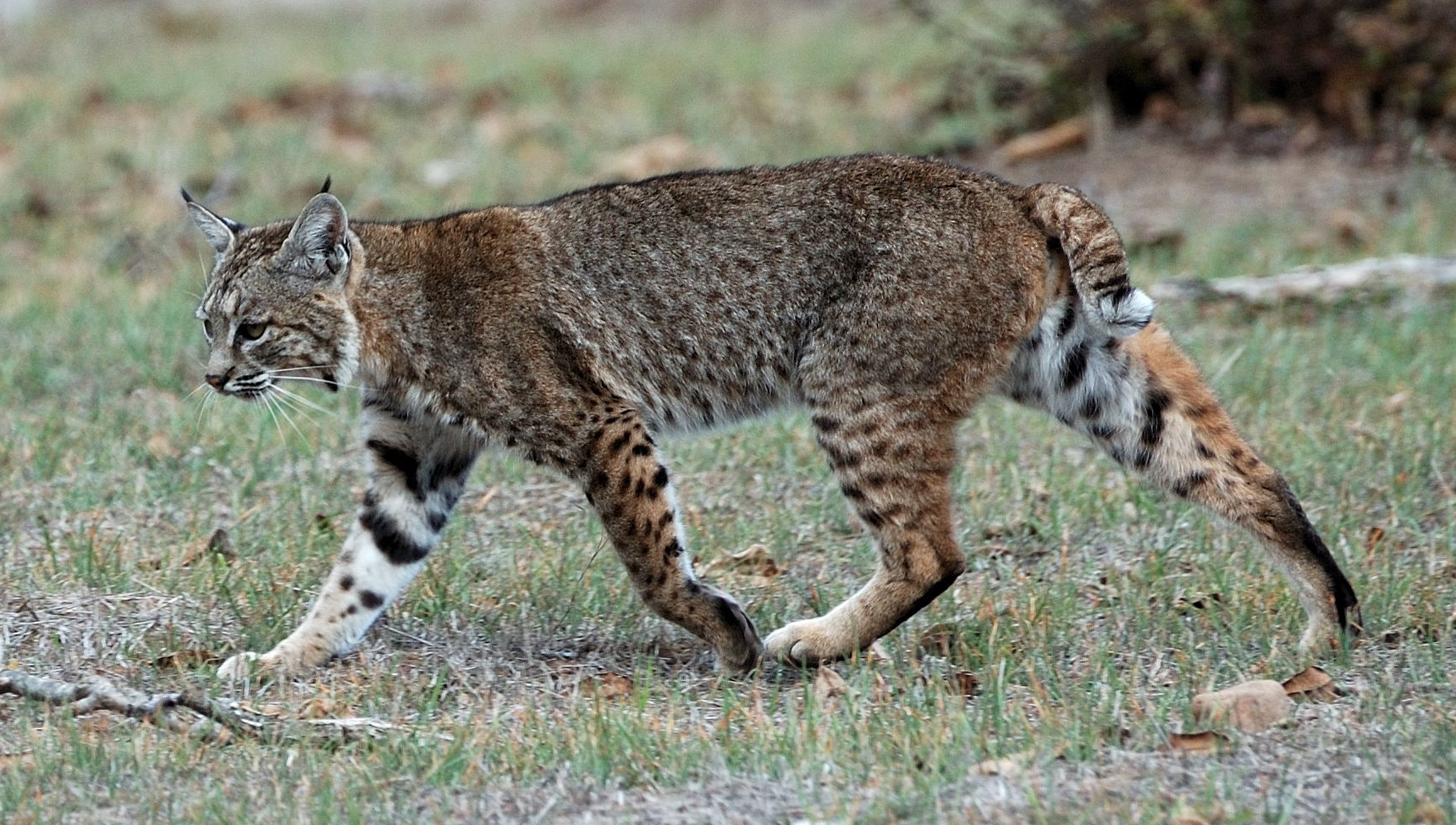
  - A living Lynx rufus, or bobcat
    †Lynx rufus – or unidentified comparable form
- Lyonsia
  - †Lyonsia hyalina

== M ==
- Macoma
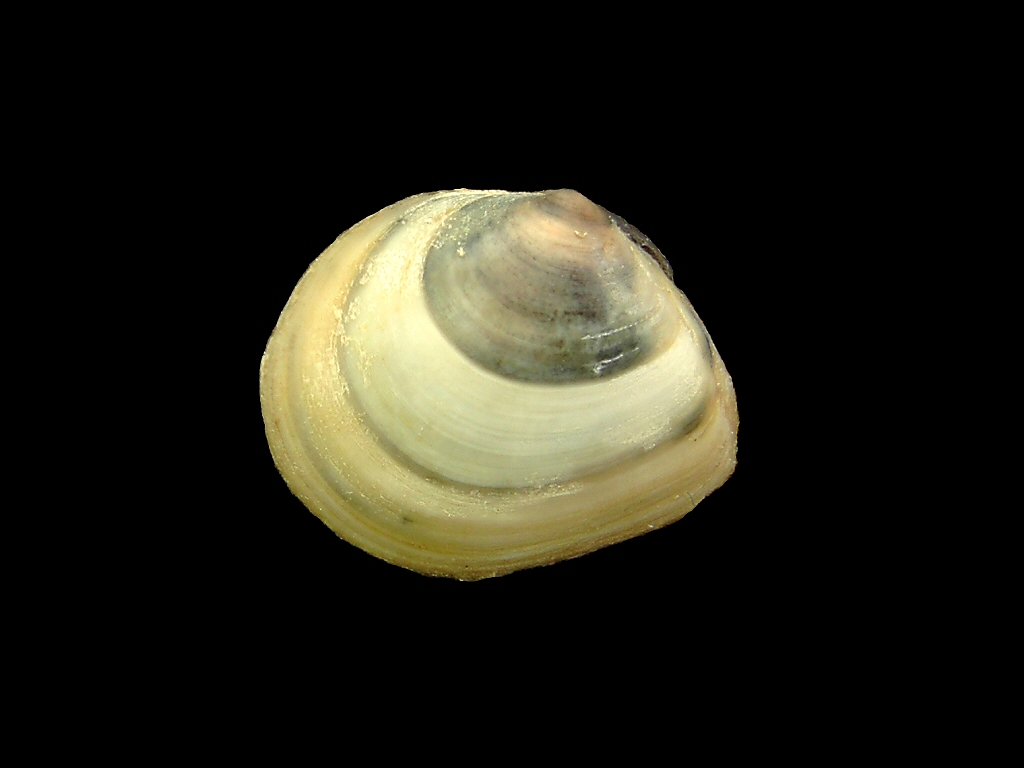
  - Shell of a Limecola balthica, or Baltic clam
    †Macoma balthica
  - †Macoma calcarea
  - †Macoma constricta
  - †Macoma tenta
- Macrocallista
  - †Macrocallista reposta
  - †Macrocallista subimpressa
- Mactrodesma
  - †Mactrodesma subponderosa
- †Mactropsis
  - †Mactropsis olssoni
- Makaira
  - †Makaira nigricans – or unidentified comparable form
- †Mammut
  - †Mammut americaneum
  - †Mammut americanum
- †Mammuthus
  - †Mammuthus columbi
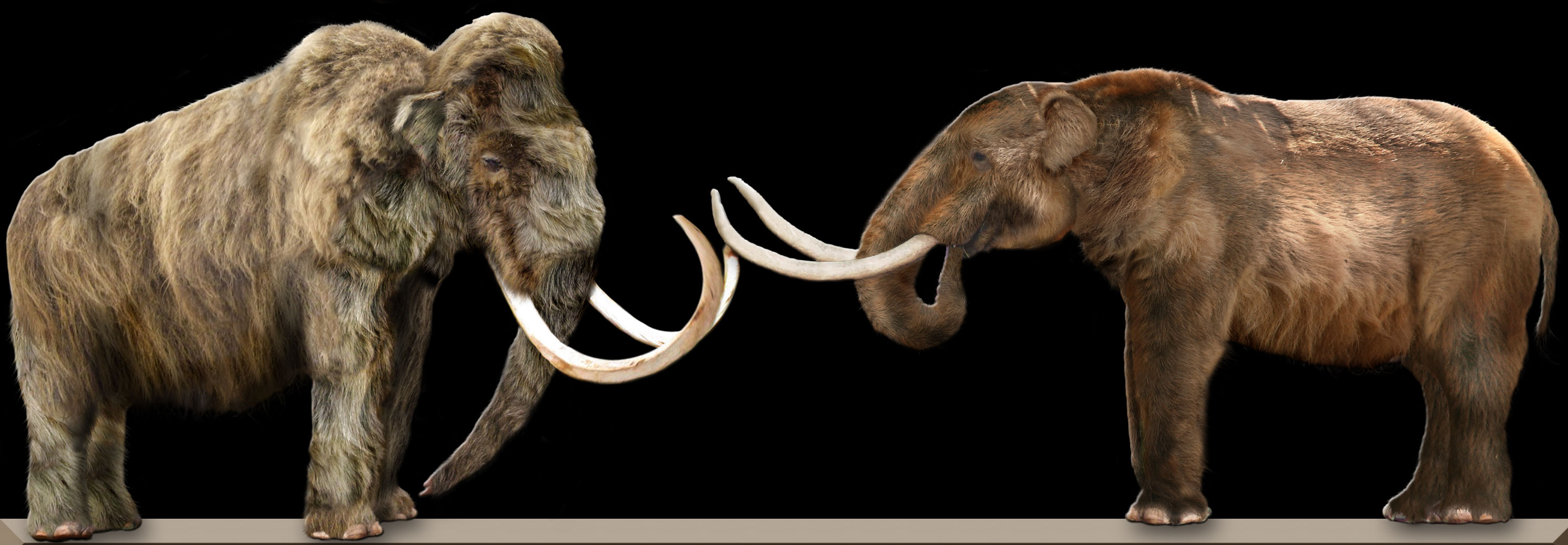
  - Life restorations of a Mammut americanum, or American mastodon (right), and a Mammuthus primigenius, or wooly mammoth (left)
    †Mammuthus primigenius
- Marevalvata
  - †Marevalvata tricarinata
- †Margaritaria
  - †Margaritaria abrupta
- Marginella
  - †Marginella bella
  - †Marginella denticulata
- †Mariacolpus
  - †Mariacolpus plebeia
- †Mariafusus
  - †Mariafusus marylandica
- Marmota
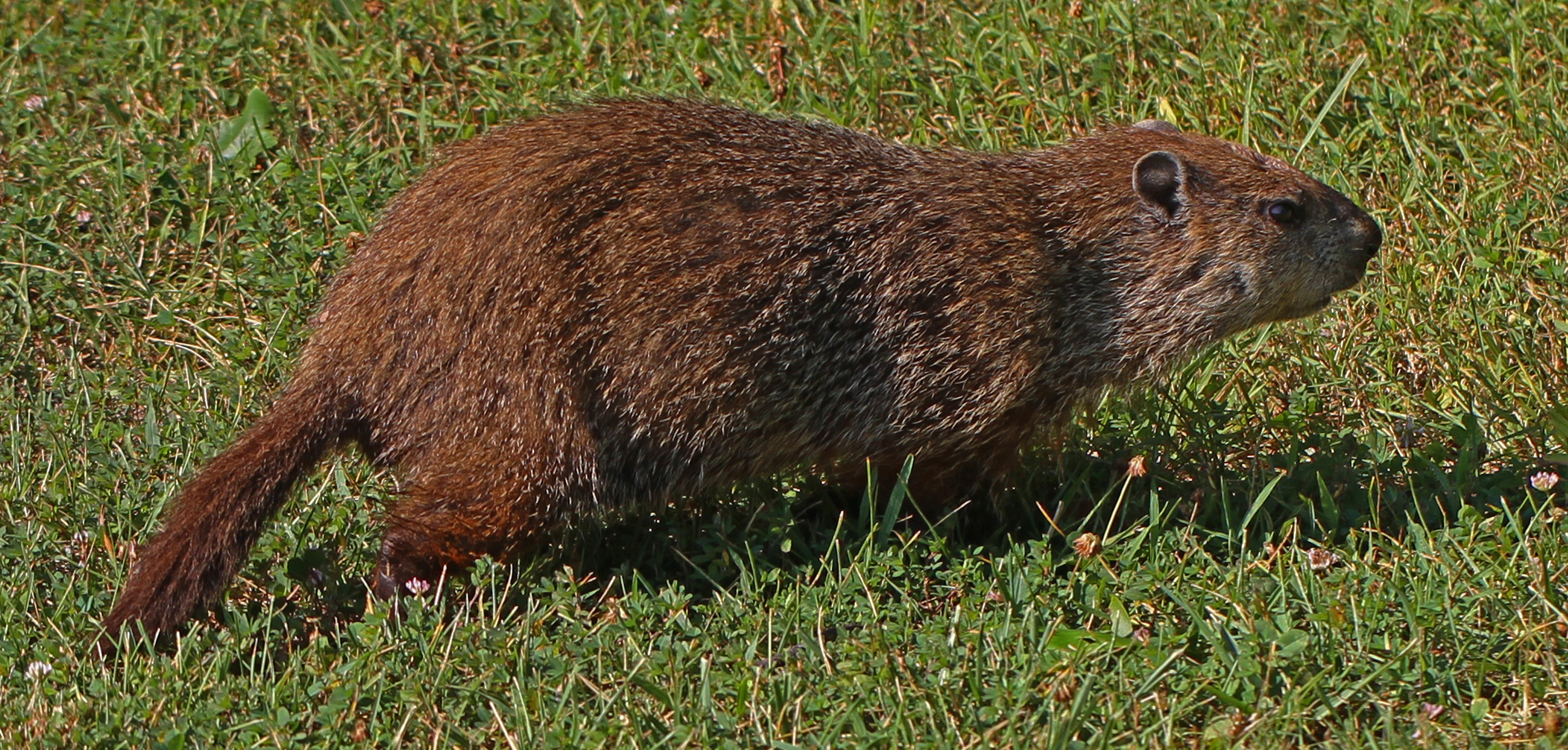
  - A living Marmota monax, or groundhog
    †Marmota monax
- †Marvacrassatella
  - †Marvacrassatella cyclopterus
  - †Marvacrassatella marylandica
  - †Marvacrassatella surryensis
  - †Marvacrassatella turgidula
  - †Marvacrassatella undulata
  - †Marvacrassatella undulatus
  - †Marvacrassatella urbannaensis
  - †Marvacrassatella urbannensis
- Massilina
- Masticophis
  - †Masticophis flagellum
- †Mclelannia
  - †Mclelannia aenigma
- Megaceryle
  - †Megaceryle alcyon
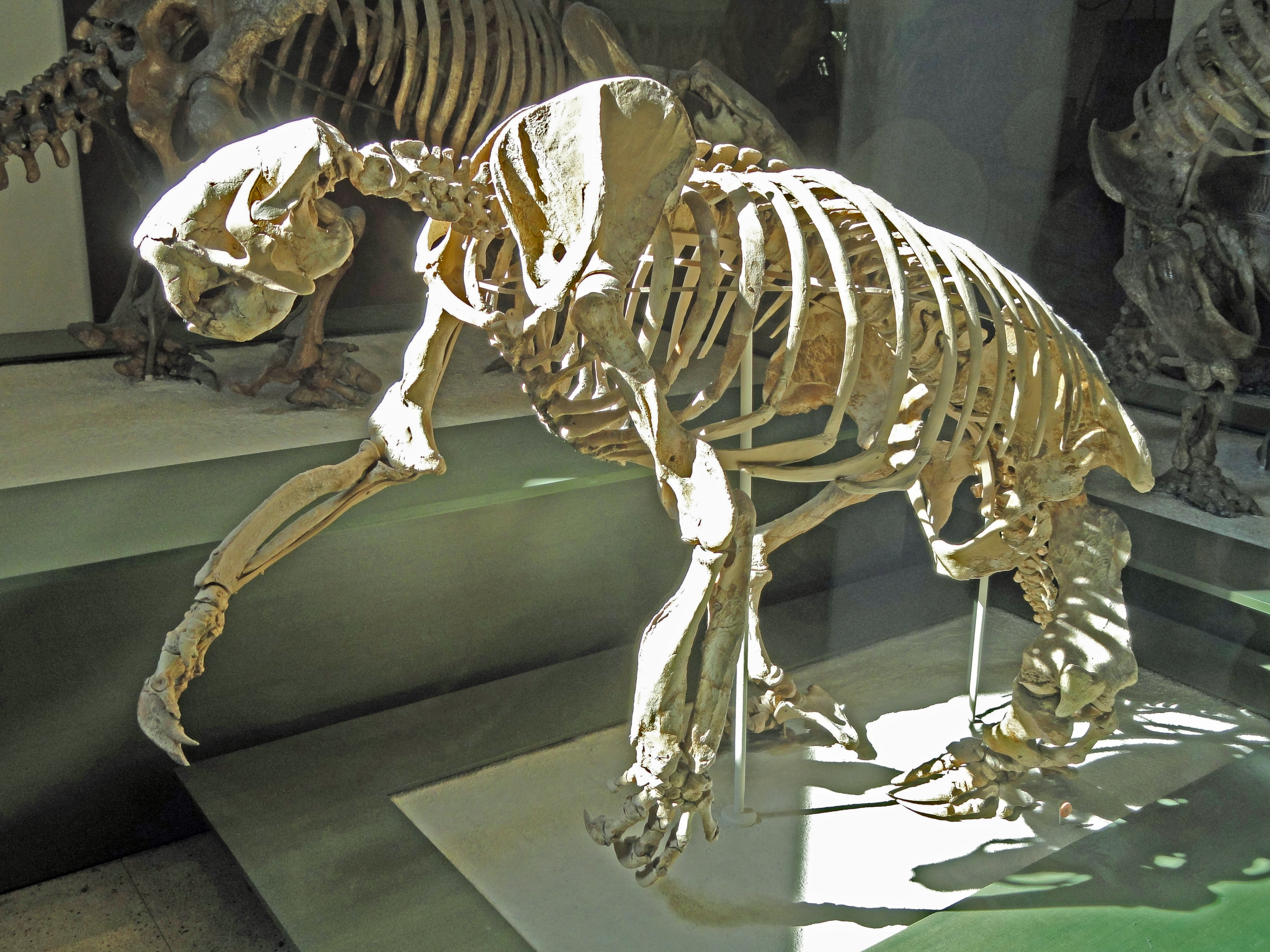
- Mounted fossilized skeleton of the Miocene-Pleistocene ground sloth Megalonyx
  †Megalonyx
  - †Megalonyx jeffersonii
- Megalops
- Megaptera
  - †Megaptera expansa
- Melanerpes
  - †Melanerpes carolinus
  - †Melanerpes erythrocephalus
- Meleagris
  - †Meleagris gallopavo
- Mellita
  - †Mellita aclinensis
  - †Mellita aclinus
- Melospiza
  - †Melospiza melodia
- Membranipora
  - †Membranipora tenuis
- Membraniporella
  - †Membraniporella petasus – or unidentified comparable form
- Mephitis
  - †Mephitis mephitis
- Mercenaria
  - †Mercenaria campechiensis
  - †Mercenaria capax
  - †Mercenaria corrugata
  - †Mercenaria cuneata
  - †Mercenaria druidi
  - †Mercenaria inflata
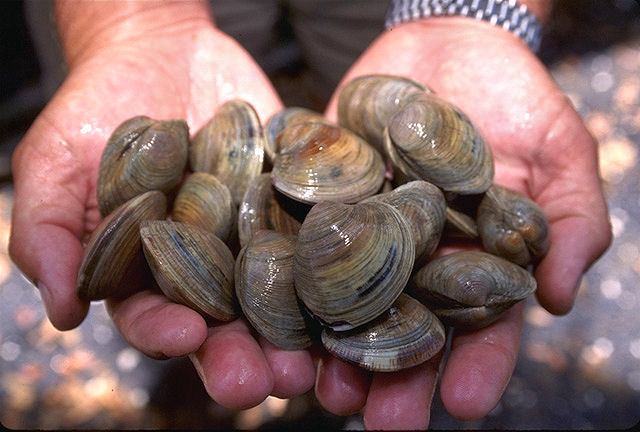
  - Collection of Mercenaria mercenaria, also known as hard clams or quahogs
    †Mercenaria mercenaria
  - †Mercenaria tetrica
- Mergus
- †Meridiania
  - †Meridiania conyexa
- †Merychippus
- †Mesocetus
  - †Mesocetus pusillus
  - †Mesocetus siphunculus – type locality for species
- Mesoplodon
  - †Mesoplodon longirostris – or unidentified comparable form
- †Mesorhytis – tentative report
  - †Mesorhytis pomonkensis
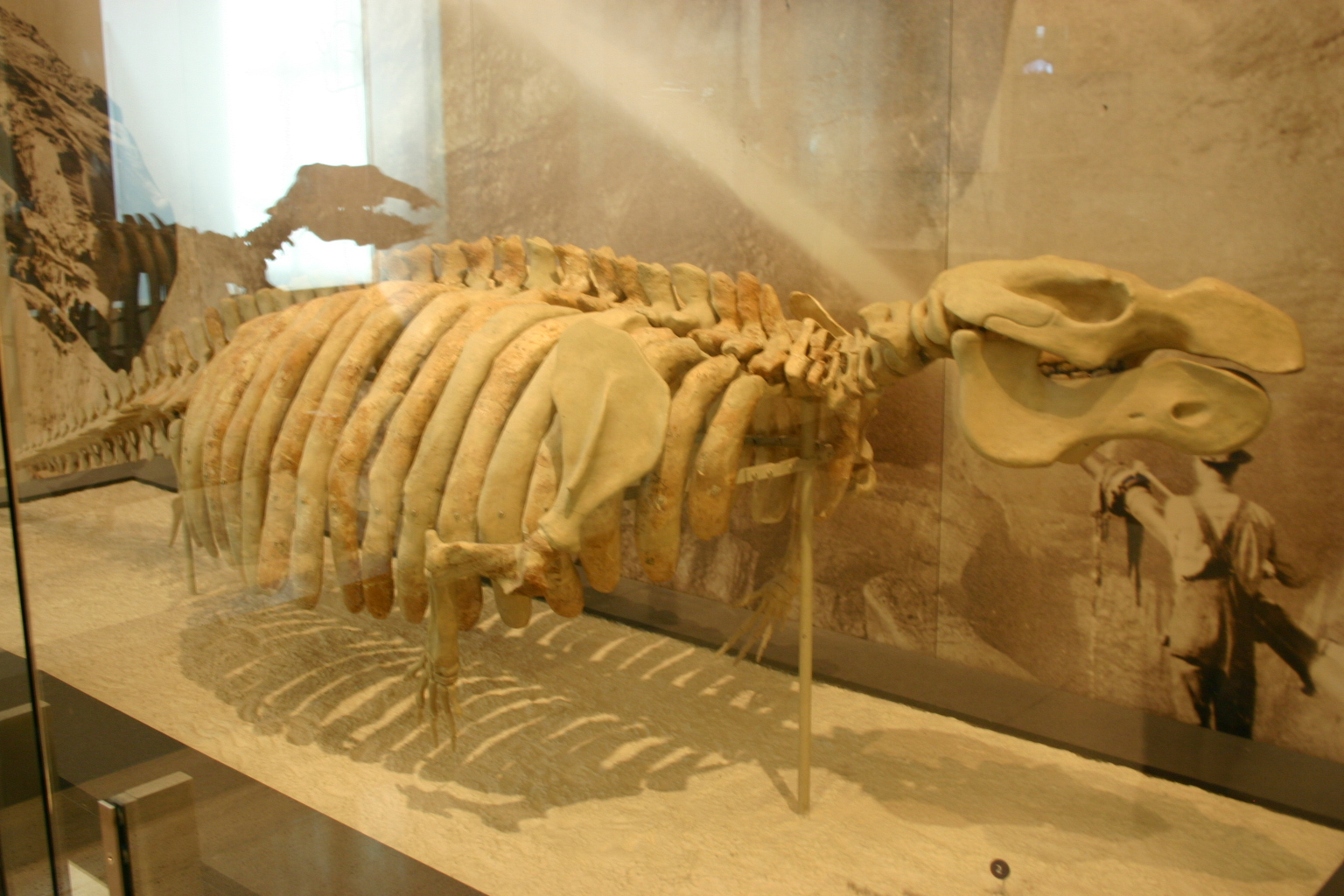
- Mounted fossilized skeleton of the Miocene-Pleistocene manatee relative Metaxytherium
  †Metaxytherium
  - †Metaxytherium crataegense
  - †Metaxytherium cratagense
- †Metopocetus – type locality for genus
  - †Metopocetus durinasus – type locality for species
- Microporella
  - †Microporella ciliata
- Microtus
  - †Microtus chrotorrhinus
  - †Microtus ochrogaster
  - †Microtus pennsylvanicus
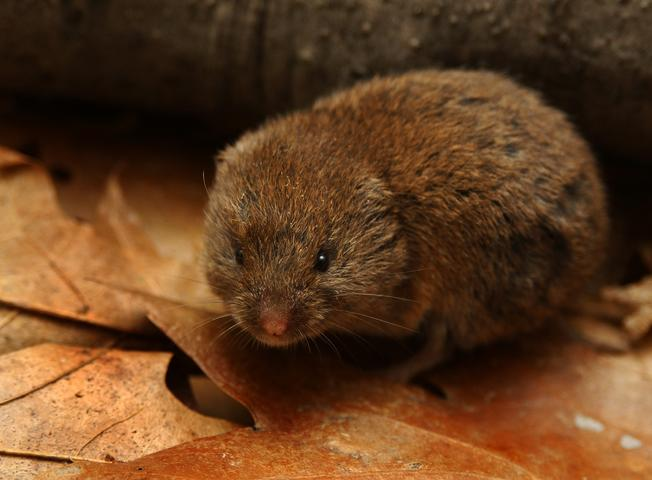
  - A living Microtus pinetorum, or woodland vole
    †Microtus pinetorum
  - †Microtus xanthognathus
  - †Microtus zanthognathus
- Mictomys
  - †Mictomys borealis
- Miltha
  - †Miltha aquiana
- †Miocepphus
  - †Miocepphus blowi – type locality for species
  - †Miocepphus bohaskai
  - †Miocepphus mcclungi
- Mitrella
  - †Mitrella communius
- Modiolus
  - †Modiolus ducateli
  - †Modiolus squamosus
- Mola
- Molothrus
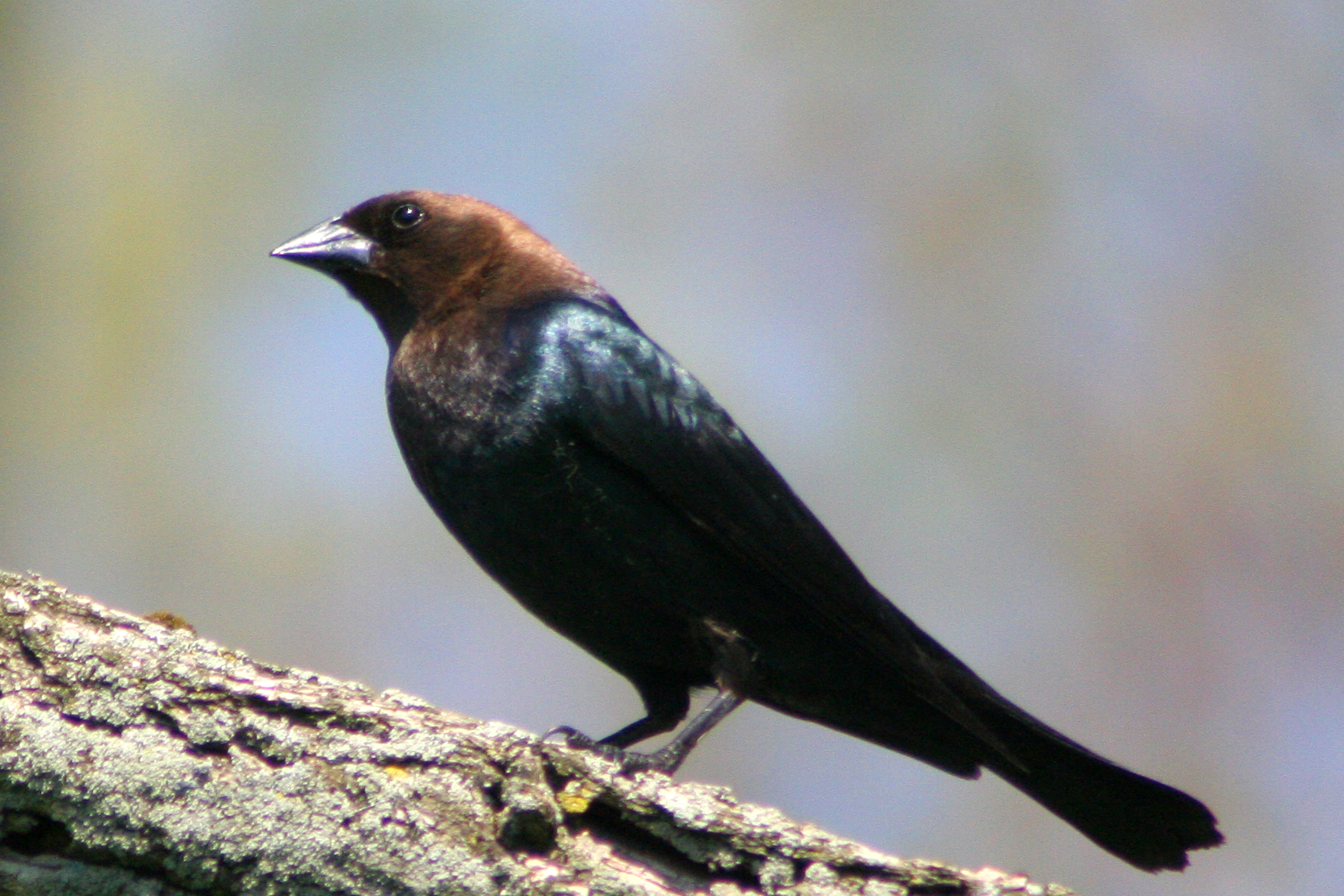
  - A living Molothrus ater, or brown-headed cowbird
    †Molothrus ater
- †Monotherium
  - †Monotherium wymani
- Morus
  - †Morus bassanus
- †Moxostoma
- Mulinia
  - †Mulinia congesta
  - †Mulinia congregata
  - †Mulinia lateralis
- †Multiporina
  - †Multiporina cornuta
- Musculus
  - †Musculus lateralis
  - †Musculus virginica
- Mustela
  - †Mustela americana
  - †Mustela nivalis
  - †Mustela richardsonii
- †Mya
  - †Mya arenaria
  - †Mya wilsoni – tentative report
- Myliobatis
  - †Myliobatis dixoni
  - †Myliobatis latidens
  - †Myliobatis striatus
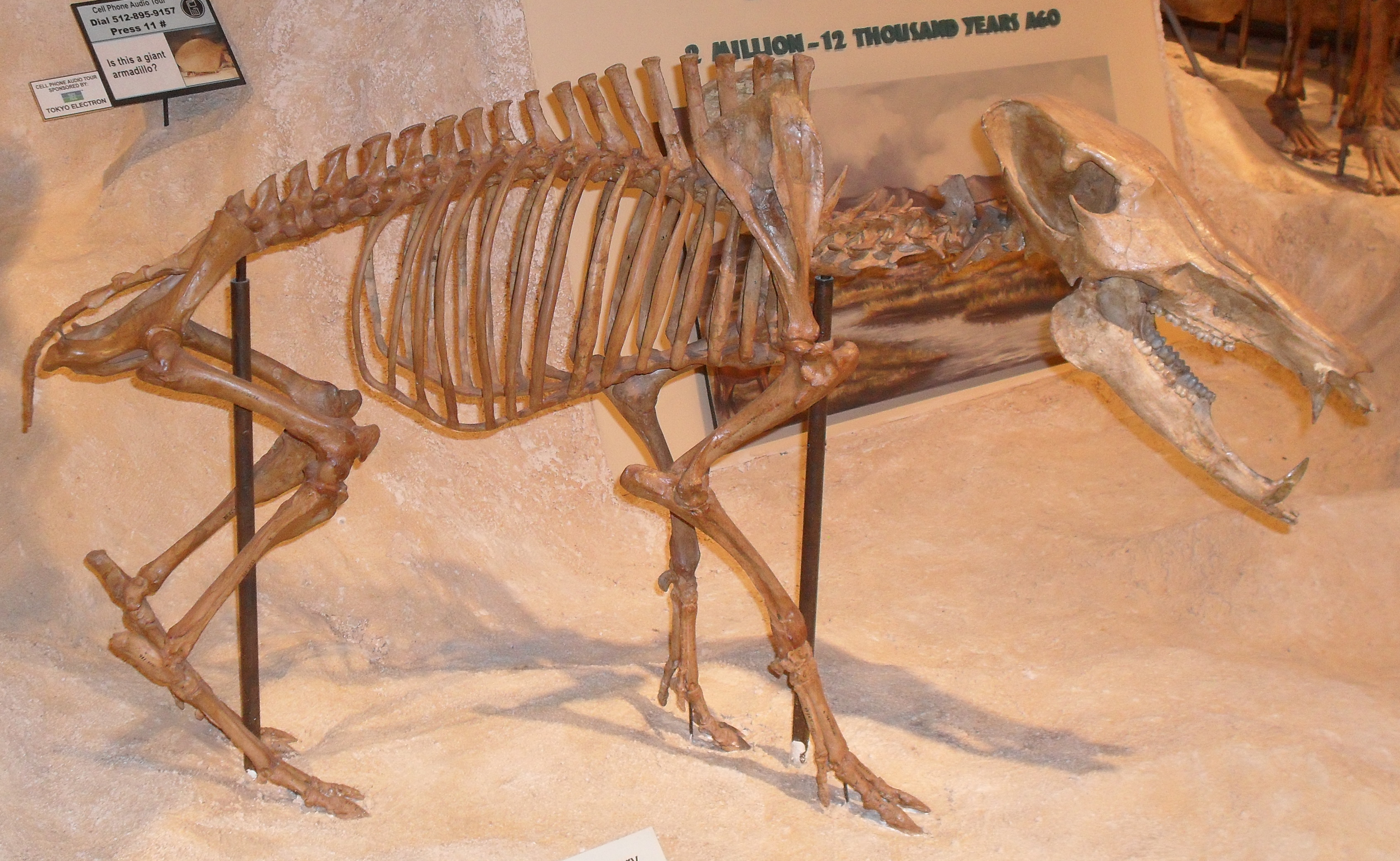
- Fossilized skeleton of the Pliocene-Holocene peccary Mylohyus
  †Mylohyus
  - †Mylohyus fossilis
- Myochama
- Myotis
  - †Myotis grisescens
  - †Myotis keenii
  - †Myotis lucifugus
- Myriophyllum
- Myrtea – tentative report
  - †Myrtea curta – or unidentified comparable form
  - †Myrtea uhleri
- Mytilus
  - †Mytilus edulis

== N ==
- †Nannaria
- †Nanogyra
  - †Nanogyra virgula
- Napaeozapus
  - †Napaeozapus insignis
- †Napeozapus
  - †Napeozapus insignis
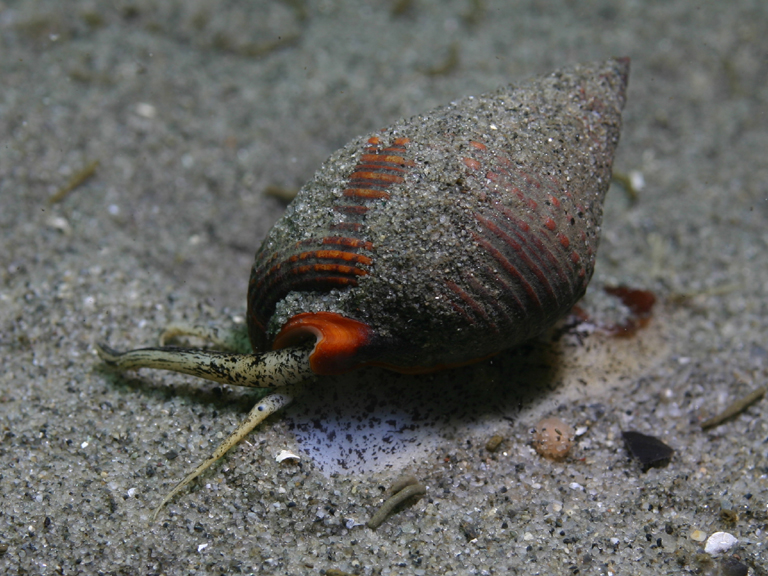
- A living Nassarius, or nassa mud snail
  Nassarius
  - †Nassarius marylandica
  - †Nassarius peralta
- Naticarius
- Natrix
- Nebrius
  - †Nebrius thielensis
- Negaprion
- Nemocardium
- Neofiber
  - †Neofiber leonardi
- †Neopanope
  - †Neopanope texana
- Neogale
  - †Neogale frenata
  - †Neogale vison
- Neotoma
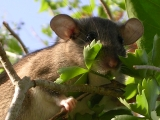
  - Close-up of a Neotoma floridana, or eastern woodrat
    †Neotoma floridana
- Nerodia
  - †Nerodia sipedon
- Neverita
  - †Neverita duplicatus
- †Ninoziphius
  - †Ninoziphius platyrostris – or unidentified comparable form
- †Nipa – or unidentified comparable form
  - †Nipa burtini
- Niso
- †Nocomis
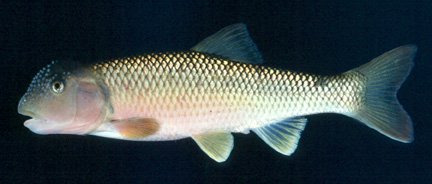
  - A living Nocomis raneyi, or bull chub
    †Nocomis raneyi – or unidentified comparable form
- Noetia
  - †Noetia incile
- Nonion
- Nonionella
  - †Nonionella atlantica
- Notidanus
  - †Notidanus primigenius
- Notophthalmus
  - †Notophthalmus viridescens – or unidentified comparable form
- Notorhynchus
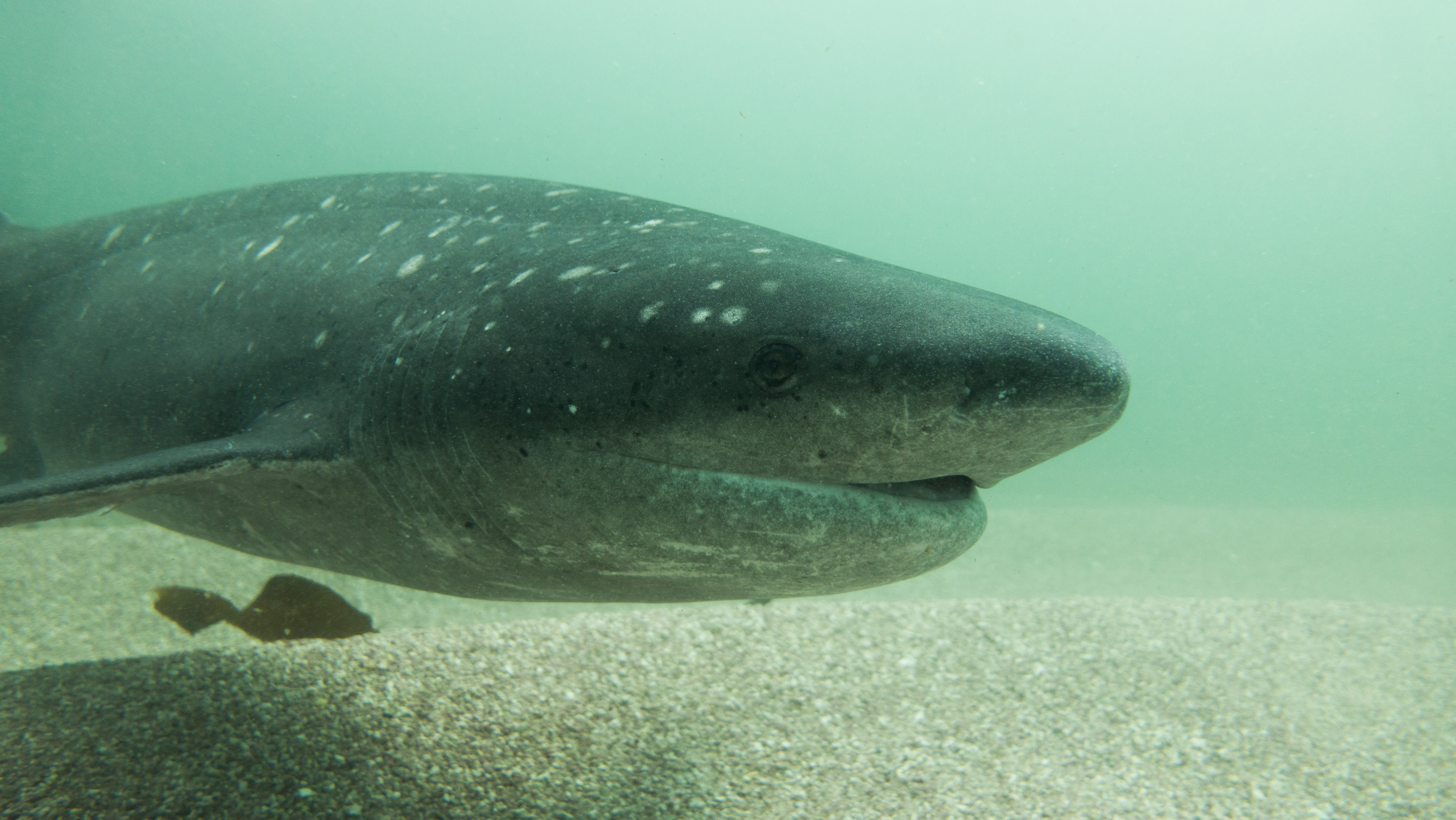
- Close-up portrait of a living Notorynchus cepedianus, or broadnose sevengill shark
  Notorynchus
  - †Notorynchus cepidianus
- †Noturus
- Nucula
  - †Nucula ovula
  - †Nucula proxima
  - †Nucula taphria
- Nuculana
  - †Nuculana acuta
  - †Nuculana cliftonensis
  - †Nuculana coelatella
  - †Nuculana cultelliformis
  - †Nuculana improcera
- †Nyssa
  - †Nyssa sylavtica

== O ==
- Ochotona
- Ocypode
- Odobenus
  - †Odobenus rosmarus
- Odocoileus
  - †Odocoileus virginianus
- Odontaspis
  - †Odontaspis macrota
  - †Odontaspis winkleri
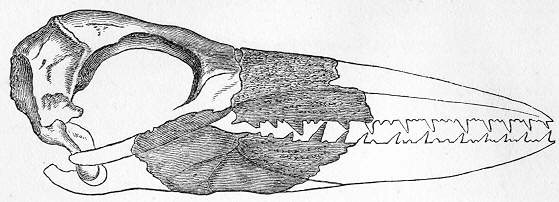
- Illustration of a fossilized partial skull of the Paleocene-Eocene pseudo-toothed bird Odontopteryx
  †Odontopteryx – tentative report
- Odostomia
- Oliva
  - †Oliva canaliculata
  - †Oliva carolinae
  - †Oliva sayana
- Olivella
  - †Olivella mutica
- Ondatra
  - †Ondatra zibethicus
- Onthophagus
  - †Onthophagus janus – or unidentified comparable form
- †Ontocetus – type locality for genus
  - †Ontocetus emmonsi – type locality for species
- †Operculodinium
- Opheodrys
- †Opsanus
- Orthoyoldia
  - †Orthoyoldia psammotaea
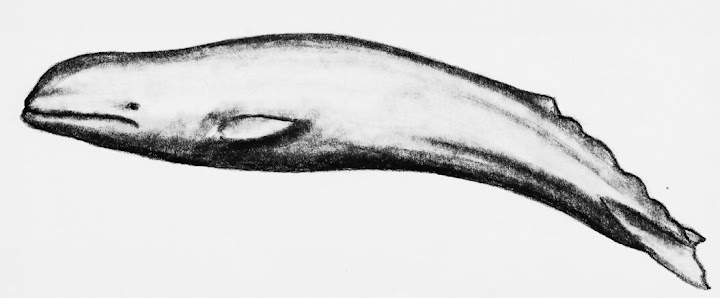
- Life restoration of the Miocene sperm whale Orycterocetus
  †Orycterocetus
  - †Orycterocetus crocodilinus – type locality for species
- †Osteopygis
  - †Osteopygis roundsi – type locality for species
- †Ostracion
  - †Ostracion meretrix
- Ostrea
  - †Ostrea alepidota
  - †Ostrea compressirostra
  - †Ostrea raveneliana
  - †Ostrea sinuosa
- †Otodus
  - Diagram illustrating the largest (grey) and most conservative (red) size estimates of the Miocene-Pliocene shark Carcharocles megalodon (sometimes Carcharodon or Otodus megalodon) with a whale shark (violet), great white shark (green), and anachronistic human (black) to scale
    †Otodus megalodon
- Otus
  - †Otus asio
- †Oxyrhina
  - †Oxyrhina retroflexa
- †Oxyura
  - †Oxyura jamaicensis

== P ==
- †Pachecoa
  - †Pachecoa decisa – or unidentified comparable form
  - †Pachecoa ellipsis
- †Pachygaleus
  - †Pachygaleus lefevrei
- †Palaeocystodinium
  - †Palaeocystodinium golzowense
- †Palaeogaleus
  - †Palaeogaleus vincenti
- †Palaeohypotodus
  - †Palaeohypotodus ratoti
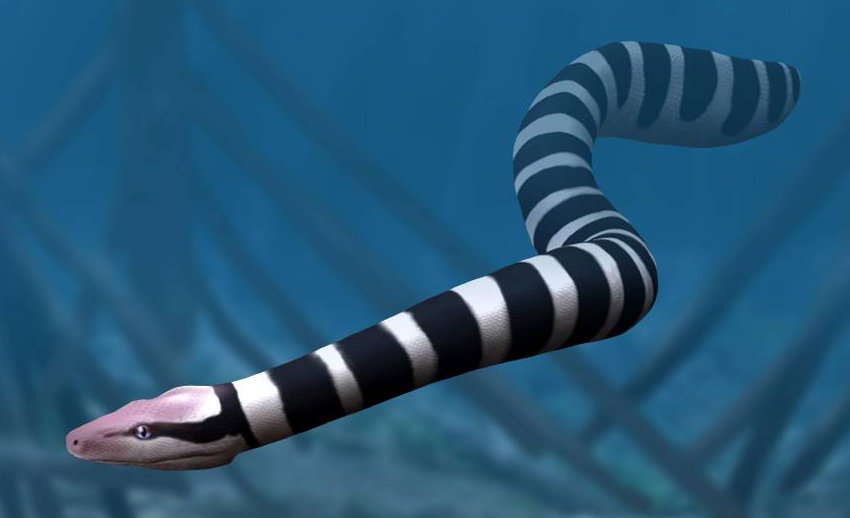
- Restoration of the Cretaceous-Eocene sea snake Palaeophis
  †Palaeophis
  - †Palaeophis casei
  - †Palaeophis grandis
  - †Palaeophis toliapicus
  - †Palaeophis virginianus – type locality for species
- †Palaeorhincodon
  - †Palaeorhincodon wardi
- †Palaeosinopa – or unidentified comparable form
- Pandora
  - †Pandora arenosa
  - †Pandora gouldiana
  - †Pandora trilineata
- Panopea
  - †Panopea elongata
  - †Panopea goldfussi
  - †Panopea goldfussii
  - †Panopea reflexa
- Panopeus
  - †Panopeus herbstii
- Panthera
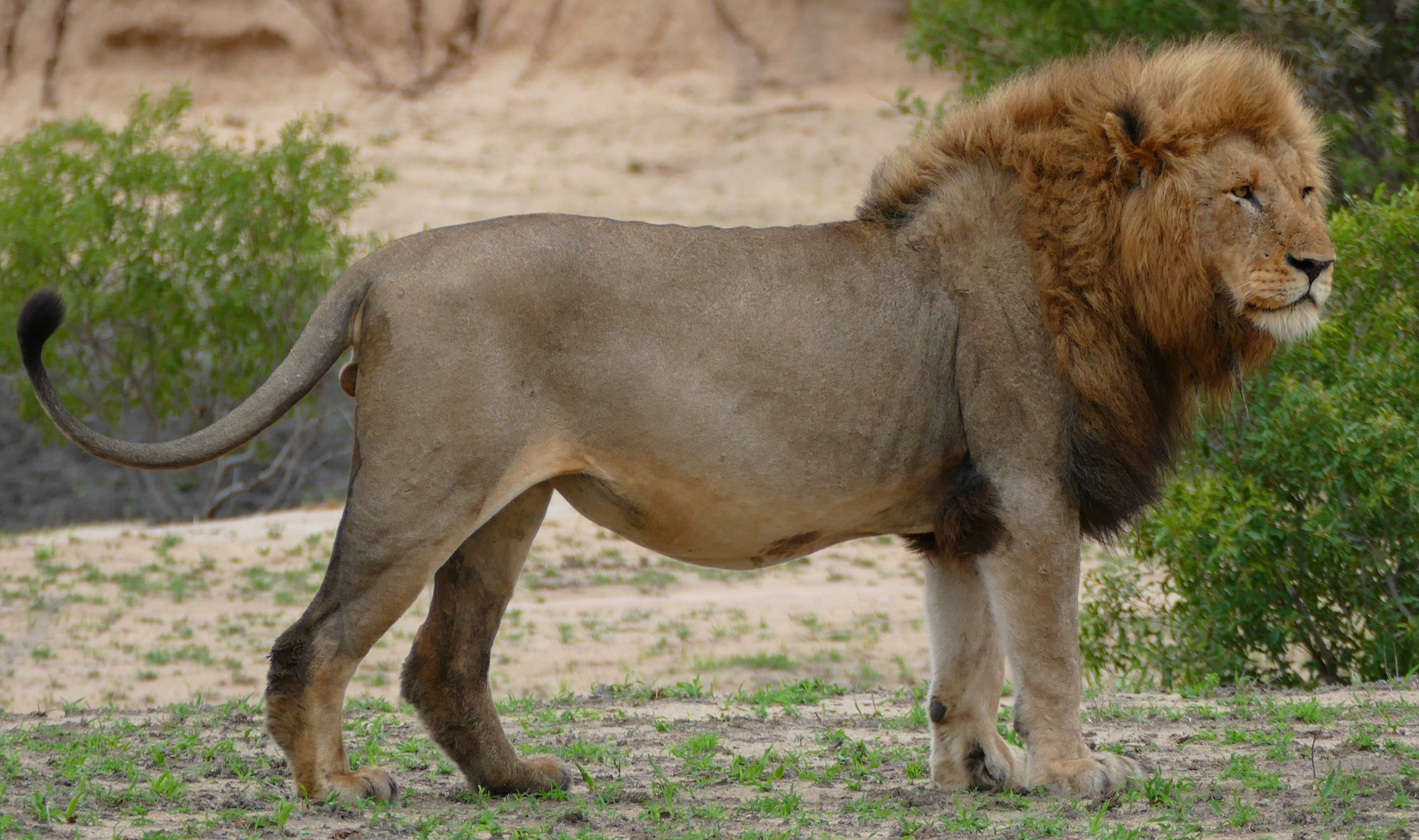
  - A living Panthera leo, or lion
    †Panthera leo
- Paraconcavus
  - †Paraconcavus neusensis
  - †Paraconcavus prebrevicalcar
- †Paralbula
  - †Paralbula marylandica
- †Paramya
  - †Paramya subovata
- Parascalops
  - †Parascalops breweri
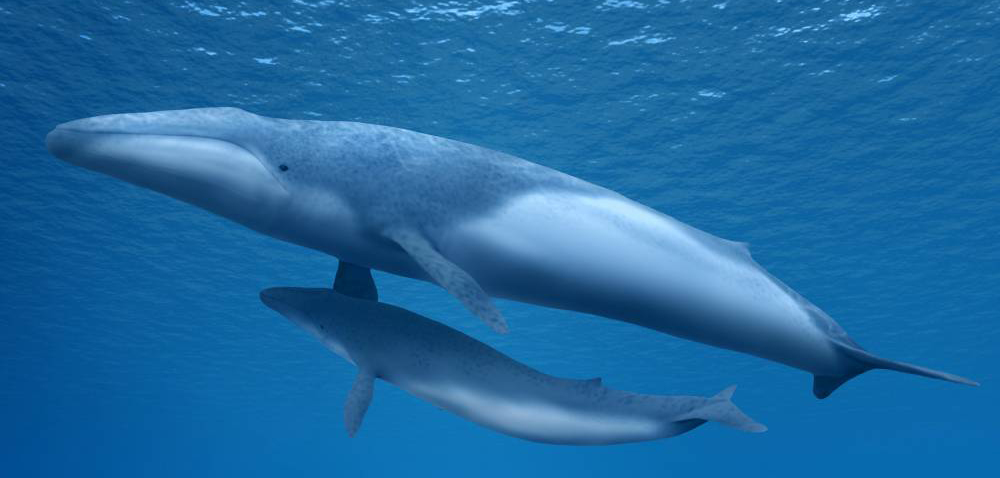
- Life restoration of the Miocene baleen whale Parietobalaena and calf
  †Parietobalaena
  - †Parietobalaena palmeri
- †Parophisaurus
  - †Parophisaurus mccloskeyi – type locality for species
- Parus
  - †Parus bicolor
- Parvanachis
  - †Parvanachis obesa
- Parvilucina
  - †Parvilucina crenulata
  - †Parvilucina multilineatus
  - †Parvilucina multistriata
- Passerella
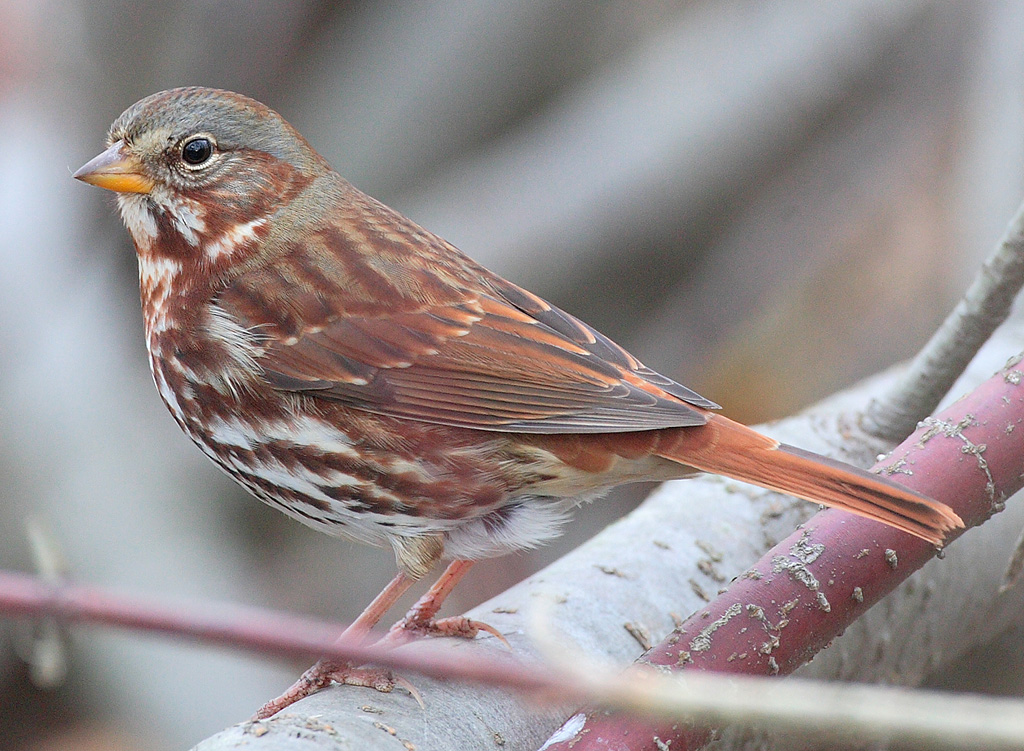
  - A living Passerella iliaca, or fox sparrow
    †Passerella iliaca
- Pecten
  - †Pecten humphreysii
  - †Pecten marylandica
  - †Pecten perplanus
  - †Pecten seabeensis
- †Pedalion
  - †Pedalion maxillatum
- Pedioecetes
  - †Pedioecetes phasianellus
- Pekania
  - †Pekania pennanti – or unidentified comparable form
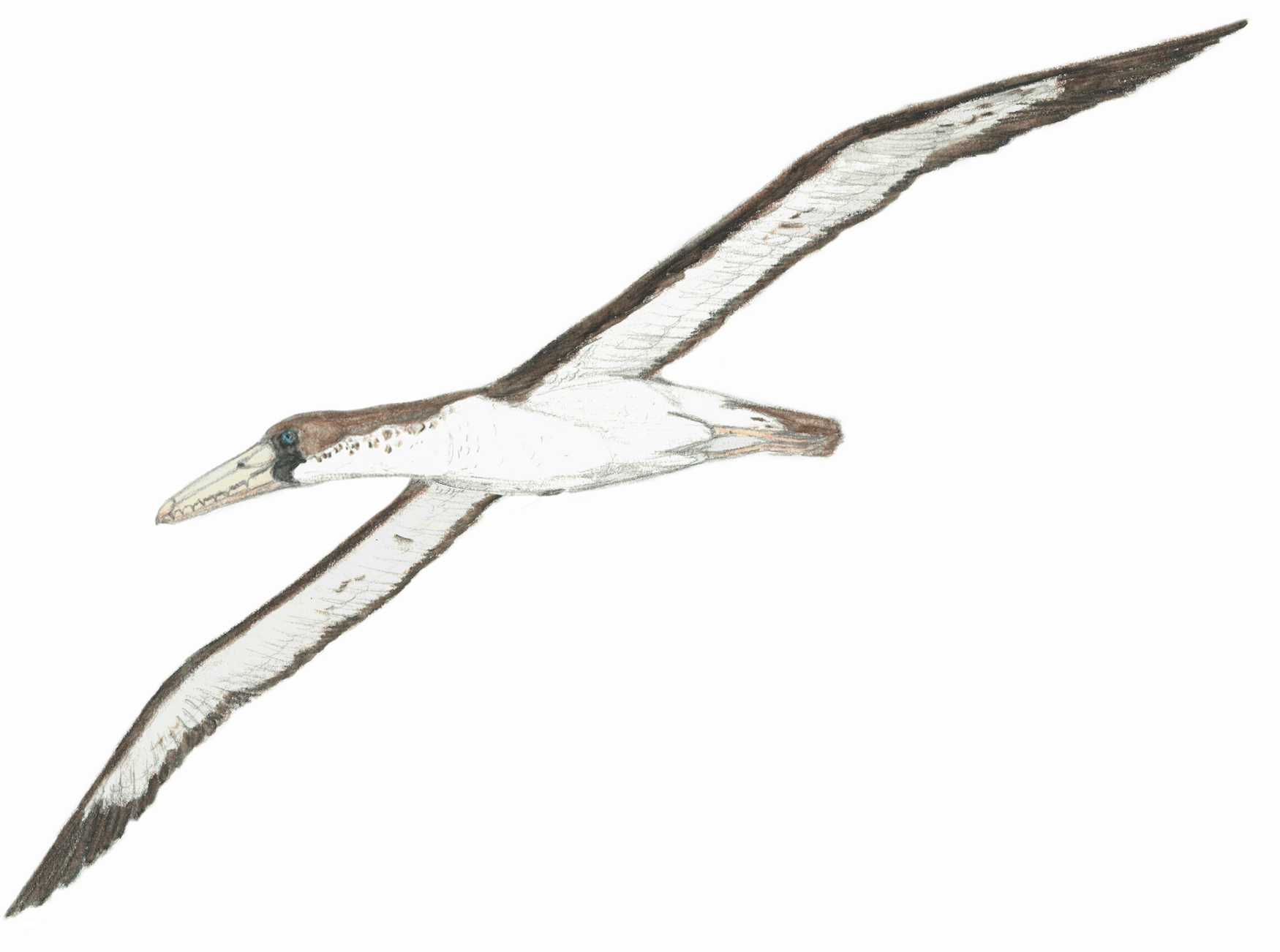
- Life restoration of the Oligocene-Pleistocene false-toothed bird Pelagornis
  †Pelagornis
- †Pelocetus
  - †Pelocetus calvertensis
- †Pentadinium
  - †Pentadinium goniferum
  - †Pentadinium laticinctum
- †Peradectes
  - †Peradectes guottai – type locality for species
- †Perimyotis
  - †Perimyotis subflavus
- Periploma
  - †Periploma leanum
- Perisoreus
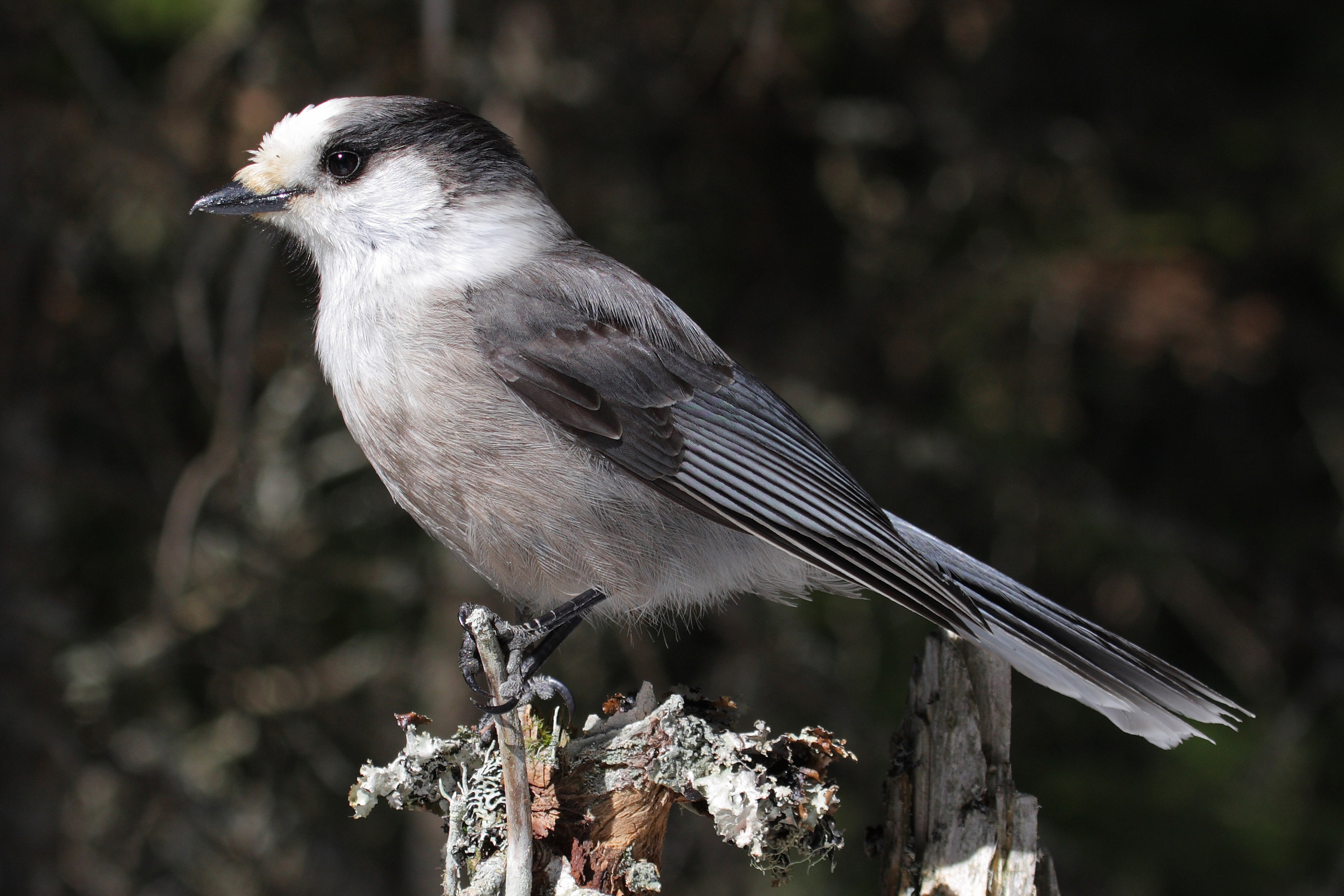
  - A living Perisoreus canadensis, or grey jay
    †Perisoreus canadensis
- †Perisorus
  - †Perisorus canadensis
- Peristernia
  - †Peristernia filicata
- Peromyscus
  - †Peromyscus leucopus
  - †Peromyscus maniculatus
- Petaloconchus
  - †Petaloconchus graniferus
  - †Petaloconchus virginica
- †Petriathyris
- Petricola
  - †Petricola pholadiformis
- Petrochelidon
  - †Petrochelidon pyrrhonota
- †Petrocheliodon
  - †Petrocheliodon pyrrhonota
- †Phalacrocoras
  - †Phalacrocoras auritus
- Phalacrocorax
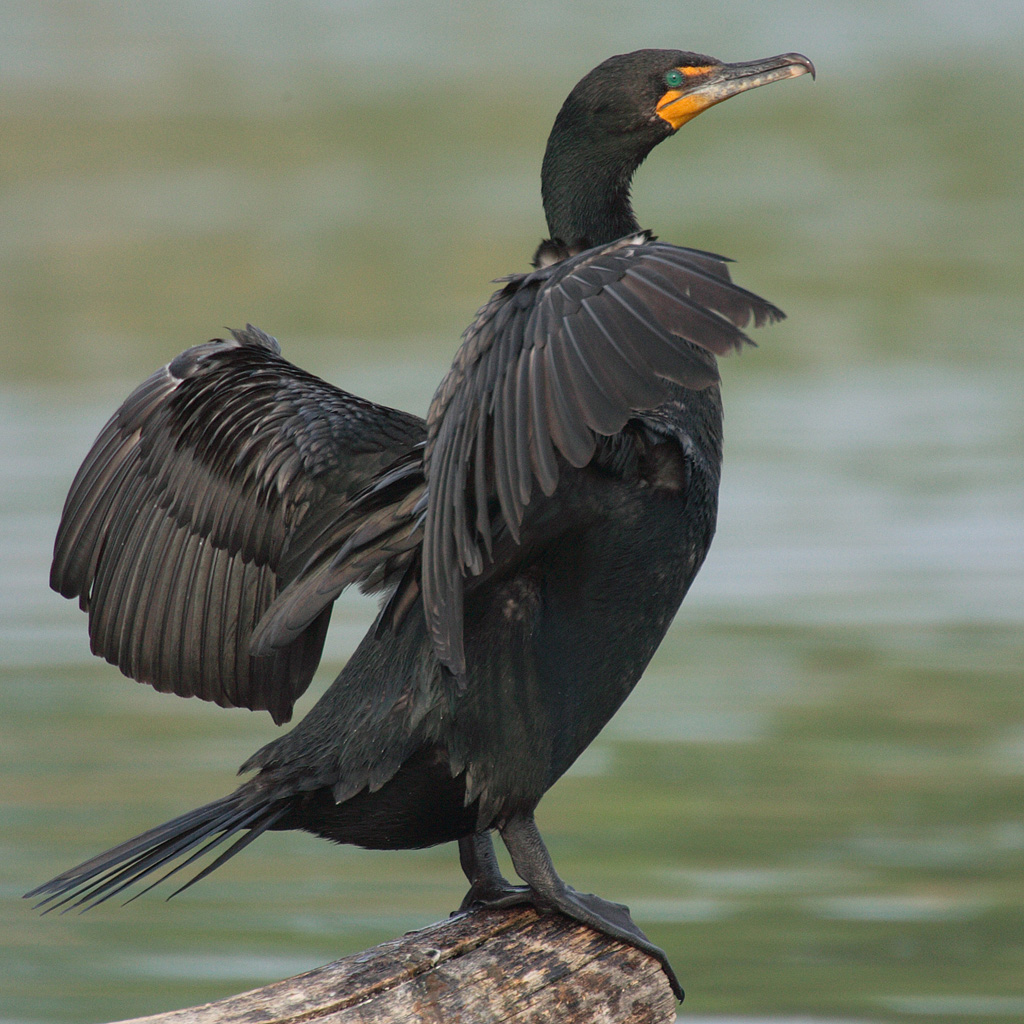
  - A living Phalacrocorax auritus, or double-crested cormorant
    †Phalacrocorax auritus
- †Phenacomya
  - †Phenacomya petrosa
- Phenacomys
  - †Phenacomys intermedius
  - †Phenacomys ungava – or unidentified comparable form
- †Phocageneus – type locality for genus
  - †Phocageneus venustus – type locality for species
- Pholadomya
  - †Pholadomya marylandica
- Pholas
  - †Pholas petrosa – tentative report
- Phyllodus
  - †Phyllodus toliapicus
- Physa
  - †Physa heterostropha
- †Physogaleus
  - †Physogaleus contortus
  - †Physogaleus secundas
- †Phytolacca
  - †Phytolacca decandra
- Pica
  - †Pica pica
- Picea
- †Pinguinus
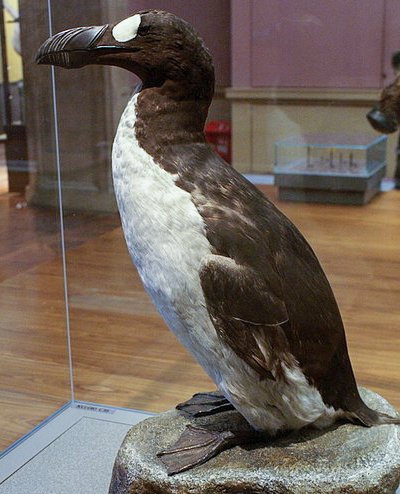
  - Taxidermied specimen of Pinguinus impennis, or the great auk
    †Pinguinus impennis
- Pinicola – or unidentified comparable form
  - †Pinicola enucleator
- †Pinquinus
  - †Pinquinus impennis
- Pinus
- †Pipestrellus
  - †Pipestrellus subflavus
- Pipistrellus
  - †Pipistrellus subflavus
- Piranga
- Pisania
  - †Pisania nux
- Pisidium
  - †Pisidium dubium
- †Pisodus
  - †Pisodus oweni
- Pitar
  - †Pitar eversus
  - †Pitar morrhuanus
  - †Pitar ovatus
  - †Pitar pyga
- Placopecten
  - †Placopecten clintonius
  - †Placopecten princepoides
- †Plagiarca
  - †Plagiarca rhomboidella
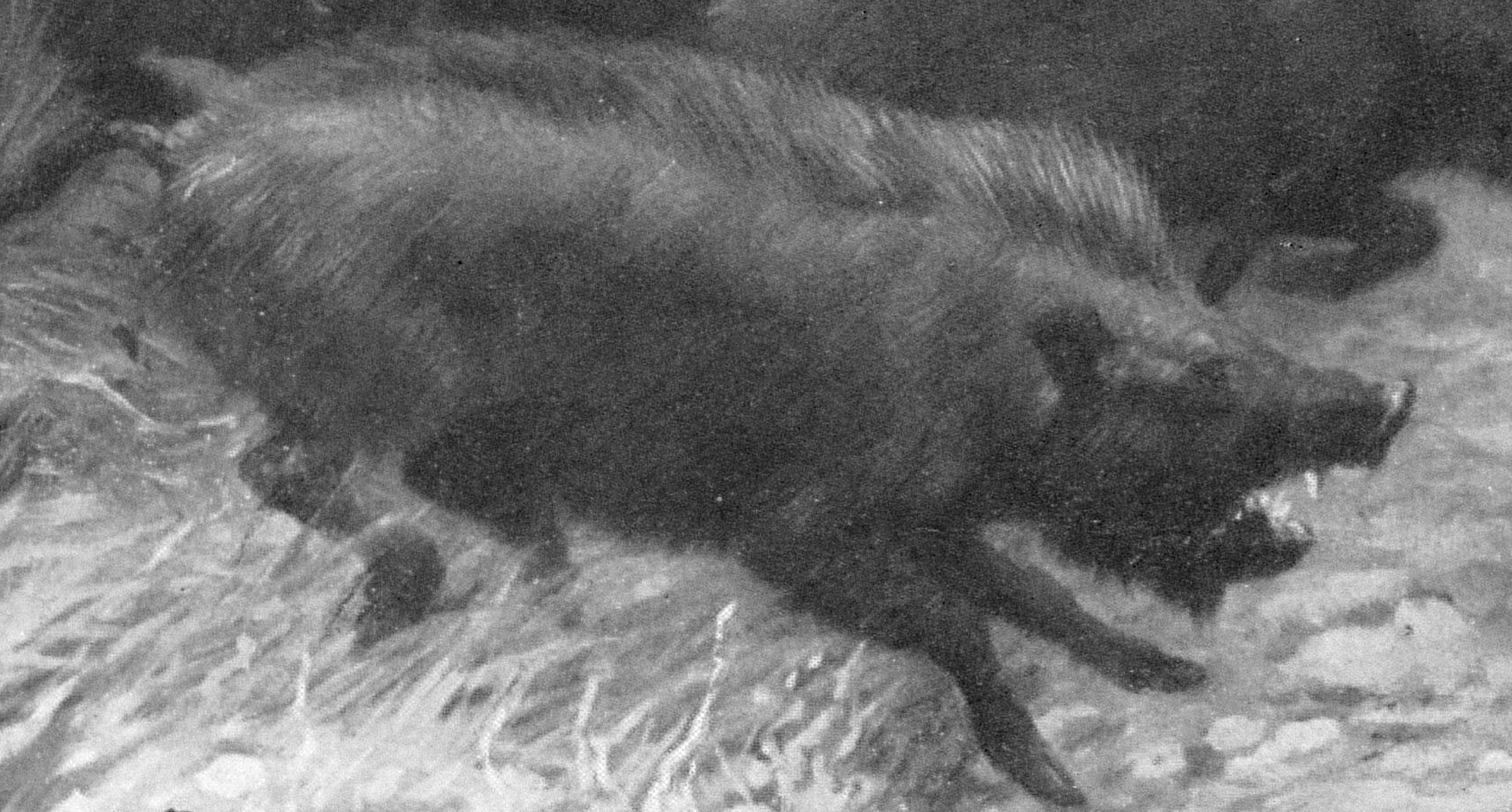
- Restoration of a herd of alarmed Miocene-Pleistocene peccaries of the genus Platygonus. Charles R. Knight (1922).
  †Platygonus
  - †Platygonus compressus
  - †Platygonus vetus
- Plecotus
  - †Plecotus townsendii – or unidentified comparable form
- †Pleiorytis
  - †Pleiorytis centenaria
- Pleuromeris
  - †Pleuromeris tridentata
- Plicatula
  - †Plicatula filamentosa
  - †Plicatula gibbosa
- Pluvialis
  - †Pluvialis dominica
- Podiceps
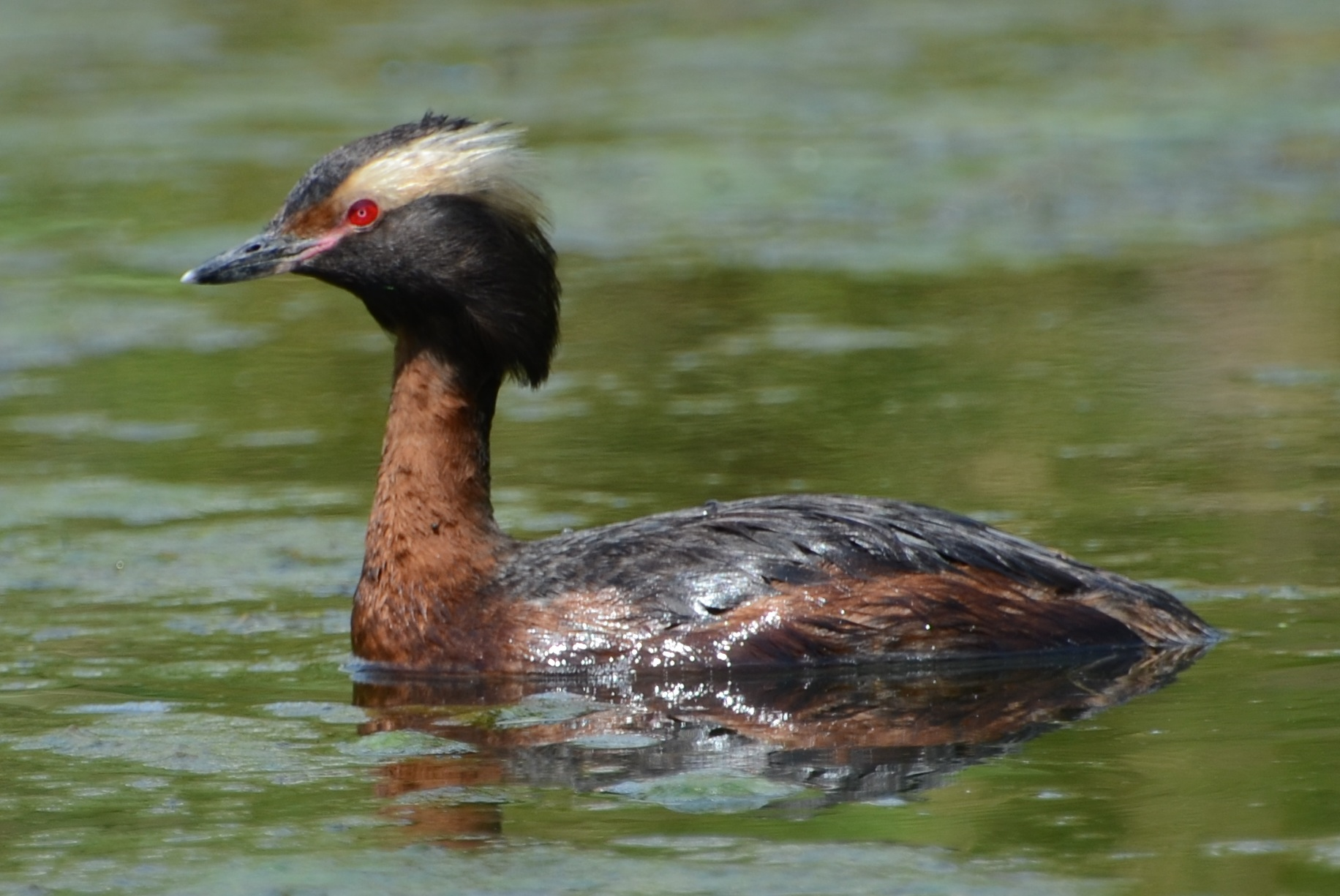
  - A living Podiceps auritus, or horned grebe
    †Podiceps auritus
- Podilymbus
  - †Podilymbus podiceps
- Pogonias
  - †Pogonias multidentatus – type locality for species
- Polinices
  - †Polinices aratus
- Polydora
- Polygonum
- †Pomatiopsis
  - †Pomatiopsis lapidaria
- †Pooecetes
  - †Pooecetes gramineus
- Poroeponides
  - †Poroeponides lateralis
  - †Poroeponides repanda – or unidentified comparable form
- Porzana
  - †Porzana carolina
- †Potamogeton
- †Premontria
  - †Premontria degremonti
- †Prionodon
  - †Prionodon egertoni
- Prionotus
- †Priscoficus
  - †Priscoficus arguta
- Pristis
  - †Pristis brachyodon – type locality for species
  - †Pristis luthami
- †Procamelus – or unidentified comparable form
- †Procolpochelys
  - †Procolpochelys charlestonensis
  - †Procolpochelys grandaeva
- Procyon
  - †Procyon lotor
- †Prolates
  - †Prolates dormaalensis
- †Pronum
  - †Pronum roscidum
- †Propristis
  - †Propristis schweinfurthi
- †Prosthennops – report made of unidentified related form or using admittedly obsolete nomenclature
  - †Prosthennops xiphidonticus
- †Protautoga
  - †Protautoga conidens
- †Protelphidium
  - †Protelphidium tisburyense
- Prunum
  - †Prunum limatulum
  - †Prunum roscidum
- Psammechinus
  - †Psammechinus philanthopus
  - †Psammechinus philanthropus
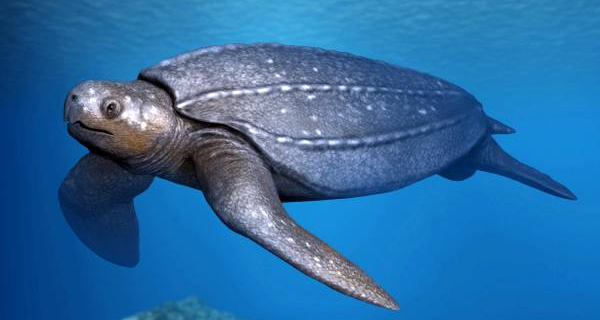
- Hypothetical restoration of the Oligocene-Pliocene sea turtle Psephophorus
  †Psephophorus
- Pseudochama
  - †Pseudochama corticosa
  - †Pseudochama corticosta
- Pseudoliva
  - †Pseudoliva santander
  - †Pseudoliva vetusta
- Pseudopolymorphina
  - †Pseudopolymorphina novangliae – or unidentified comparable form
- Pseudotorinia
  - †Pseudotorinia nupera
  - †Pseudotorinia nuperum
- Pteria
  - †Pteria colymbus
  - †Pteria limula – tentative report
- Pteromeris
  - †Pteromeris tridentata
- Pteromylaeus
- †Ptychosalpinx
  - †Ptychosalpinx fossulata
  - †Ptychosalpinx laqueata
  - †Ptychosalpinx multirugata
  - †Ptychosalpinx tuomeyi
- Pulvinites
  - †Pulvinites lawrencei
- †Puppigerus
  - †Puppigerus camperi
- Pycnodonte
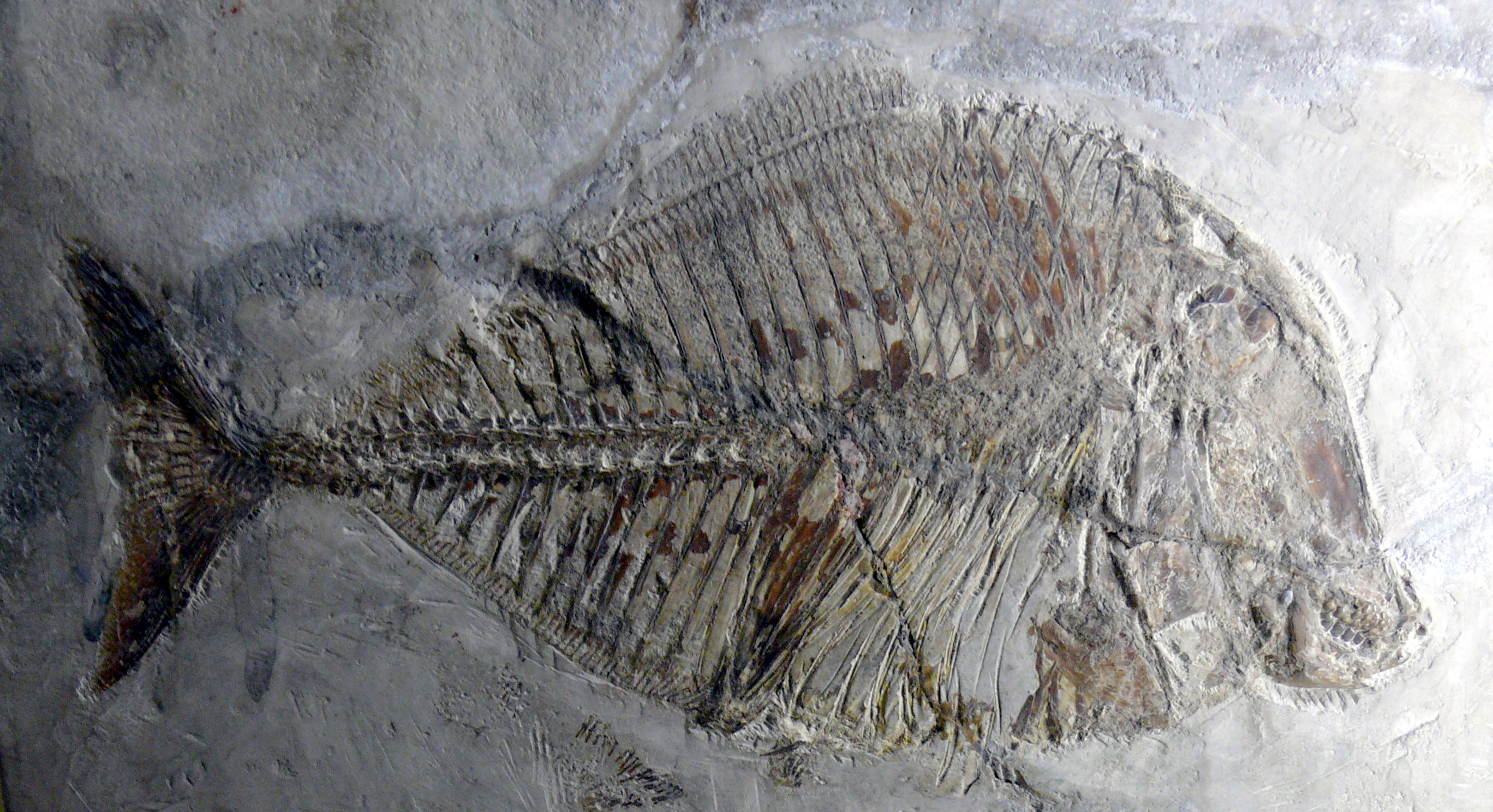
- Fossilized skeleton of the Late Cretaceous-Eocene bony fish Pycnodus
  Pycnodus
- †Pyropsis

== Q ==
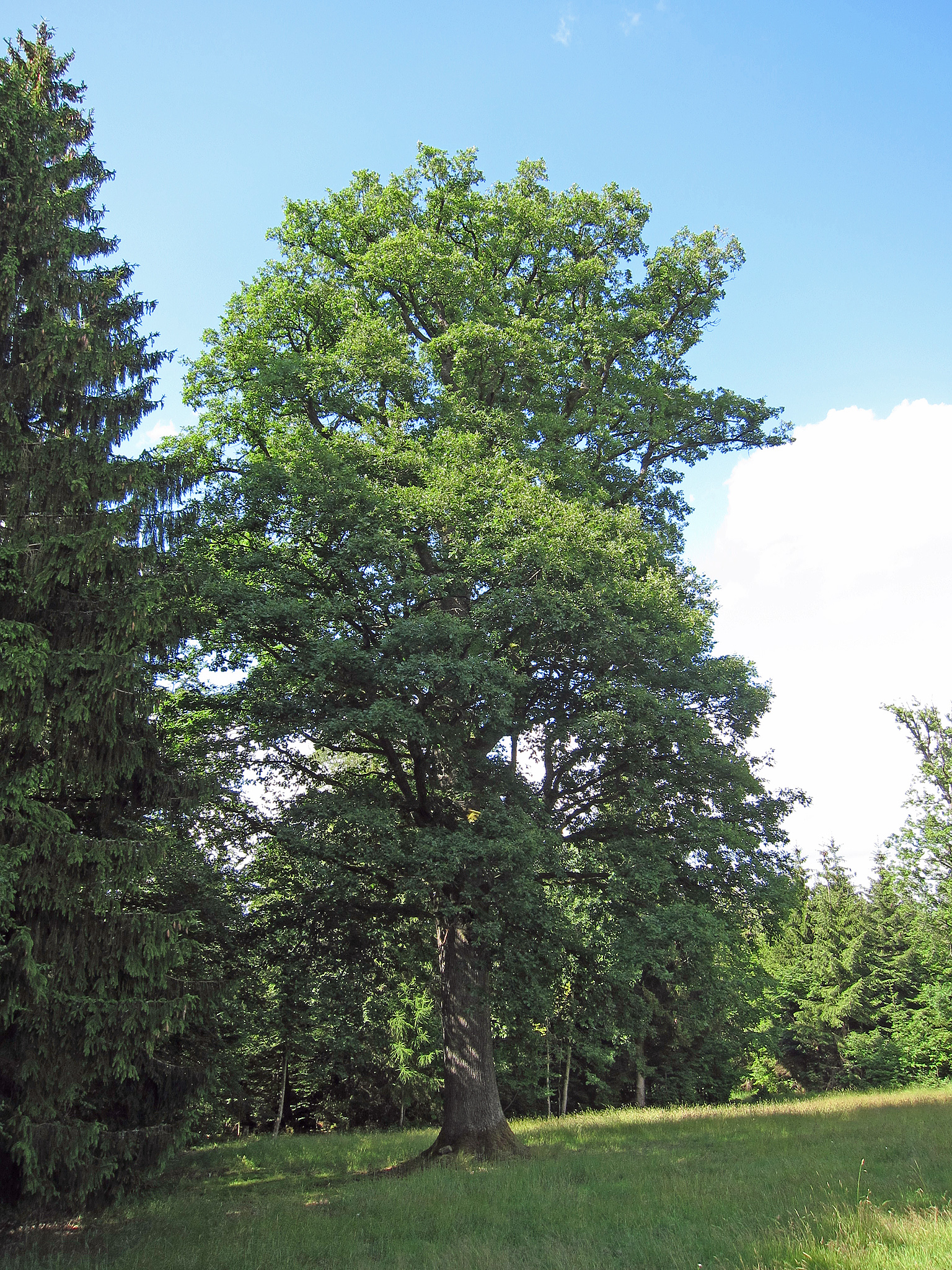
- A living Quercus, or oak tree
  Quercus
- Quinqueloculina
  - †Quinqueloculina compta
  - †Quinqueloculina jugosa
  - †Quinqueloculina lamarckiana
  - †Quinqueloculina lamarkiana
  - †Quinqueloculina microcosta
  - †Quinqueloculina peyana
  - †Quinqueloculina poeyana
  - †Quinqueloculina seminula

== R ==
- Raeta
  - †Raeta plicatella
- Raja
- Rallus
  - †Rallus limicola
- †Rana
  - †Rana catesbiana – lapsus calami of Rana catesbeiana
  - †Rana clamitans – or unidentified comparable form
  - †Rana palustris
  - †Rana pipiens
  - †Rana sylvatica – or unidentified comparable form
- Rangia
  - †Rangia clathrodon
  - †Rangia cuneata
- Rangifer
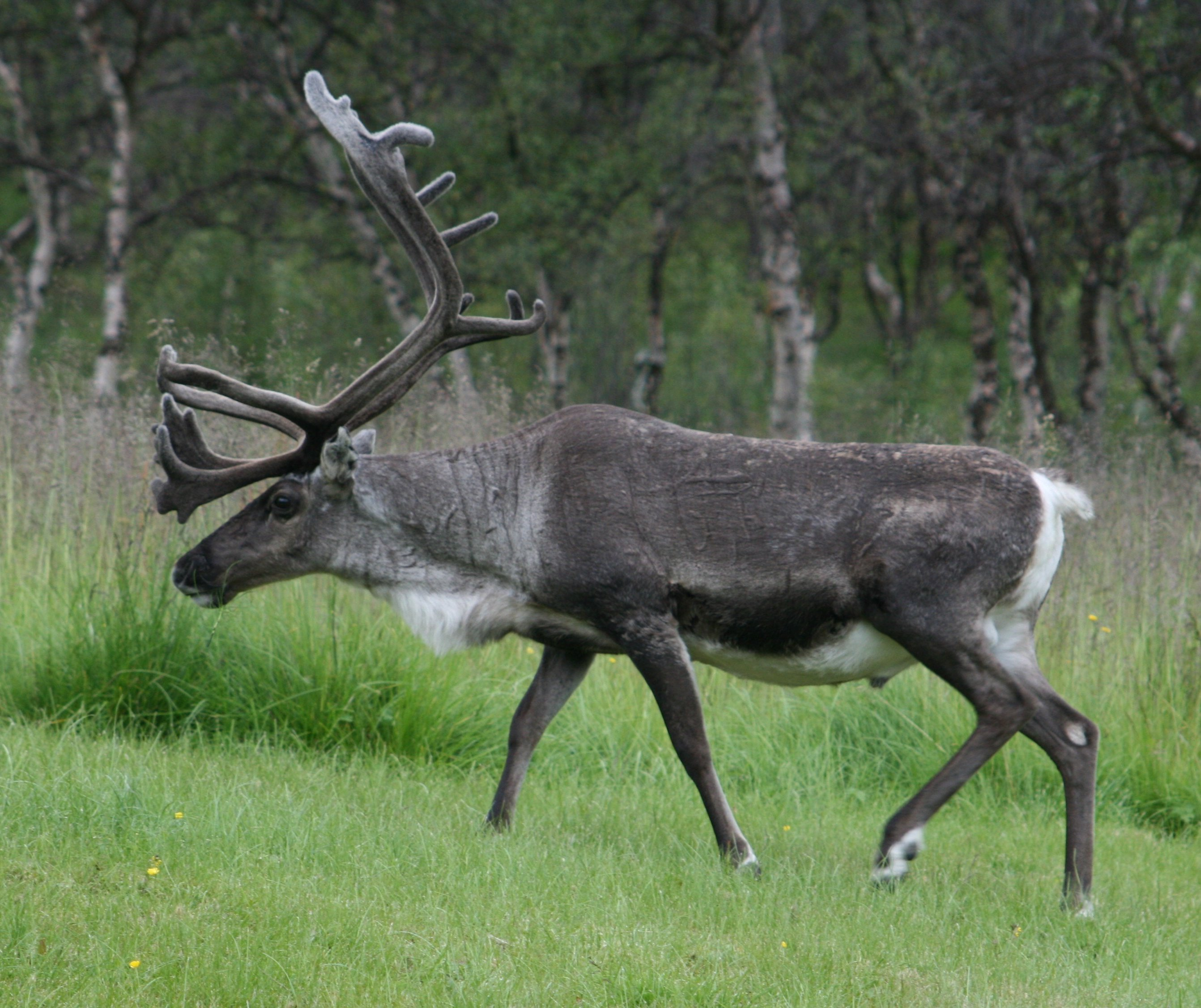
  - A living Rangifer tarandus, or reindeer
    †Rangifer tarandus
- Ranzania
  - †Ranzania grahami – type locality for species
  - †Ranzania tenneyorum – type locality for species
- †Raphoneis
  - †Raphoneis amphiceros
  - †Raphoneis lancettula
  - †Raphoneis scutula
- †Rebeccapecten
  - †Rebeccapecten berryae
- Reticulofenestra
- †Retinella
  - †Retinella electrina
  - †Retinella virginica
- Retusa
  - †Retusa obtusa
- †Rhabdosteus
- †Rhaphoneis
  - †Rhaphoneis gemmifera
  - †Rhaphoneis parilis
- †Rhegnopsis
  - †Rhegnopsis palaeatlantica – type locality for species
- Rhinobatos
  - †Rhinobatos bruxelliensis
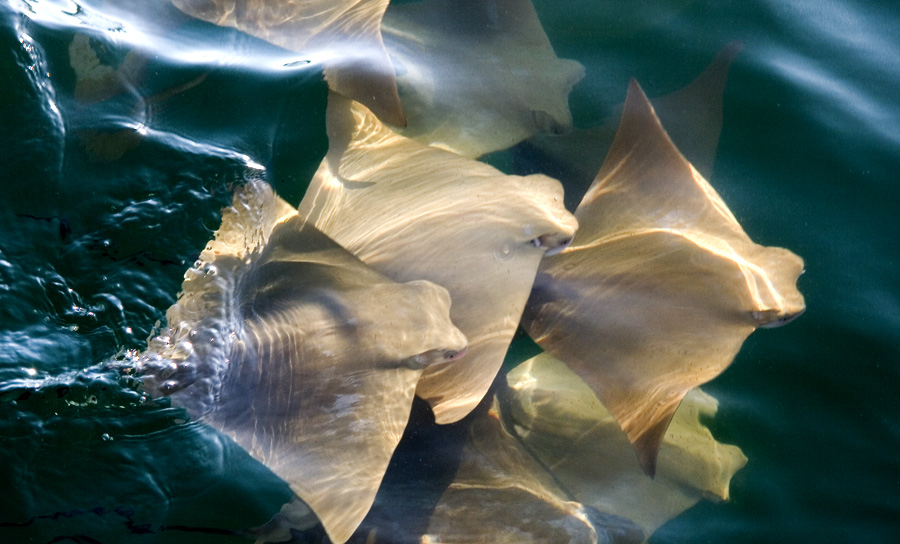
- A school of living Rhinoptera, or cownose rays
  Rhinoptera
  - †Rhinoptera sherboni
- Rosalina
  - †Rosalina columbiensis
  - †Rosalina floridana
- Rostellaria
- †Rudiscala

== S ==
- Saccella
  - †Saccella catasarca – or unidentified comparable form
  - †Saccella concentrica
  - †Saccella parva
- †Samlandia
- †Sanganoma
- †Sarda
  - †Sarda delheidi
- Sayornis
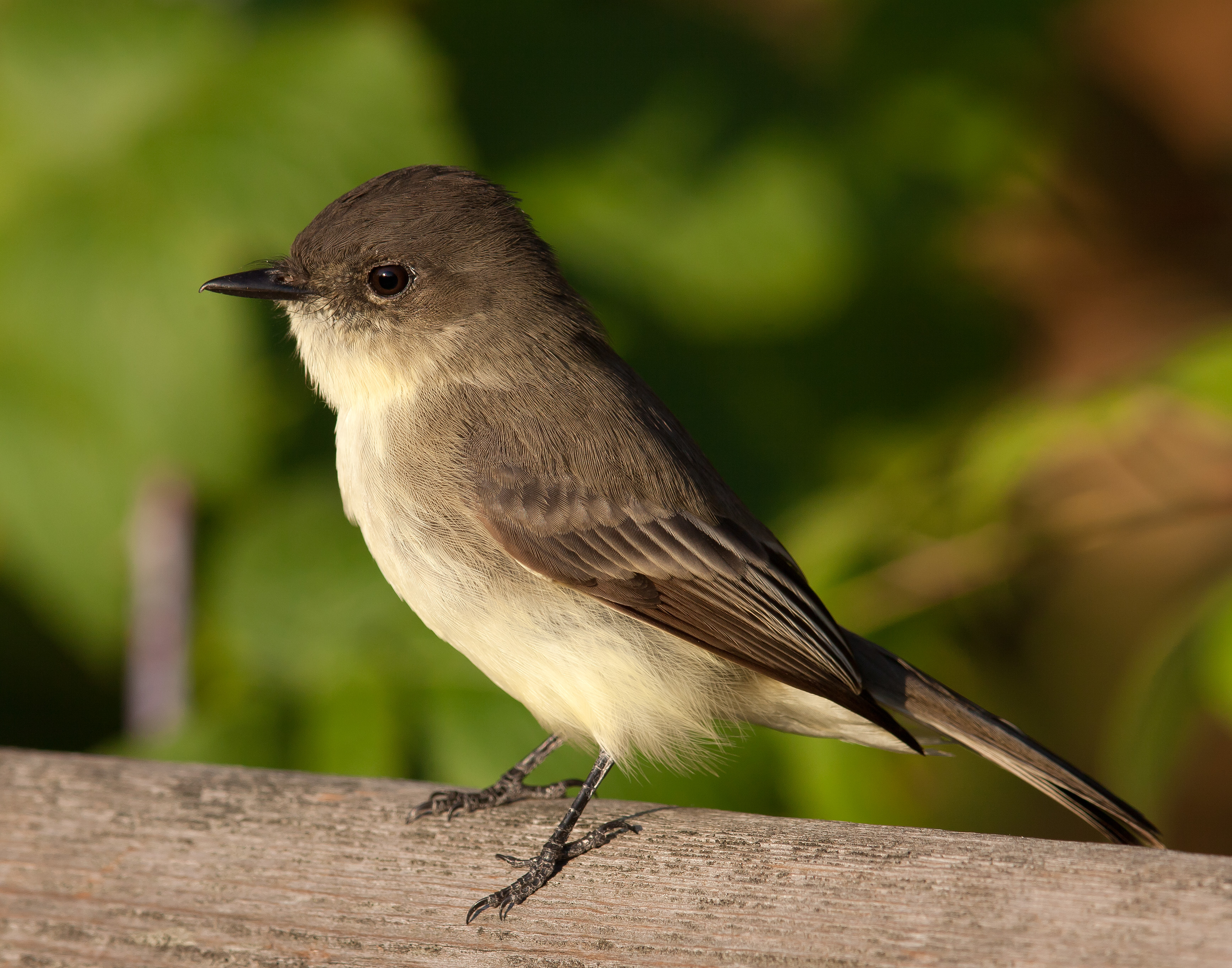
  - A living Sayornis phoebe, or eastern phoebe
    †Sayornis phoebe
- †Scala
  - †Scala virginiana – type locality for species
- †Scalaspira – report made of unidentified related form or using admittedly obsolete nomenclature
  - †Scalaspira strumosa
- Scalopus
  - †Scalopus aquaticus
- Scaphella
- Scaphiopus
  - †Scaphiopus holbrooki
- Sceloporus
  - †Sceloporus undulatus
- †Sceptrum
  - †Sceptrum marylandicum
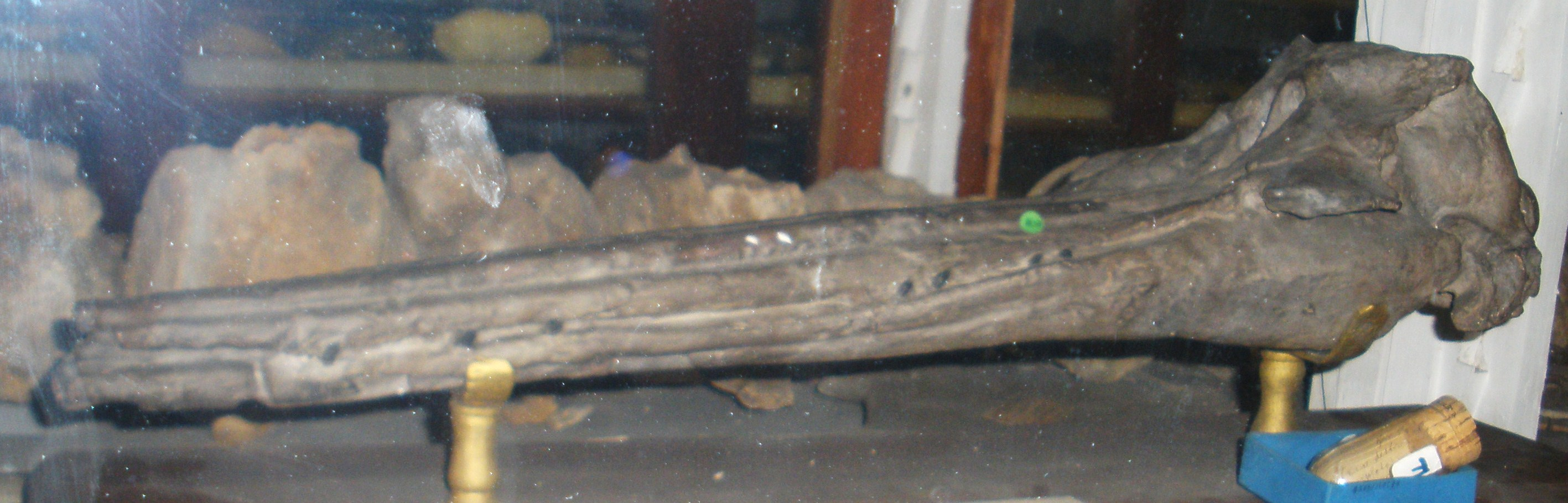
- Fossilized skull of the Miocene toothed whale Schizodelphis
  †Schizodelphis
  - †Schizodelphis barnesi
  - †Schizodelphis sulcatus
- Schizoporella
  - †Schizoporella errata
- Sciaenops
  - †Sciaenops ocellatus
- †Sciaenurus – or unidentified comparable form
  - †Sciaenurus bowerbanki
- Sciuropterus
  - †Sciuropterus volans
- Sciurus
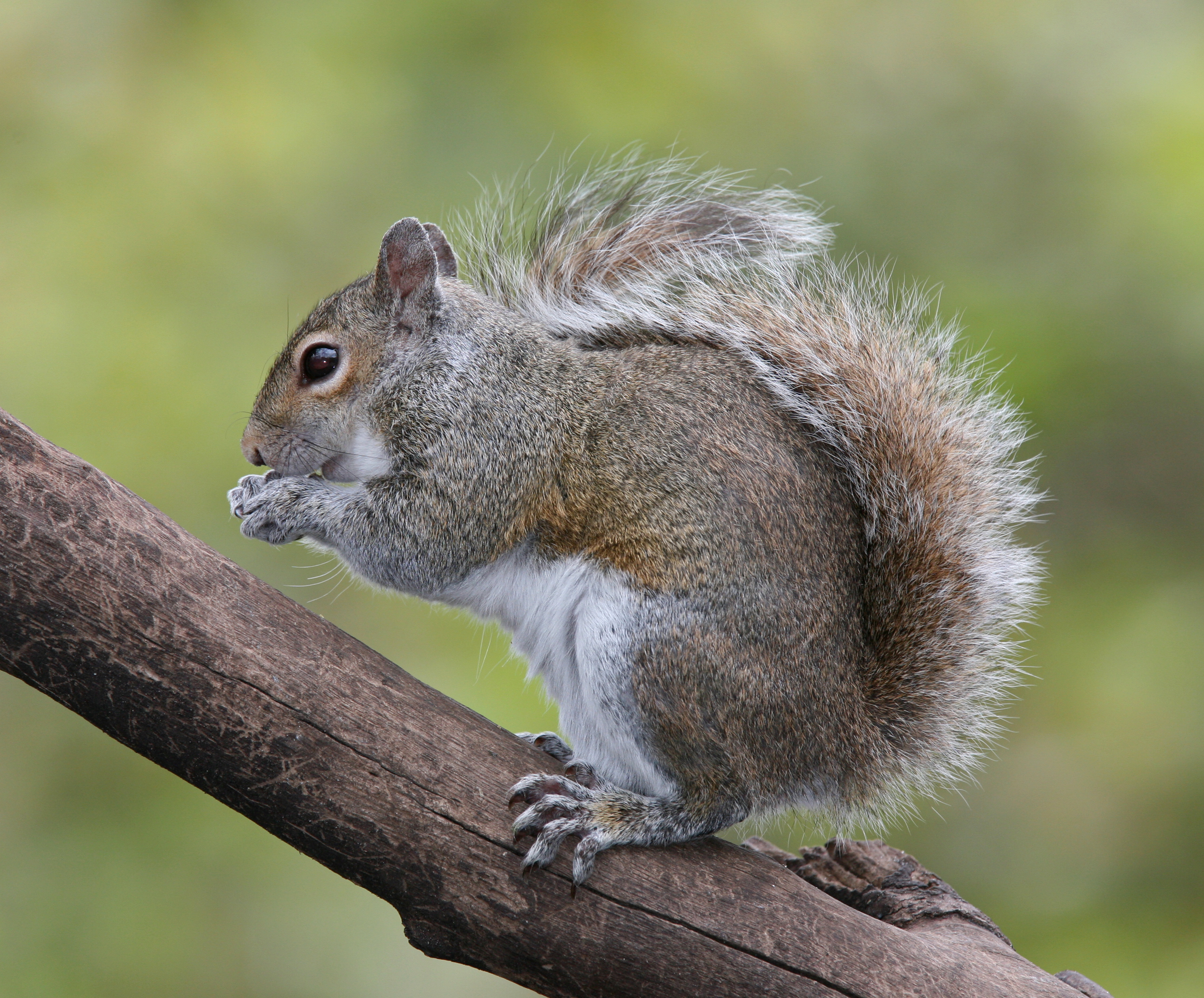
  - A living Sciurus carolinensis, or eastern gray squirrel
    †Sciurus carolinensis
- Scolopax
  - †Scolopax minor
- Scomberomorus
  - †Scomberomorus bleekeri
- †Scombrinus
- Scyliorhinus
  - †Scyliorhinus gilberti
- Seila
  - †Seila adamsii
- †Seiurus
- Semele
  - †Semele bellastriata
  - †Semele purpurascens – or unidentified comparable form
  - †Semele subovata
- †Semotilus
  - †Semotilus corporalis – or unidentified comparable form
- Serpulorbis
  - †Serpulorbis granifera
  - †Serpulorbis granulifera
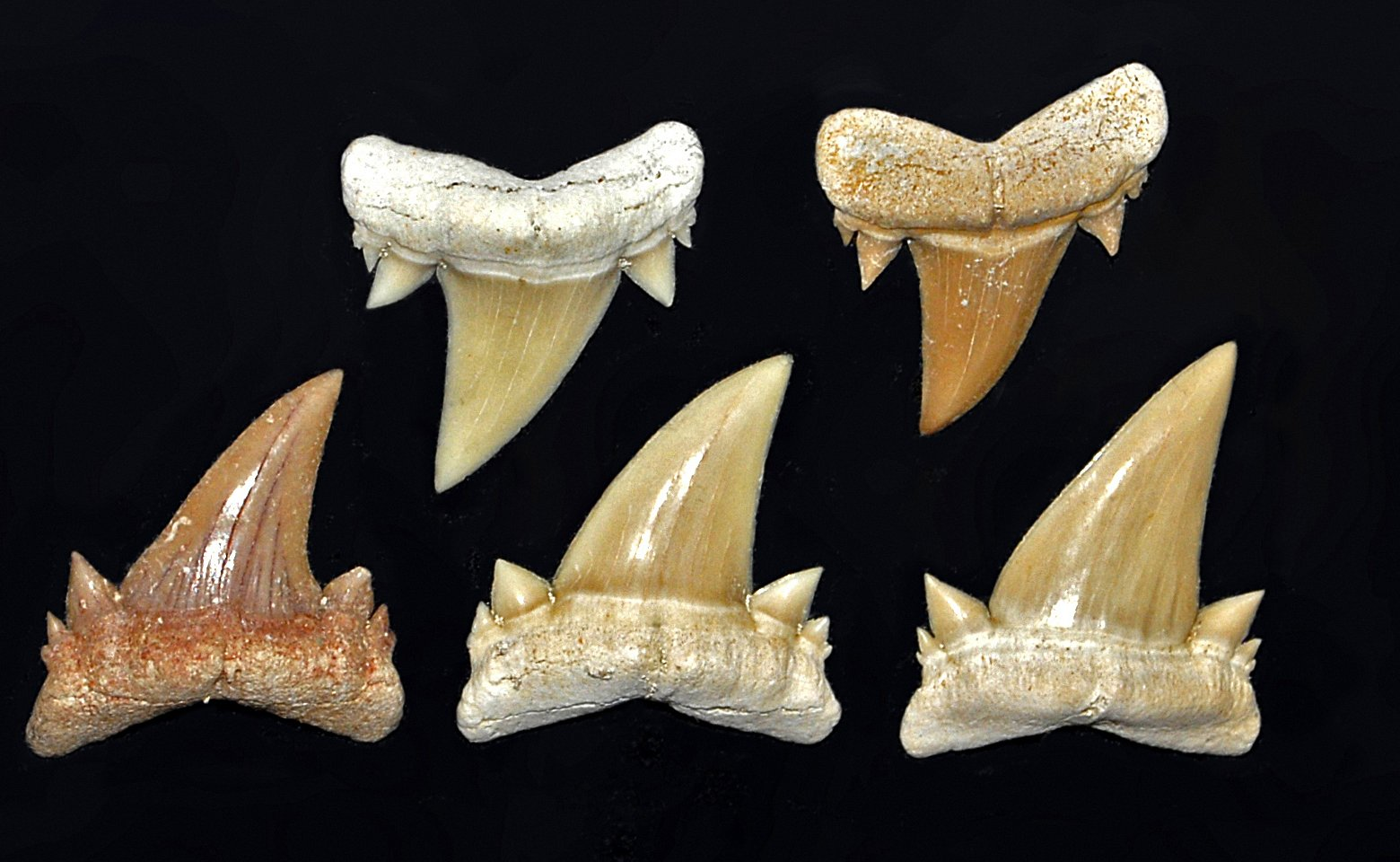
- Fossilized teeth of the Cretaceous-Eocene shark Serratolamna
  †Serratolamna
  - †Serratolamna aschersoni
  - †Serratolamna lerichei
- †Sialia – or unidentified comparable form
  - †Sialia sialis
- Sinum
  - †Sinum fragilis
- †Siphonocetus
  - †Siphonocetus priscus – type locality for species
- Sitta
  - †Sitta canadensis
- †Solarium
- Solemya
  - †Solemya velum
- Solen
- Solenosteira
  - †Solenosteira cancellaria
- Sorex
  - †Sorex arcticus
  - †Sorex cinereus
  - †Sorex dispar
  - †Sorex fumeus
  - †Sorex hoyi
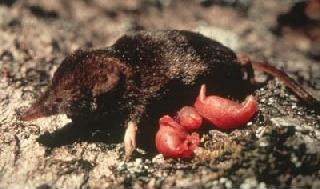
  - A living Sorex palustris, or American water shrew
    †Sorex palustris
- †Spatangus
  - †Spatangus glenni
- Spermophilus
  - †Spermophilus tridecemlineatus
- Sphaerium
  - †Sphaerium striatinum
- †Sphaeroidinellopsis
  - †Sphaeroidinellopsis subdehiscens
- Sphenia
  - †Sphenia dubia
- Sphyraena
  - †Sphyraena bognorensis
- †Sphyrapicus
  - †Sphyrapicus varius
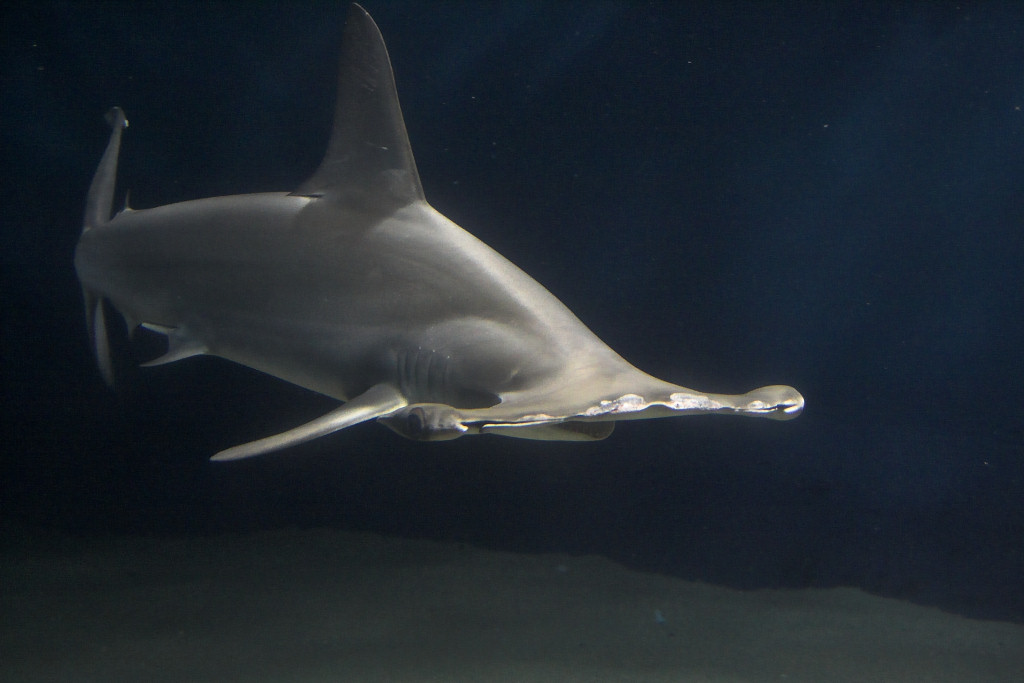
- A living Sphyrna hammerhead shark
  Sphyrna
- Spilogale
  - †Spilogale putorius
- †Spirodon
  - †Spirodon carinata
- Spisula
  - †Spisula modicella
  - †Spisula parilis
  - †Spisula praetenuis
  - †Spisula rappahannockensis
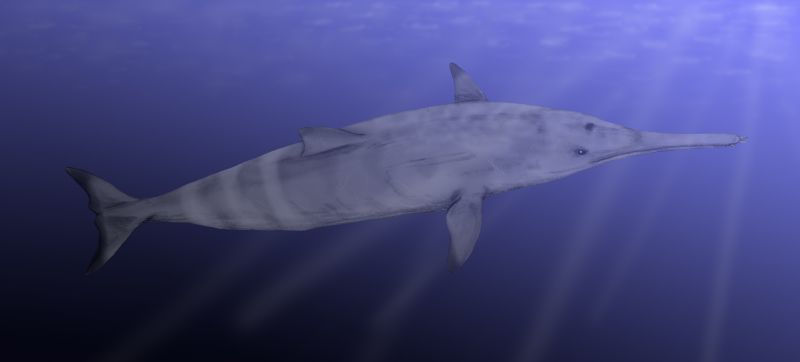
- Life restoration of the Oligocene-Miocene shark-toothed dolphin Squalodon
  †Squalodon
  - †Squalodon calvertensis
  - †Squalodon protervus – or unidentified comparable form
  - †Squalodon whitmorei – type locality for species
- Squalus
  - †Squalus crenatidens
- Squatina
  - †Squatina prima
- †Stenotrema
  - †Stenotrema fraternum
  - †Stenotrema hirsutum
- †Stephanopyxis
  - †Stephanopyxis grunowii
- Stewartia
  - †Stewartia anodonta
- Storeria
- †Strepsidura
  - †Strepsidura perlatus
- †Streptochetus – or unidentified comparable form
  - †Streptochetus potomacensis
- Striarca
  - †Striarca centenaria
  - †Striarca centernaria
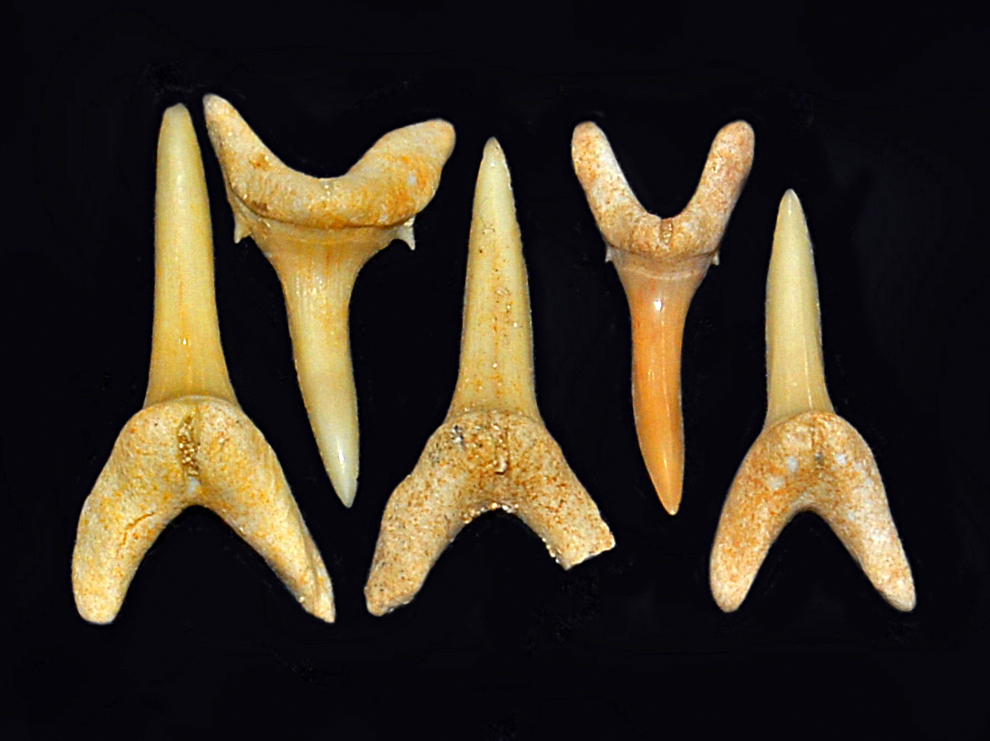
- Fossilized teeth of the Paleocene-Miocene sandshark Striatolamia
  †Striatolamia
  - †Striatolamia macrota
- Strioterebrum
  - †Strioterebrum carolinensis
  - †Strioterebrum concava
  - †Strioterebrum dislocatum
- Strobilops
  - †Strobilops labyrinthica
- Strombiformis
- Sturnella – or unidentified comparable form
- †Sullivanichthys – type locality for genus
  - †Sullivanichthys mccloskeyi – type locality for species
- †Sumbos
  - †Sumbos cavifrons
- Surculites
- Sveltia – or unidentified comparable form
- †Syllomus
  - †Syllomus aegyptiacus – type locality for species
  - †Syllomus crispatus
- Sylvilagus
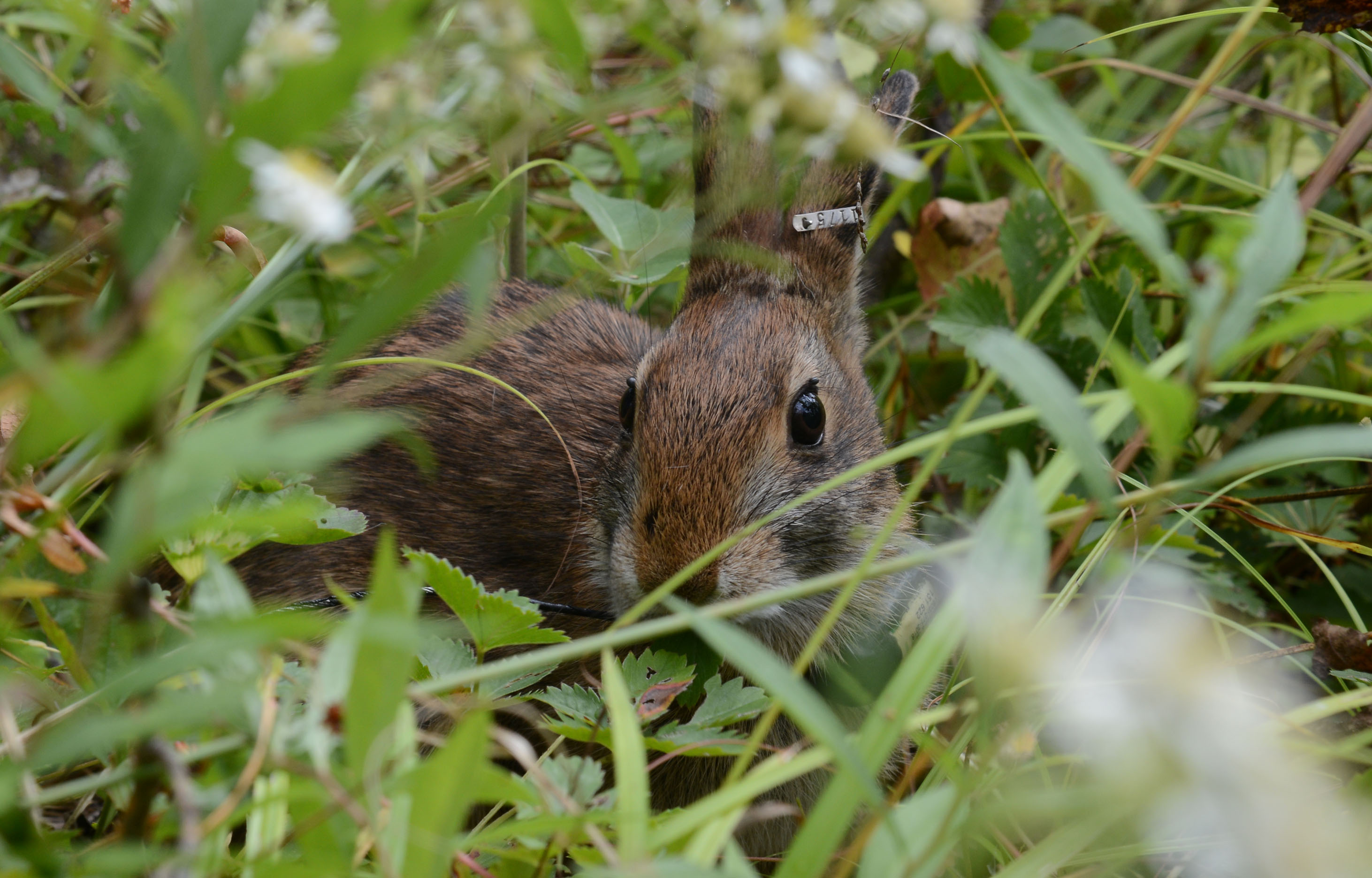
  - A living Sylvilagus transitionalis, or New England cottontail
    †Sylvilagus transitionalis
- Symplocos
  - †Symplocos grimsleyi
- Synaptomys
  - †Synaptomys cooperi
  - †Synaptomys corealis

== T ==
- Tagelus
  - †Tagelus plebeius
- Tamias
  - †Tamias striatus
- †Tamiasciurius
  - †Tamiasciurius hudsonicus
- Tamiasciurus
  - †Tamiasciurus hudsonicus
  - †Tamiasciurus tenuidens – or unidentified comparable form
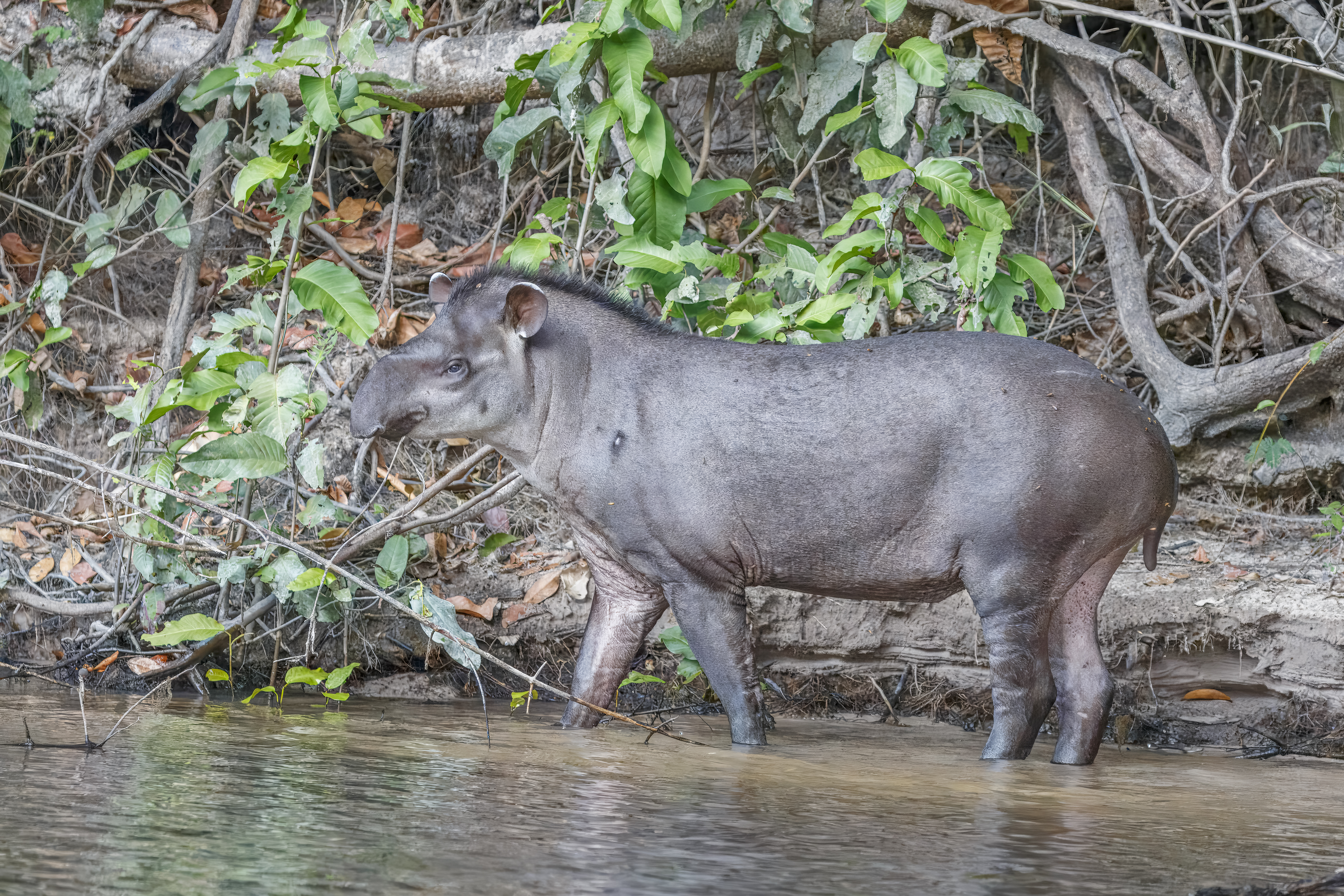
- A living Tapirus, or tapir
  Tapirus
  - †Tapirus veroensis
- Tautoga
  - †Tautoga onitis
- †Tectatodinium
  - †Tectatodinium pellitum
- Tectonatica
  - †Tectonatica pusilla
- Teinostoma
  - †Teinostoma harrisi
  - †Teinostoma umbilicatum
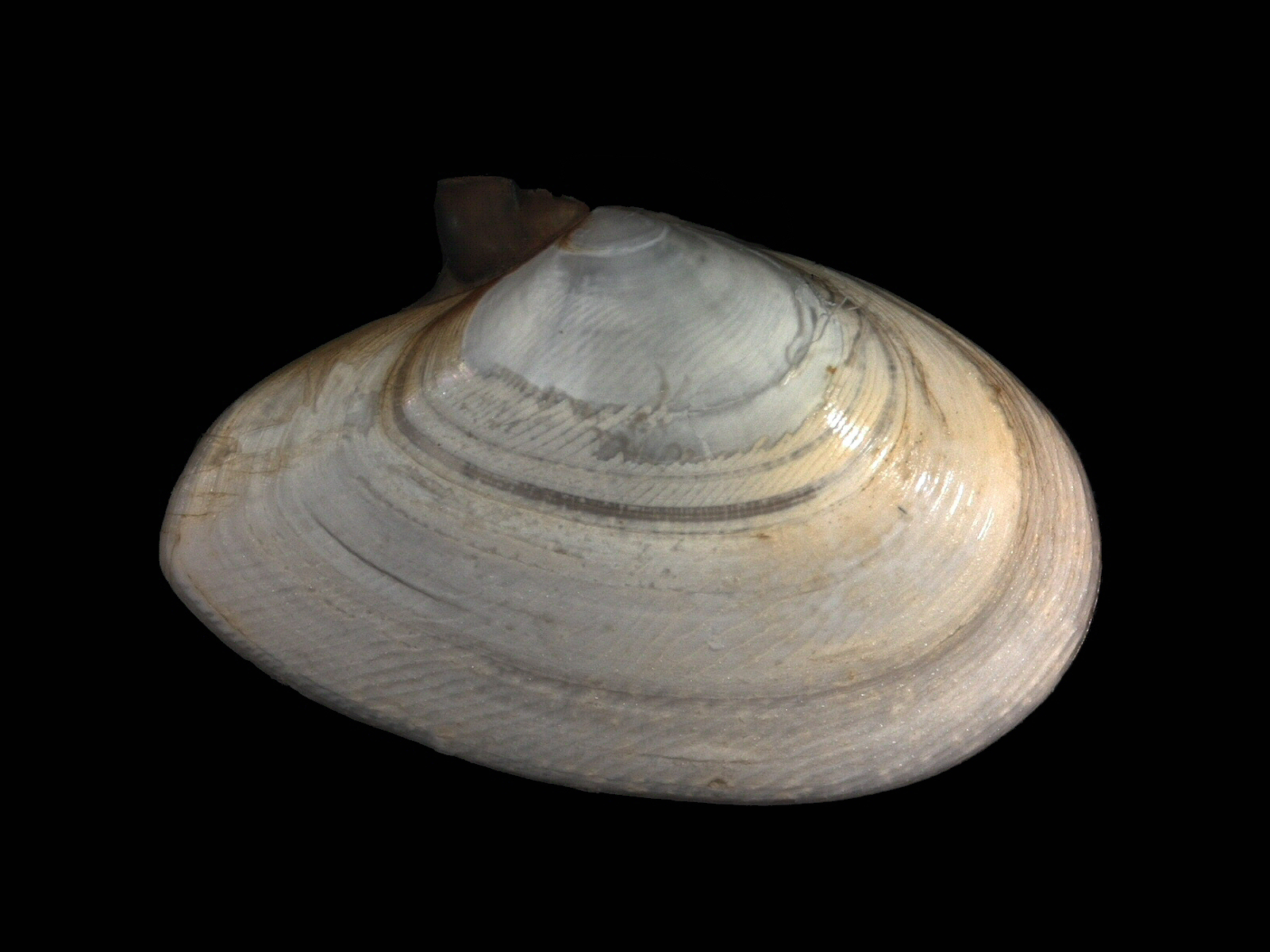
- Shell of a Tellina, or tellin
  Tellina
  - †Tellina declivis
  - †Tellina leana
  - †Tellina propetenella
  - †Tellina virginiana – type locality for species
  - †Tellina williamsi
- †Teratichthys
  - †Teratichthys antiquitatus
- Terebra
- Teredo
  - †Teredo virginiana
- Terrapene
  - †Terrapene carolina
- Textularia
- †Thalassiphora
  - †Thalassiphora pelagica
- Thamnophis
  - †Thamnophis sirtalis
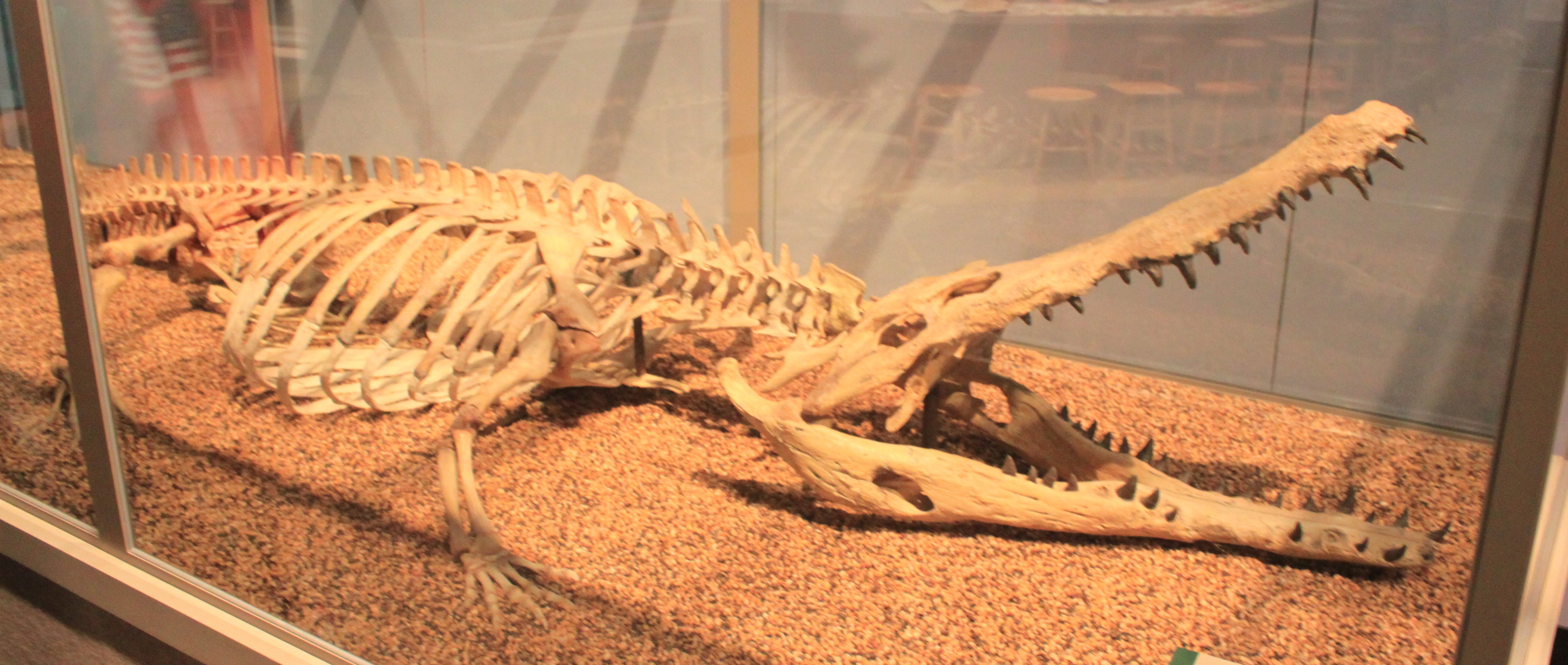
- Fossilized skeleton of the Oligocene-Miocene gavial relative Thecachampsa
  †Thecachampsa
  - †Thecachampsa antiqua
  - †Thecachampsa antiquua
- †Thinocetus – type locality for genus
  - †Thinocetus arthritus – type locality for species
- †Thoracosaurus
  - †Thoracosaurus neocesariensis
- Thracia
- †Thuja
  - †Thuja occidentalis
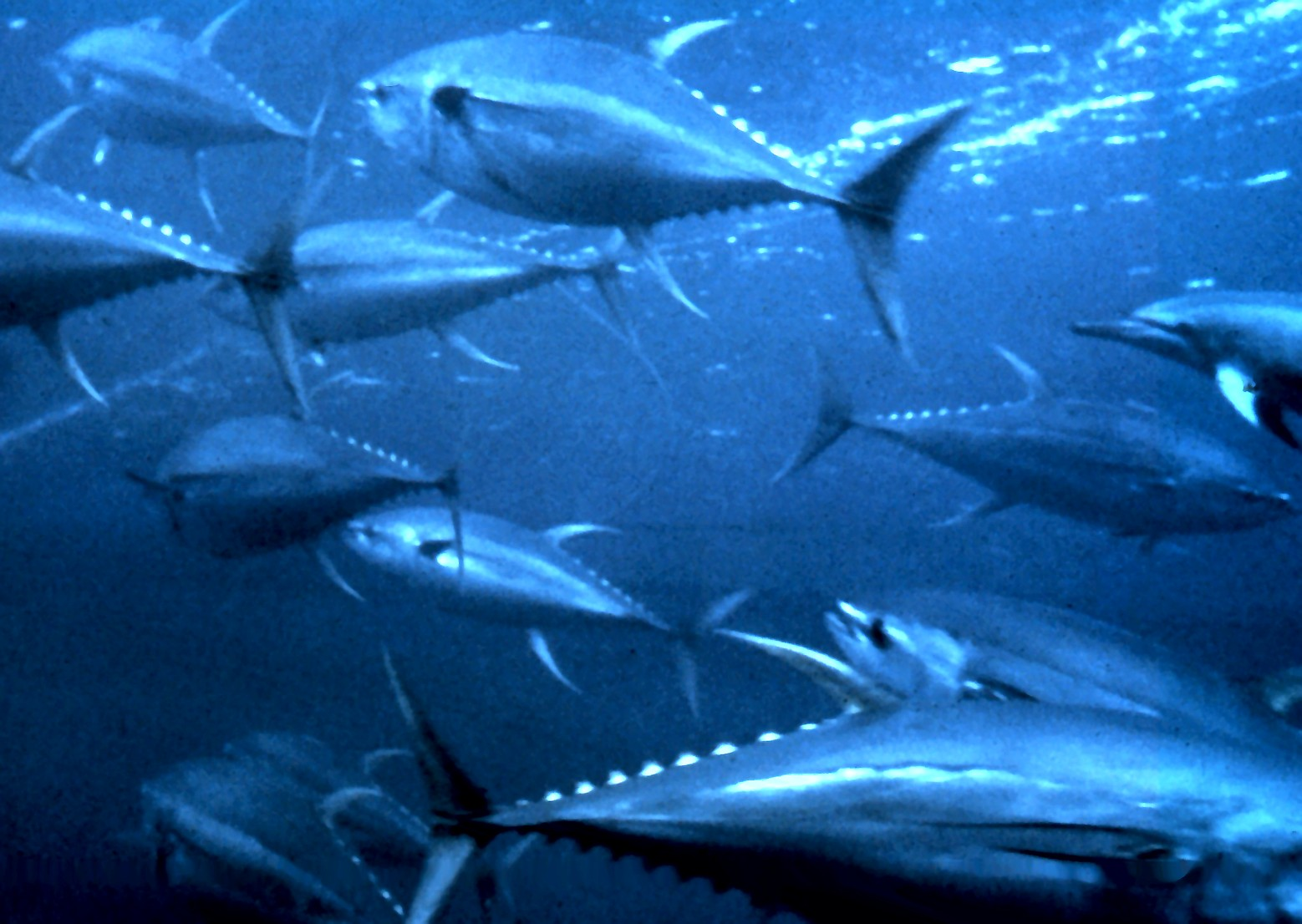
- A school of living Thunnus, or tunas
  Thunnus
- Tilia
- Tinospora
  - †Tinospora folmerii
- Torcula
  - †Torcula variabilis
- †Tornatellaea
- Toxostoma
  - †Toxostoma rufum
- Transennella
  - †Transennella carolinensis
- †Tretosphys
- Triakis
  - †Triakis wardi
- Trigonostoma
- Tringa – or unidentified comparable form
  - †Tringa solitaria
- †Triodopsis
  - †Triodopsis albolabris
  - †Triodopsis burchi
  - †Triodopsis juxtidens
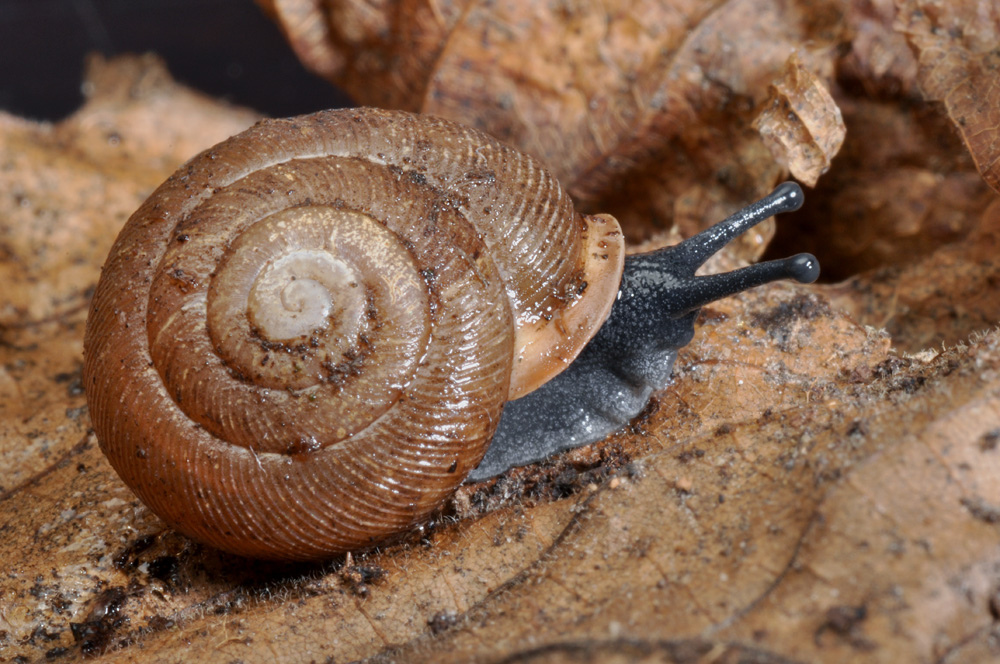
  - A living Triodopsis tridentata land snail, or northern threetooth
    †Triodopsis tridentata
  - †Triodopsis vulgata
- Triphora
- †Triphotrocha
  - †Triphotrocha comprinata – or unidentified comparable form
- Trochita
  - †Trochita aperta
  - †Trochita trochiformis
- Trochocyathus
  - †Trochocyathus mitratus
- Trox
- †Tsuga
  - †Tsuga canadensis – or unidentified comparable form
- Tucetona
  - †Tucetona pectinata
- Tudicla – or unidentified comparable form
- †Turbinolia
  - †Turbinolia acuticostata
- †Turbiosphaera – tentative report
- Turbonilla
  - †Turbonilla interrupta
  - †Turbonilla potomacensis
- †Turborotalia – report made of unidentified related form or using admittedly obsolete nomenclature
  - †Turborotalia acostaensis
- Turdus
  - †Turdus migratorius
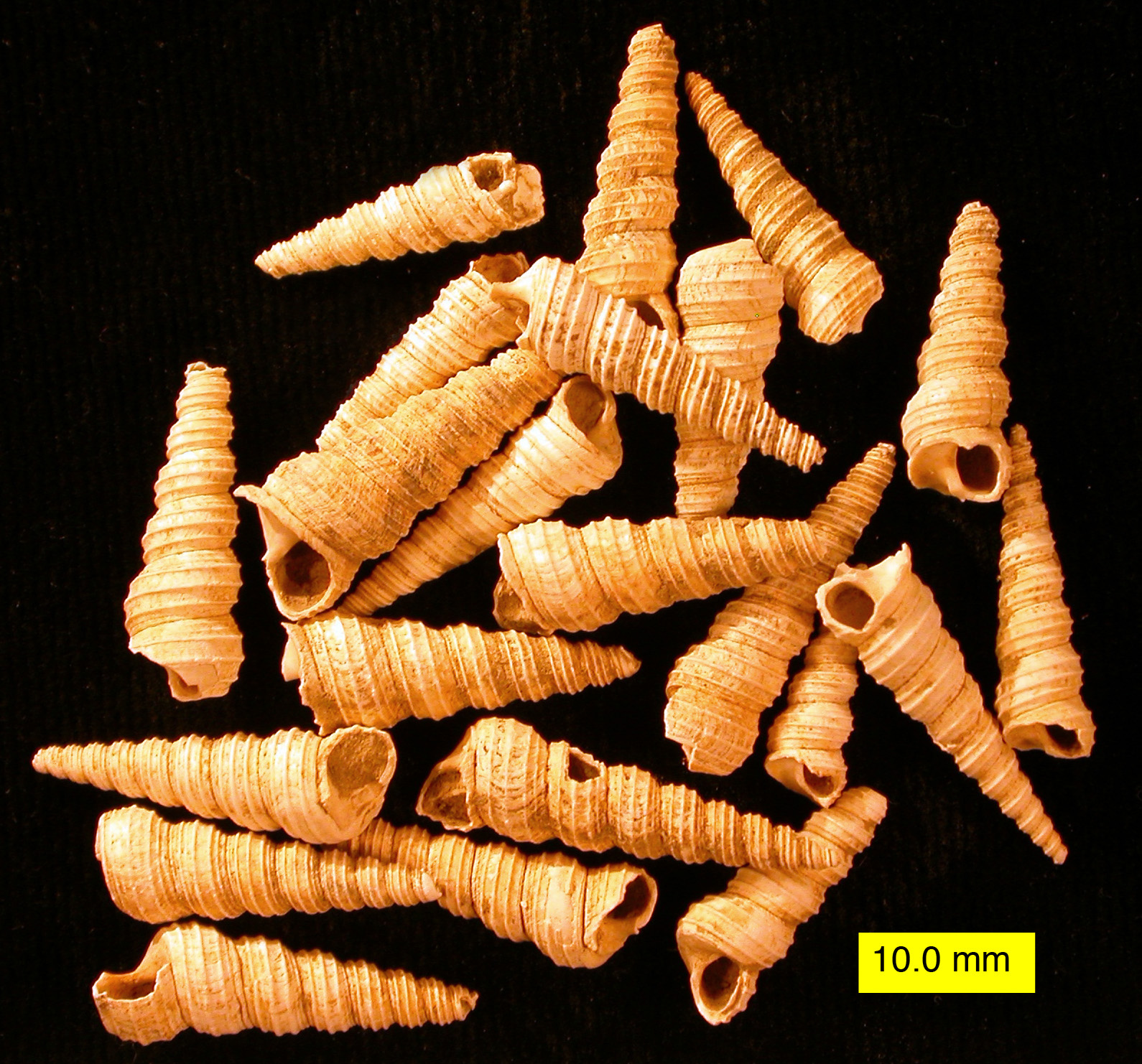
- Fossilized shells of the Late Jurassic-modern tower snail Turritella
  Turritella
  - †Turritella alticostata
  - †Turritella humerosa
  - †Turritella invariabilis
  - †Turritella nasuta
  - †Turritella pilsbryi
  - †Turritella potomacensis
  - †Turritella praecincta
  - †Turritella subvariabilis

== U ==
- Uria
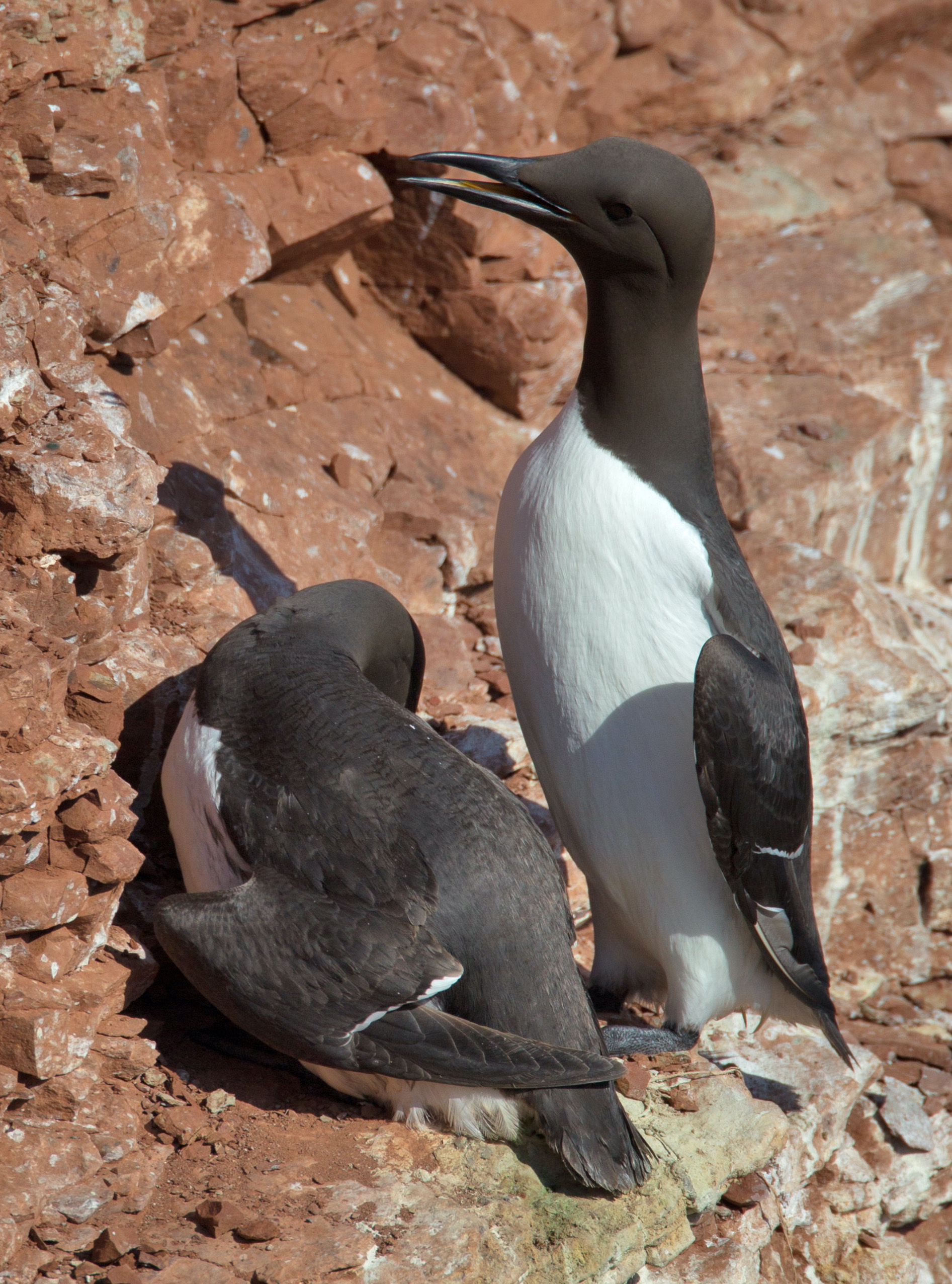
  - A pair of living Uria aalge, or common murre
    †Uria aalge
- Urosalpinx
  - †Urosalpinx cinera
  - †Urosalpinx cinerea
  - †Urosalpinx phrikina
  - †Urosalpinx rusticus
  - †Urosalpinx subrusticus
  - †Urosalpinx trossulus
- Ursus
  - †Ursus americanus

== V ==
- Vallonia
  - †Vallonia costata
- Valvata
- Venericardia
  - †Venericardia densata
  - †Venericardia planicosta
  - †Venericardia potapacoensis
  - †Venericardia regia
- Vermetus
- Vertigo
  - †Vertigo gouldi
  - †Vertigo tridentata
- Vitis
- Vitrinella
  - †Vitrinella virginiensis
- †Vokesinotus
  - †Vokesinotus lepidotus
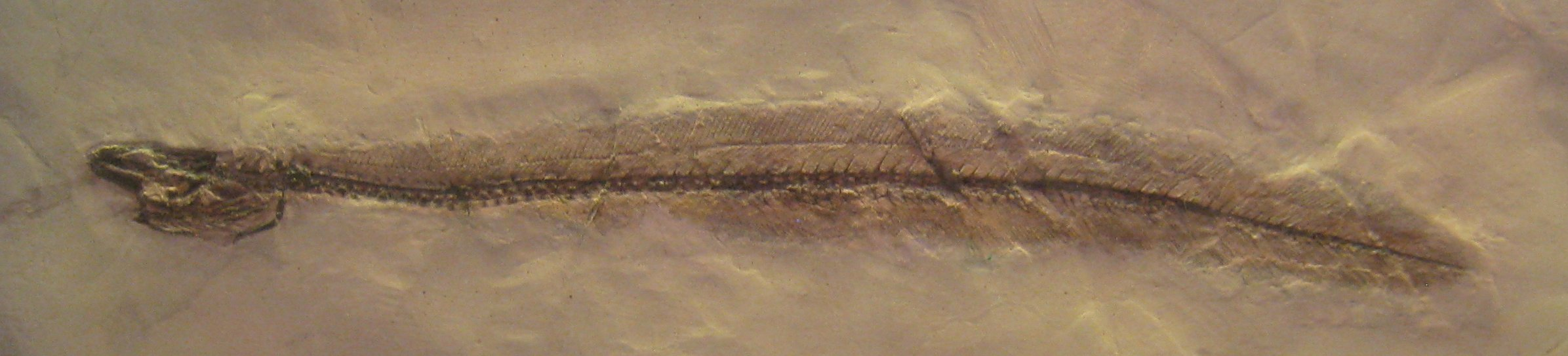
- Fossilized skeleton of the Eocene bony fish Voltaconger
  †Voltaconger
  - †Voltaconger latispinus
- Voluta
  - †Voluta mutabilis
- Volutifusus
  - †Volutifusus obtusa
- Vulpes

== W ==
- †Wetherellia
  - †Wetherellia marylandica
- †Wetzeliella

== X ==
- Xenophora
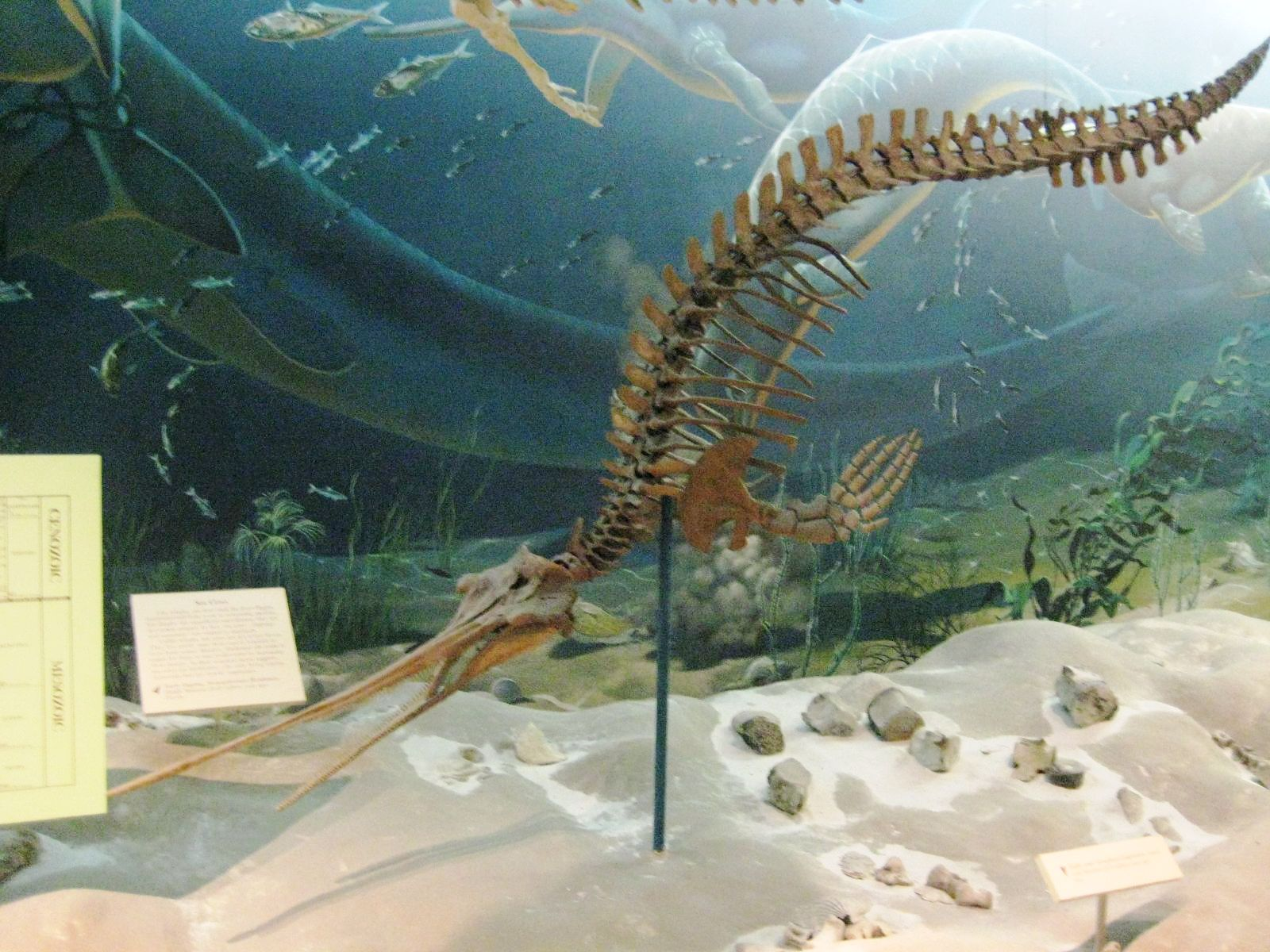
- Fossilized skeleton of the Miocene whale Xiphiacetus
  †Xiphiacetus
  - †Xiphiacetus bossi – type locality for species
  - †Xiphiacetus cristatus – type locality for species

== Y ==
- Yoldia
  - †Yoldia laevis
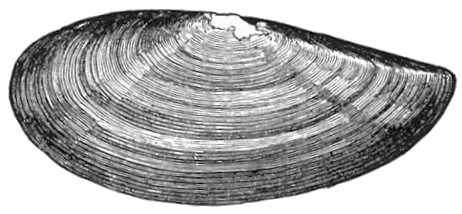
  - Illustration of the shell of a Yoldia limatula, or file yoldia
    †Yoldia limatula
  - †Yoldia potomacensis

== Z ==
- Zapus
  - †Zapus hudsonius
- †Zarhachis
- Zonotrichia
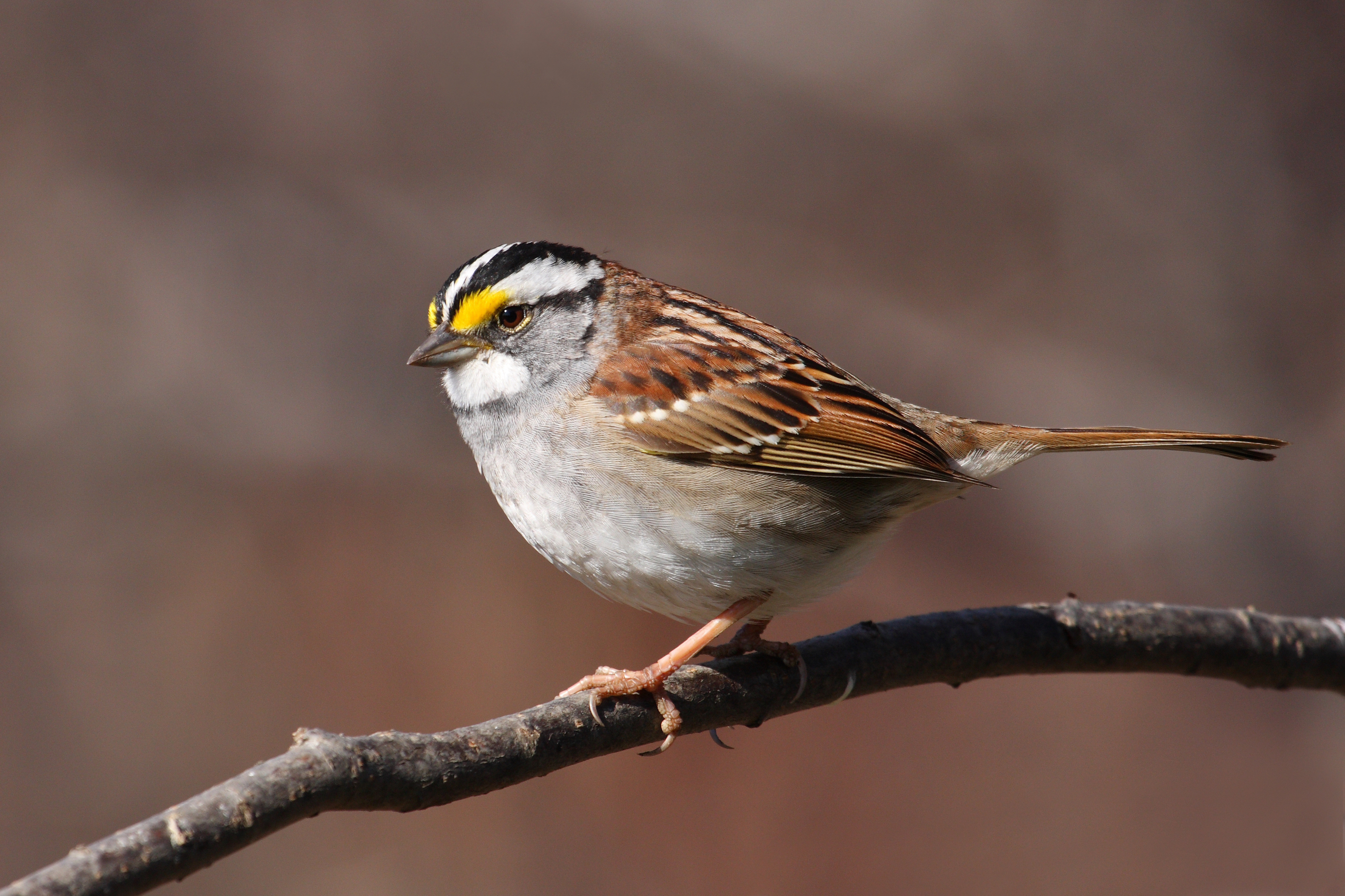
  - A living Zonotrichia albicollis, or white-throated sparrow
    †Zonotrichia albicollis
