= Nanjemoy Formation =

Geologic formation in the United States

- Stratigraphic range: Ypresian (Wasatchian); ~54.5–50.3 Ma
- Type: Formation
- Unit of: Pamunkey Group
- Sub-units: Woodstock & Potapaco
- Underlies: Piney Point & Calvert
- Overlies: Aquia & Marlboro Clay
- Thickness: About 20 m (66 ft)

Lithology
- Primary: Sandstone, claystone
- Other: Marl, limestone

Location
- Coordinates: 38.8°N 76.7°W
- Approximate paleocoordinates: 39.1°N 60.8°W
- Region: Virginia, Maryland, District of Columbia
- Country: United States
- Extent: Extent

Type section
- Named for: Nanjemoy Creek; Etymology
- Named by: Clark & Martin
- Year defined: 1901
- Nanjemoy Formation (the United States) Nanjemoy Formation (Maryland)

The Nanjemoy Formation is a geologic formation pertaining to both the Wilcox Group and the Pamunkey Group of the eastern United States, stretching across the states of Virginia, Maryland, and the District of Columbia. The formation crops out east of the Appalachians and dates back to the Ypresian stage of the Eocene epoch, about 55 to 50 Ma or Wasatchian in the NALMA classification. It is roughly contemporaneous with the Wasatch Formation of the Interior West.

The 20 metres (66 ft)-thick formation crops out in a narrow irregular band in some of the creeks in southern Maryland, and on the southern side of the Potomac River in northern Virginia. The formation was divided into two members by Clark and Martin in 1901; the Potapaco and Woodstock, representing different phases in the basin history. The lower Potapaco Member is much more clayey, described as marl, than the upper Woodstock Member, which is probably characteristic of less storm influences in the shallow shelf sediments.

The formation has provided a wealth of fossils of mainly fish, but also mammals, reptiles, birds and flora. The presence of the sharks Otodus obliquus and Otodus aksuaticus, as well as various other shark and ray species are notable. Crocodylian, snake, turtle, mammal, and bird remains have all been found in the Nanjemoy Formation.

== Etymology ==
The formation is named after Nanjemoy Creek, a left tributary of the Potomac River. Nanjemoy is probably an Ojibwe word, meaning "one goes downward," representing the many rivers and creeks in the wet watershed of the Chesapeake Bay, an area originally inhabited by the Algonquin-speaking Nanticoke and Powhatan. Potapaco was an early name for Port Tobacco Creek that was named after the Piscataway people

== Definition ==
The Nanjemoy Formation was defined by Clark and Martin in 1901, as part of the mapping by the Maryland Geological Survey. The Nanjemoy Formation was divided into two members, the lower or Potapaco, and the upper or Woodstock. The main lithologic distinction is that the lower part of the Nanjemoy is much more clayey than the upper part. In the subsurface, the distinction between the members is less evident than in outcrops, especially in Maryland, so the formation has been left undivided.

In the outcrops along the Potomac River near Popes Creek, the contact between the Woodstock and Potapaco at about 10 feet (3.0 m) above the water level.

== Extent ==
Nanjemoy Formation (Virginia)	Nanjemoy Formation (Maryland)
Notable sites of the Nanjemoy Formation in the Potomac River basin in northeastern Virginia and western Maryland; NC - Nanjemoy Creek, Ws - Woodstock, FS - Fisher/Sullivan site

The geologic map of the Washington West 30' × 60' Quadrangle (containing Maryland, Virginia, and Washington D.C.) maps out the Nanjemoy Formation, represented as Tn, as restricted to the southeastern side of the Potomac Basin. In his thesis, Scott (2005) included a map showing the thin bands of outcrops of both the underlying Marlboro Clay and the Nanjemoy Formation, restricted to the many creeks feeding the Chesapeake Bay. The Nanjemoy Formation (Eocene), the Marlboro Clay (Paleocene), and the Aquia Formation (Paleocene) are present in the westernmost part of the Potomac channel. The outcrop area of the formation is designated Nanjemoy Wildlife Management Area.

== Geology ==
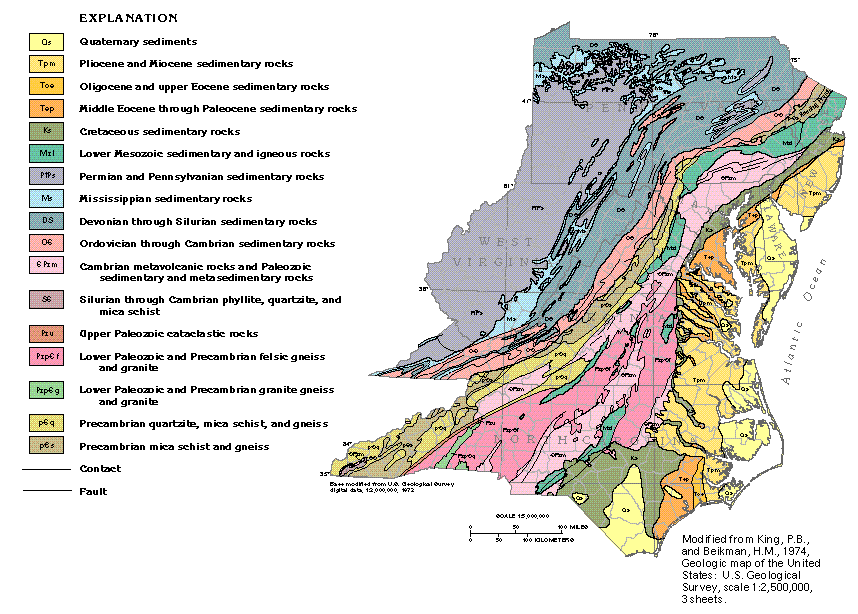
The Nanjemoy Formation is represented by the orange Paleo-Eocene surrounding the Potomac River

Geologically, the area of deposition of the Nanjemoy Formation is part of the Atlantic coastal plain province. The depositional environment of the Nanjemoy Formation is mostly shallow shelf. The more clayey beds suggest an area or time of quiet water, not affected by waves, tides, or current activity; intercalated sandier zones may reflect the higher energy of waves or currents during episodic storms. Its regional dip is eastward at 15–20 ft per mile (3-3.5 m/km).

=== Stratigraphy ===
The Nanjemoy Formation belongs to two geologic groups; the Wilcox Group of the Gulf of Mexico Basin in the southernmost surface expression of the formation and the Pamunkey Group in the northern and central portions from Maryland in the north through Virginia and the Carolinas. Both geologic groups have been dated to the early Paleogene; the Paleocene and Eocene periods, or in the commonly used NALMA classification; Wasatchian, defined by the age-equivalent Wasatch Formation of Wyoming.

This formation is the third-oldest formation in the Pamunkey Group and overlies the Marlboro Clay. The Nanjemoy is partly overlain by the Piney Point Formation and in many areas covered by the Miocene Calvert Formation, separated by an unconformity representing about 34 Ma.

The upper surface reaches an elevation of about 50 metres (160 ft) and is overlain in most places by the Calvert Formation (Tc). The unit is present only in the southeastern part of the map area of Washington D.C., and it reaches a maximum thickness of about 20 metres (66 ft).

=== Petrology ===
The formation comprises glauconitic quartz sand, dark-grayish-green to olive-black (tan to orange where weathered), fine to medium-grained; and dark-greenish-gray silty clay. In places, the sand is very muddy or contains many small quartz pebbles, and the clay is silty or sandy. Both lithologies contain richly fossiliferous beds including abundant mollusk shells.

Robert E. Weems and Gary J. Grimsley (1999) described the geology of the Fisher/Sullivan site in Virginia as:

Formation	Member	Bed	Lithology	Thickness (ft)
Nanmejoy	Potomac	B	Sand, dominantly quartz, fine-grained, well sorted, micaceous, glauconitic, medium-brown, spa$e wood fragments present and molds and casts of shells	1
Nanmejoy	Potomac	B	Sand, dominantly quartz, dominantly fine-grained but with abundant rounded grains of medium- to coarse-grained quartz and scattered rounded quartz granules and pebbles to 1 cm (0.39 in) in diameter, glauconitic, medium-brown, contains abundant shell casts of Venericardia potapacoensis and abundant teeth and bones	2
Unconformity
Nanmejoy	Potomac	A	Sand, dominantly quartz, very fine- to fine-grained, bioturbated and massive, glauconitic, medium-brownish- gray, scattered wood fragments throughout and scattered molds and casts of shells, upper foot bioturbated and burrows filled with matrix from above bed, basal foot contains abundant medium- to coarse-grains and is more glauconitic than sediments above	15
Marlboro Clay			Clay, silty, finely micaceous, greasy, sticky, lightgray, upper two feet intensely burrowed and burrows filled with matrix from bed above	8
Total section exposed				26

== Paleoecology ==
The floral and faunal assemblage of the Nanjemoy Formation is diverse and provides an insight into the paleobiological and paleoclimatological environment of the early Eocene. Fossils of bivalves, sharks, rays, actinopterygian fishes, reptiles, birds and mammals, and of fruits and seeds are common in the Potapaco Member. More than 2000 vertebrate coprolites from the Potapaco Member at the Fisher/Sullivan Site in Virginia were analyzed by Dentzien Dias et al. (2019). The chemical composition (phosphatic), inclusions and morphology suggest that only carnivorous scats were preserved.

All Nanjemoy coprolites were produced by fishes, namely carcharhiniform & lamniform sharks, probably the genus Carcharias. Other morphotypes were produced by actinopterygian fishes. The surface marks and the lack of flatness on most coprolites suggests early lithification of the Potapaco Member.

Main fossil sites of the Nanjemoy Formation are

- Nanjemoy Creek; Charles County, MD
- Woodstock; King George County, VA
- Fisher/Sullivan; Stafford County, VA
- Evergreen Plantation; Prince Charles County, VA

=== Fisher/Sullivan site, VA ===
In October 1990, Mr. Richard Brezina of the Maryland Geological Society (MGS) discovered an important fossil site east of Fredericksburg, in eastern Stafford County, Virginia. This locality, along an unnamed tributary of Muddy Creek, became known as the Fisher/Sullivan site in recognition of its principle landowners.

Brezina immediately realized that the site was exceptional, because it yielded numerous shark teeth and other vertebrate remains from the sands and gravels in the unnamed tributary. Brezina notified other members of the Maryland Geological Society, and together members of the MGS began to screen stream sediments at the site for more shark teeth and other remains. It soon became apparent, from the types of teeth that were being found and from the color and texture of the sediments in the banks of the creek, that the fossils were being reworked from glauconitic ("greensand") horizons of the Lower Tertiary (Paleocene-Eocene) Pamunkey Group.

Because the Pamunkey Group previously had yielded only sparse vertebrate remains, it seemed reasonable to suspect that this locality was scientifically important.

== Vertebrate paleobiota ==
=== Mammals ===
Based on Weems & Grimsley (1999):

Mammals of the Nanjemoy Formation
Taxon	Species	Fossils	Member	Notes	Images
cf. Esthonyx	cf. E. sp.			A tillodont.	
aff. Homogalax	aff. A. sp.			An isectolophid tapiromorph.	
cf. Hyopsodus	cf. H. sp.			A hyopsodontid ungulate relative.	
Miacidae indet.				A miacid carnivoraform of uncertain affinities.	
Nyctitheriidae indet.				A nyctitheriid eulipotyphlan of uncertain affinities.	
Omomyidae indet.				An omomyid primate.	
cf. Palaeosinopa	cf. P. sp.			A pantolestid.	
Peradectes	P. gulottai			A peradectid metatherian. Type locality of species.	
Ischyromyidae indet.				A potential ischyromyid rodent.	

=== Birds ===
Based on Mayr et al (2021):

Birds of the Nanjemoy Formation
Taxon	Species	Fossils	Notes	Images
?Caprimulgidae indet.			A potential nightjar relative.	
Charadriiformes indet.	sp. A.		A shorebird of uncertain affinities.	
Charadriiformes indet.	sp. B.		A shorebird of uncertain affinities.	
Charadriiformes indet.	?Charadriiformes indet.		A shorebird of uncertain affinities.	
cf. Coturnipes	cf C. sp.		A messelornithid gruiform.	
cf. Eocypselidae			A potential eocypselid apodiform of uncertain affinities.	
"Graculavidae" indet.	sp. 1		A waterbird of uncertain affinities. Potentially a threshkiornithid.	
"Graculavidae" indet.	sp. 2		A waterbird of uncertain affinities. Potentially a threshkiornithid.	
Halcyornithidae indet.			A halcyornithid eufalconimorphan of uncertain affinities.	
cf. Limnofregata	cf. L. sp.		A potential frigatebird.	
Messelasturidae indet.			A messelasturid eufalconimorphan of uncertain affinities.	
cf. Microena			A bird similar to the putative columbiform Microena from the London Clay.	
cf. Morsoravis			A morsoravid bird.	
Parvicuculidae indet.			A parvicuculid bird. Previously assigned to the Aegialornithidae.	
Pelagornithidae indet.			A pseudotooth bird.	
?Phoenicopteriformes indet.			A potential flamingo relative. Potentially a threshkiornithid instead.	
?Procellariiformes indet.			A potential tubenose.	
cf. Pumiliornis	cf P. sp.		A psittacopedid.	
?Steatornithidae indet.			A relative of the oilbird.	
cf. Threskiornithidae			A potential ibis. The "graculavid" and "phoenicopteriform" previously reported may be conspecific with this taxon.	
Ypresiglaux	Y. gulottai		An extremely small protostrigid owl, one of the smallest owls known to have existed. Type locality of species. Initially described in Eostrix.	
Zygodactylidae indet.			A zygodactylid psittacopasseran of uncertain affinities.	

In addition, several indeterminate birds are also known, such as a very large bird the size of a sandhill crane, known only from a single pedal phalanx.

=== Reptiles ===
Reptiles of the Nanjemoy Formation
Taxon	Species	Fossils	Member	Site	Notes	Images
Bothremydidae indet					A bothremydid side-necked turtle of uncertain affinities.	
Catapleura	C. sp.				A pancheloniid sea turtle. Previously referred to Dollochelys.	
Constrictores indet.					A terrestrial constricting snake of uncertain affinities.	
"Diplocynodon"	"D. hantoniensis"				An indeterminate crocodilian, originally identified as the European alligatorid Diplocynodon hantoniensis, but now thought to be too indeterminate for even a family-level identification.	
cf. Eosphargis	cf. E. gigas				A dermochelyid sea turtle.	
Eosuchus	E. lerichei				A eusuchian crocodylomorph.	
Palaeophis	P. casei				A giant marine palaeophiid snake. Over 200+ vertebrae collected from the site, all but three of which are referable to P. toliapicus.	
Palaeophis	P. toliapicus				A giant marine palaeophiid snake. Over 200+ vertebrae collected from the site, all but three of which are referable to P. toliapicus.	
Palaeophis	P. virginianus				A giant marine palaeophiid snake. Over 200+ vertebrae collected from the site, all but three of which are referable to P. toliapicus.	
Parophisaurus	P. mccloskeyi				An anguid lizard, type locality of this species.	
Puppigerus	P. camperi				A pancheloniid sea turtle.	
Thoracosaurus	T. neocesariensis				A eusuchian crocodylomorph.	
"Trionyx"	cf. T. pennatus				A softshell turtle.	

=== Cartilaginous fish ===
==== Sharks ====
Sharks of the Nanjemoy Formation
Taxon	Species	Location	Fossils	Notes	Images
Abdounia	A. beaugei			A requiem shark.	
Abdounia	A. minutissima			A requiem shark.	
Abdounia	A. recticona			A requiem shark.	
Anomotodon	A. novus			A goblin shark.	
Carcharias	C. hopei			A sand tiger shark.	
Carcharias	C. teretidens			A sand tiger shark.	
Cretolamna	C. appendiculata			A megatooth shark.	
Echinorhinus	E. priscus			A bramble shark.	
Eugaleus	E. ypresiensis			A houndshark.	
Galeocerdo	G. latidens			A tiger shark.	
Ginglymostoma	G. africanum			A nurse shark.	
Ginglymostoma	G. subafricanum			A nurse shark.	
Hexanchus	H. sp.			A sixgill shark.	
Heterodontus	H. lerichei			A bullhead shark.	
Hypotodus	H. verticalis	Nanjemoy Creek, MD		A sand shark.	
Isistius	I. trituratus			A cookiecutter shark.	
Lamna	L. cuspidata			A relative of the porbeagle and salmon sharks.	
Nebrius	N. thielensis			A nurse shark.	
Nebrius	N. serra			A nurse shark.	
Odontaspis	O. macrota	Evergreen Plantation, VA		A sand shark.	
Odontaspis	O. winkleri			A sand shark.	
Orectolobidae	Orectolobidae indet.			A wobbegong of uncertain affinities.	
Otodus	O. obliquus	Evergreen Plantation; Fisher/Sullivan, VA		A megatooth shark.	
Otodus	O.aksuaticus	Woodstock Member		A megatooth shark.	
Pachygaleus	P. lefevrei			A houndshark.	
Palaeogaleus	P. vincebri			A houndshark.	
Palaeohypotodus	P. ratoti			A sand shark.	
Palaeorhincodon	P. wardi			A relative of the whale shark.	
Physogaleus	P. secundas			A relative of the tiger shark.	
Scyliorhinus	S. gilberti			A catshark.	
Serratolamna	S. aschersoni			A serratolamnid mackerel shark.	
Serratolamna	S. lerichei			A serratolamnid mackerel shark.	
Squatina	S. prima			An angelshark.	
Squalus	S. crenatidens			A dogfish.	
Striatolamia	S. macrota			A sand shark.	
Triakis	T. wardi			A houndshark.	

==== Rays ====
Taxon	Species	Location	Fossils	Notes	Images
Aetobatus	A. irregularis			An eagle ray.	
Aetomylaeus	A. sp.			An eagle ray.	
Anoxypristis	A. macrodens			A relative of the knifetooth sawfish.	
Anoxypristis	A. sp			A relative of the knifetooth sawfish.	
Archaeomanta	A. melenhorsti			A devil ray.	
Burnhamia	B. daviesi			A devil ray.	
Coupatezia	C. woatersi			A whiptail stingray.	
Heterotorpedo	H. fowleri			A whiptail stingray.	
Hypolophodon	H. sylvestris			A whiptail stingray.	
Jacquhermania	J. duponti			A relative of the butterfly rays.	
Meridiania	M. conyexa			A whiptail stingray.	
Myliobatis	M. latidens			An eagle ray.	
Pristis	P. lathami			A sawfish.	
Propristis	P. schweinfurthi			A sawfish.	
Rhinobatos	R. bruxelliensis			A guitarfish.	
Rhinoptera	R. sherboni			A cownose ray.	

=== Ray-finned fish ===
The paleoichthyofauna of this formation shares close similarities with better-preserved fossils of concurrent lagerstatte from Europe, most notably the London Clay and Monte Bolca.

Based on:

Taxon	Species	Location	Fossils	Notes	Images
Acipenser	A. sp.			A sturgeon.	
Aglyptorhynchus	A. venablesi			A xiphiorhynchid billfish.	
Albula	A. eppsi			A bonefish.	
Albula	A. oweni			A bonefish.	
Amia	A. sp.			A bowfin.	
?Arius	?A. sp.			A sea catfish.	
Bolcyrus	B. cf. formosissimus			A conger eel.	
Boreolates	B. debernardi			A potential latid. Previously referred to Prolates dormaalensis. Type locality of genus and species.	
Brychaetus	B. muelleri			A bonytongue.	
Cyclopoma	C. folmeri			A percomorph, potentially either a centropomoid or temperate perch. Type locality of species.	
Cylindracanthus	C. ornatus			A fish of uncertain affinities.	
Duplexdens	D. macropomum			A scombroid.	
Egertonia	E. isodonta			A phyllodontid albuliform.	
Eodiodon	E. bauzai			A porcupinefish.	
Eothynnus	E. salmoneus			A jackfish.	
Eutrichiurides	E. winkleri			A cutlassfish.	
Fisherichthys	F. folmeri			A potential drumfish. Type locality of genus and species.	
Gymnosarda	G. delheidi			A relative of the dogtooth tuna.	
Lepisosteus	L. sp.			A gar.	
Megalopidae indet.				A tarpon relative of uncertain affinities.	
Mene	M. sp.			A moonfish.	
Osteoglossinae indet.				A bonytongue reminiscent of Osteoglossum or Scleropages.	
Ostraciidae indet.	Ostraciidae taxon A			A cowfish of uncertain affinities.	
Ostraciidae indet.	Ostraciidae taxon B			A cowfish of uncertain affinities.	
Palaeocybium	P. proosti			A Spanish mackerel similar to the wahoo.	
Paralbula	P. marylandica			A phyllodontid albuliform.	
?Perciformes	?Perciformes indet.	Fisher/Sullivan, VA		A potential perciform of uncertain affinities.	
Phyllodus	P. toliapicus			A phyllodontid albuliform.	
Platylaemus	P. colei			A wrasse.	
Pycnodus	P. sp.			A pycnodont.	
Rhineastes	R. peltatus			A catfish.	
cf. Sciaenurus	cf. S. bowerbanki			A seabream.	
Scomberomorus	S. bleekeri			A Spanish mackerel.	
Scomberomorus	S. stormsi			A Spanish mackerel.	
Scomberomorus	S. sp.			A Spanish mackerel.	
Scombramphodon	S. sp.			A scombroid.	
Seriola	S. sp.			An amberjack.	
Sphyraena	S. bogornensis			A barracuda.	
Sullivanichthys	S. mccloskeyi			A bluefish. Type locality of genus and species.	
Teratichthys	T. antiquitatus			A jackfish.	
Trichiurides	T. sagittidens			A cutlassfish.	
Triodon	T. antiquus			A relative of the threetooth puffer.	
Voltaconger	V. latispinus			A conger eel.	
Wettonius	W. sp.			A veliferid lampriform.	
Xiphiorhynchus	X. homalorhamphus			A xiphiorhynchid billfish.	

Many invertebrates (such as gastropods, bivalves, corals, and bryozoans) have also been reported from the Nanjemoy Formation.

== Paleoflora ==
Based on Weems & Grimsley (1999):

Flora of the Nanjemoy formation
Species	Locality	Material	Notes
Canarium parksii			
Iodes multireticulata			
Nipa burtini			
Premontria degremonti			
Symplocos grimsleyi			
Tinospora folmerii			
Wetherellia marylandica			
cf. Coturnipes cooperi			
Ampelopsis sp.			
Nyssa sp.			
Vitis sp.			
?Beckettia sp.			

== See also ==
Regional geology

- List of fossiliferous stratigraphic units in Maryland, Virginia
- Geology of the Chesapeake Bay, Appalachians
- Chesapeake Bay impact crater

Paleontology

- North American land mammal ages
  - Bumbanian, Casamayoran, Mangaorapan, Waipawan
- Paleontology in Maryland, Virginia
- Princeton Chert
- Barylambda
