= Salisbury Embayment =

Prehistoric sea (65–5mya) over the United States' East Coast

Coordinates: 38.68°N 75.70°W

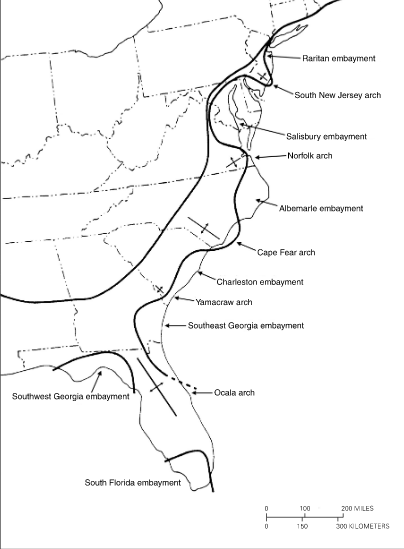
Basins and arches of the Atlantic Coastal Plain, including the Salisbury Embayment

The Salisbury Embayment was an arm of the Atlantic Ocean which covered what is now Delaware, southern and eastern Maryland, the Virginia Peninsula and parts of southern New Jersey during Paleogene and Neogene times, from about 65 million to 5 million years ago. Sea level throughout most of this period stood several hundred feet higher than at present, and deposition of sediments draining off the continent possibly caused the underlying rocks to sink down, creating the embayment. The shore of the embayment lay inland at the present-day Fall Line in the region. Throughout the Paleogene and Neogene times, sediment accumulated on the floor of the Salisbury Embayment during pulses of high sea level, forming the Paleocene Aquia and Brightseat Formations, the Eocene Pamunkey Group, and the Miocene Chesapeake Group. There are no deposits from the Oligocene epoch due to a drop in sea level, however, a 2- to 3- mile diameter meteorite or asteroid is thought to have left a 50-mile diameter crater upon impact in the southern Chesapeake Bay.

When sea levels fell as the Pleistocene ice ages took hold, the thousands of feet of sediment layers in the Salisbury Embayment were exposed as the Coastal Plain terrains of Delaware, Maryland and eastern Virginia.
