= Aquia Formation =

Geologic formation in the United States

- Stratigraphic range: Late Paleocene; ~59.0–55.5 Ma
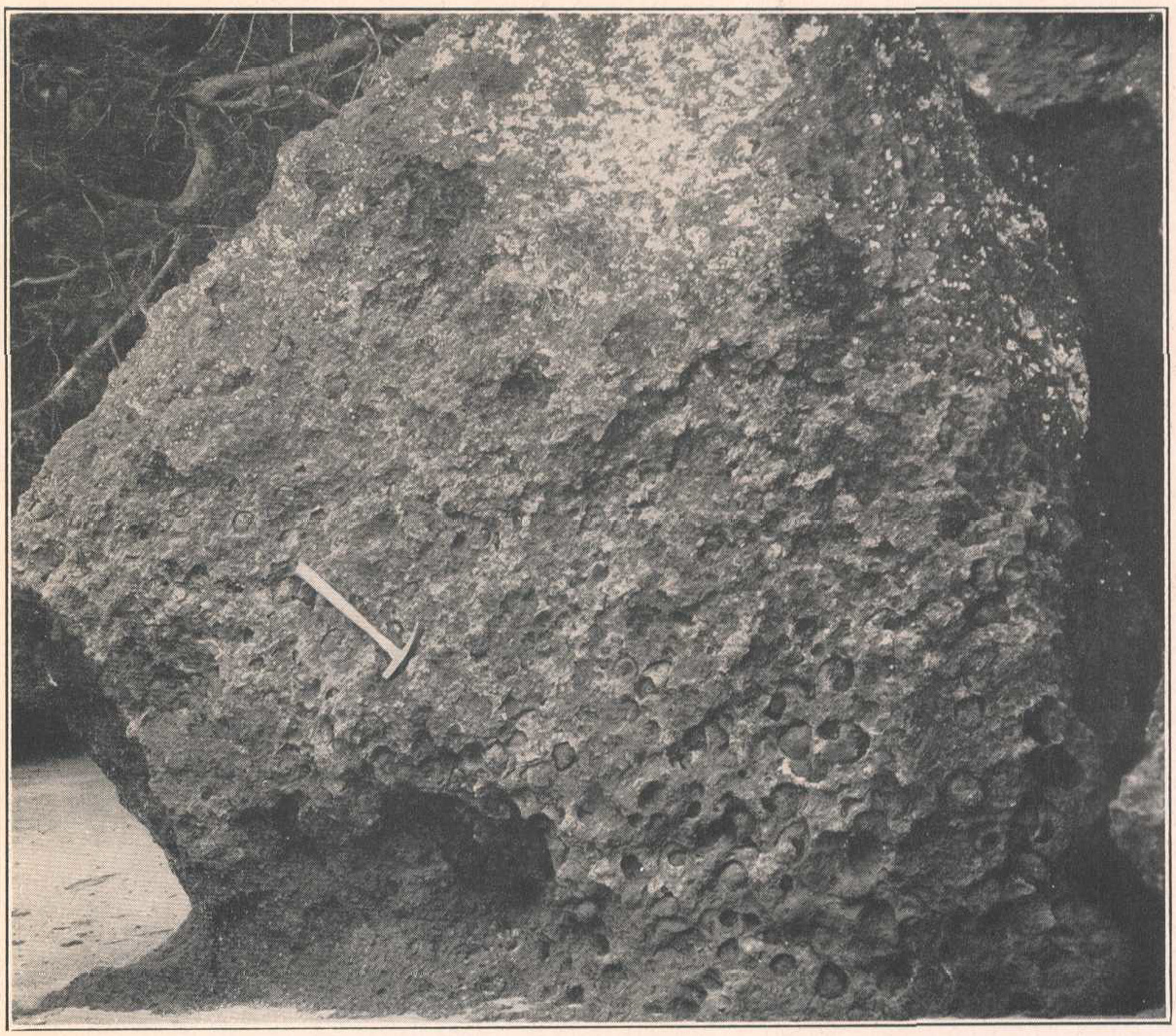
- Boulder of Aquia Formation along Chester River. Contains casts of large mollusks. (c. 1917)
- Type: Geological formation
- Unit of: Pamunkey Group
- Sub-units: Paspotansa & Piscataway Members
- Underlies: Nanjemoy Formation
- Overlies: Brightseat Formation
- Thickness: up to 100 feet (30 m)

Lithology
- Primary: Sandstone

Location
- Location: Hopewell, Virginia
- Coordinates: 38.3°N 77.3°W
- Approximate paleocoordinates: 39.0°N 58.9°W
- Region: Maryland, New Jersey, Virginia
- Country: United States
- Extent: Upper Chesapeake Bay-James River

Type section
- Named for: Aquia Creek

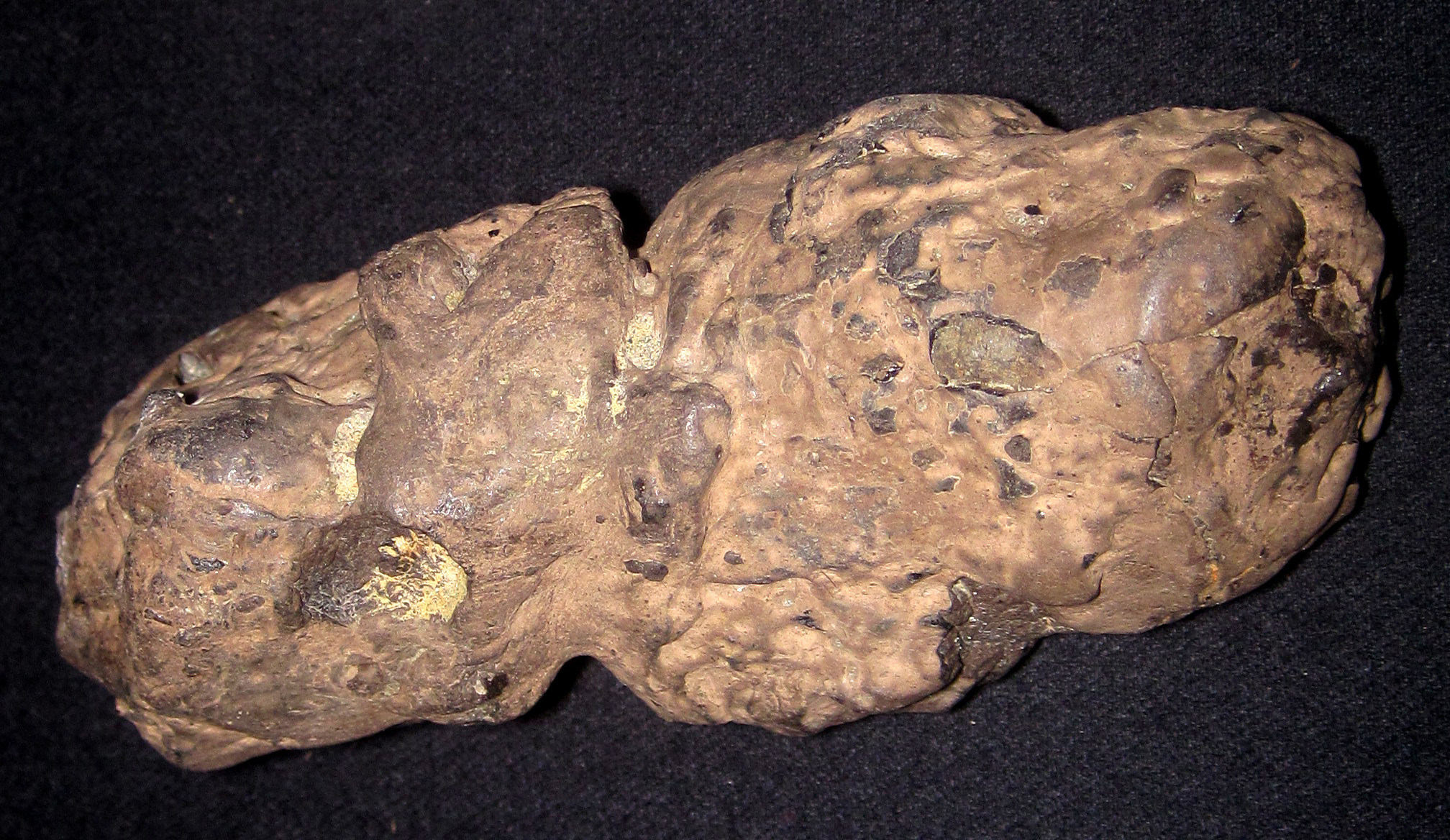
Thecachampsa crocodile coprolite from Aquia Formation, King George County, Virginia)

The Aquia Formation is a geologic sandstone formation that extends from the upper Chesapeake Bay to the James River near Hopewell, Virginia. It consists of clayey, silty, very shelly, glauconitic sand. Fossil records indicate that this stratigraphic unit was created during the Paleocene.

The Aquia formation was named for Aquia Creek where it is exposed in cliff faces along the banks.

== Geology ==
=== Lithology ===
When uncovered, it appears dark green to gray-green, argillaceous, with well sorted fine- to medium-grained sand and locally indurated shell beds. It is between 0 and 100 feet thick in Maryland. Quartz and phosphatic pebbles and/or very coarse glauconitic quartz sand mark the base of the unit. A few hard streaks of shells or thin "rock" layers are often reported but appear to be more abundant in the sections south of the James River.

=== Stratigraphy ===
The Aquia formation is overlain by the Nanjemoy Formation and overlies the Brightseat Formation.

The Aquia formation is broken down into two members: the lower Piscataway member and upper Paspotansa member.

== Age ==
The Aquia Formation is thought to be 59.0-55.5 million years old. The Piscataway member is 59–56.25 million years old, and the Paspotansa member is 56–55.5 million years old. This is the Paleocene period.

Older publications describe the Aquia as being of Eocene age.

== Vertebrate paleobiota ==
=== Bony fish ===
Bony fish from the Aquia Formation
Genus	Species	Material	Notes	Images
Lepisosteus	L.sp.		A Gar fish	
Ostracion	O. meretrix		An ostraciid (boxfish)	
Phyllodus	P.sp.		A bonefish	
Scomberomorus	S.sp.		A mackrel fish	
Labridae	Labridae indet.		A wrasse	

=== Chondrichthyes ===
==== Sharks ====
Sharks from the Aquia Formation
Genus	Species	Material	Notes	Images
Abdounia	A.beaugei		A reqium shark	
Anomotodon	A.novus		A goblin shark	
Carcharias	C.hopei		A sand tiger shark	
Cretolamna	C.appendiculata		A megatooth shark	
Delpitoscyllium	D.africanum			
Foumtizia	F.abdouni			
Galeorhinus	G.sp.		A houndshark	
Ginglymostoma	G.subafricanum		A nurse shark	
Heterodontus	H.lerichei		A bullhead shark	
Hypotodus	H.verticalis			
Isurolamna	I.inflata		A mackrel shark	
Megasqualus	M.orpiensis			
Notidanodon	N.loozi		A cow shark	
Odontaspis	O.loozi			
Orectolobiform	O. Indet.			
Otodus	O.obliquus		A Megatooth shark	
Pachygaleus	P.lefevrei			
Palaeogaleus	P.sp.			
Paleocarcharodon	P.orientalis		A megatooth shark	
Paleohypotodus	P.rutoti			
Paraorthacodus	P.clarkii		A Paraorthacodontid shark	
Physogaleus	P.secundus		A reqium shark	
Premontreia	P.subulidens			
Scyliorhinus	S.sp.		A Scyliorhinid shark	
Squalus	S.sp.		A dogfish	
Squatina	S.prima		An Angel shark	
Striatolamia	S.macrota		A Sand shark	
Striatolamia	S.striata		A Sand shark	
Triakis	T.sp.		A Houndshark	

==== Rays ====
Rays from the Aquia Formation
Genus	Species	Material	Notes	Images
Myliobatis	M.sp.		A Mylobatiform ray	
Burnhamia	B.sp.		A devil ray	
Coupatezia	C. soutersi		A dasyatid ray	
Dasyatis	D.sp		A dasyatid ray	
Hypolophodon	H.sylvestris			
Ischyodus	I. sylvestris			

=== Birds ===
Birds from the Aquia Formation
Genus	Species	Material	Notes	Images
Presbyornis	P. isoni	Humerus & alar phalanx	A giant presbyornithid waterfowl.	
?Prophaeton	?P. sp.	Distal end of right humerus	A potential prophaetontid phaetontiform.	

=== Reptiles ===
==== Crocodylomorphs ====
Crocodylomorphs from the Aquia Formation
Genus	Species	Material	Notes	Images
Eosuchus	E. minor		A eusuchian crocodylomorph.	
?Hyposaurus	H. sp.	Teeth	A potential dyrosaurid.	
Thoracosaurus	T. neocesariensis		A eusuchian crocodylomorph.	

==== Turtles ====
Based on Weems (2014):

Turtles from the Aquia Formation
Genus	Species	Material	Notes	Images
Aspideretoides	A. virginianus		A softshell turtle. Type locality of species.	
Bothremydinae indet.			A marine side-necked turtle of uncertain affinities.	
Catapleura	C. coatesi		A pancheloniid sea turtle. Type locality of species.	
Eosphargis	E. insularis		A dermochelyid sea turtle.	
Euclastes	E. roundsi		A pancheloniid sea turtle. Type locality of species.	
Kinosternoidea indet.			A kinosternoid turtle of uncertain affinities.	
Osteopygis	O. kranzi		A freshwater macrobaenid turtle. Type locality of species.	
Planetochelys	P. savoiei		A planetochelyid trionychian. Type locality of genus and species.	
Tasbacka	T. ruhoffi		A pancheloniid sea turtle. Type locality of species.	

==== Squamates ====
Squamates from the Aquia Formation
Genus	Species	Material	Notes	Images
Palaeophis	P. virginianus		A marine palaeophiid snake. Type locality of species.	

=== Mammals ===
Based on Rose (2000):

Mammals from the Aquia Formation
Genus	Species	Material	Notes	Images
Arctocyonidae indet.			An arctocyonid of uncertain affinities.	
Ectoganus	E. cf. gliriformis		A taeniodont.	
?Phenacodus	?P. sp.		A phenacodont.	

== Invertebrate paleobiota ==
=== Molluscs ===
==== Gastropods ====
Gastropods from the Aquia Formation
Genus	Species	Material	Notes	Images
Turritella	T.sp.		very commonly found in the formation	
Pleurotoma	P.potomacensis			

==== Bivalves ====
Bivalves from the Aquia Formation
Genus	Species	Material	Notes	Images
Crassatelites	C.alaeformis			
Cucullaea	C.gigantea			
Dosiniopsis	D.lenticularis			
Meretrix (bivalve)	M.ovata			
Modiolus (bivalve)	M.alabamensis			
Ostrea	O.compressirostra			
Panopea	P.elongata			
Venericardia	V.planicosta			
Vulsella	V.alabamensis			

==== Cephalopods ====
Sharks from the Aquia Formation
Genus	Species	Material	Notes	Images
Cimomia	C.marylandensis		Uncommonly found	

Mammal and bird fossils are also uncommonly found in the formation.

== See also ==
- List of fossiliferous stratigraphic units in Virginia
- Paleontology in Virginia
- Aquia Creek sandstone
- Public Quarry at Government Island
