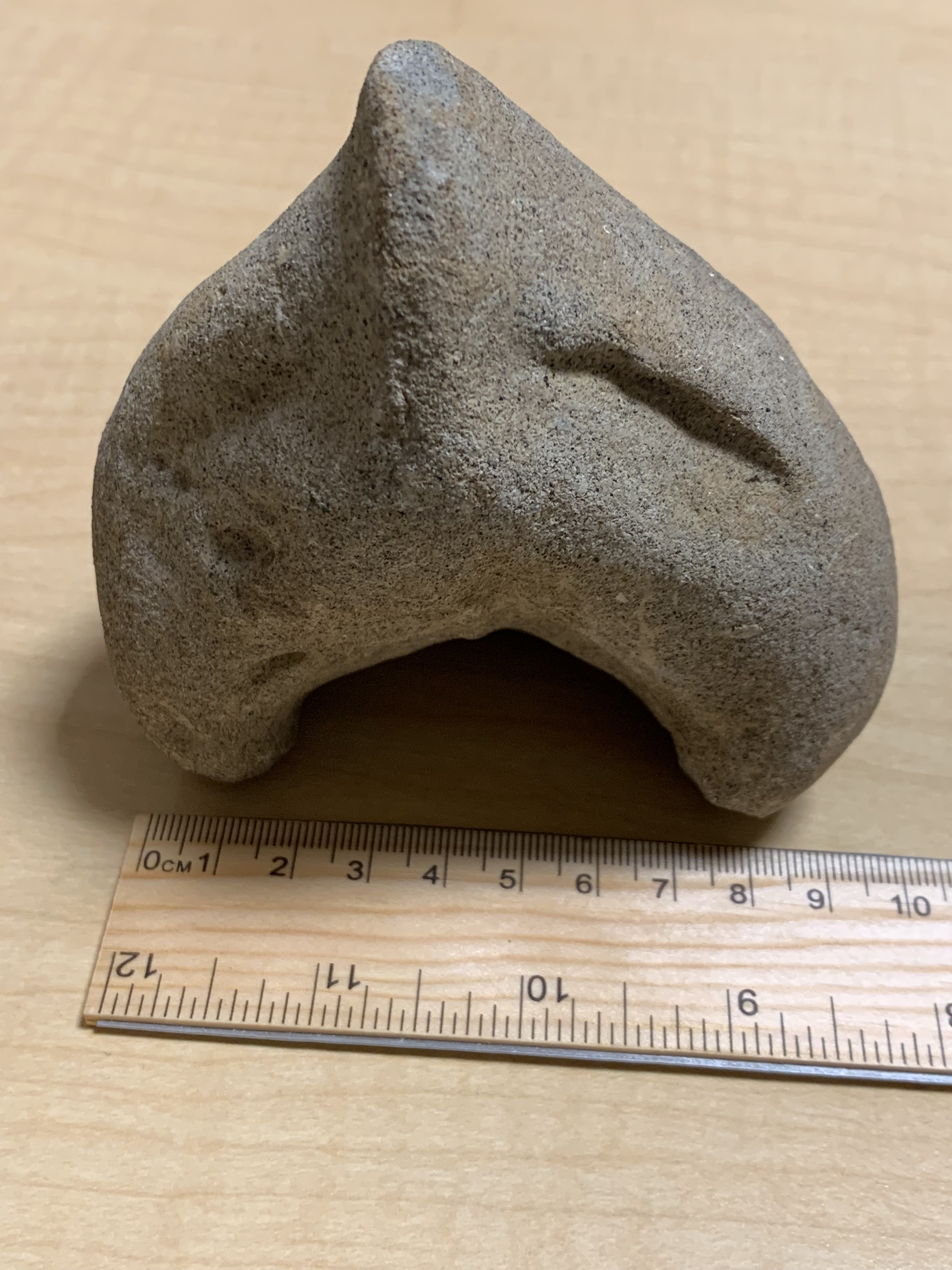
- Fossilized false ark shell clam from Maryland, USA

Scientific classification
- Domain: Eukaryota
- Kingdom: Animalia
- Phylum: Mollusca
- Class: Bivalvia
- Order: Arcida
- Family: Cucullaeidae
- Genus: Cucullaea
- Species: C. gigantea

Binomial name
- Cucullaea gigantea T.A. Conrad 1862

= Cucullaea gigantea =

Extinct species of bivalve

Cucullaea gigantea is an extinct species of false ark shell found in the United States, in the Aquia Formation in Maryland and Virginia along the Potomac River and its tributaries, and in Alabama. They flourished in marine environments during the Paleocene, ranging from 58.7 to 55.8 million years ago.

Cucullaea gigantea average about 8–14 cm in length, about twice the size of its relative Cucullaea recendens which average 5–8 cm.

Cucullaea were infaunal suspension feeders, meaning they burrowed into the seafloor and strained their food from the water.

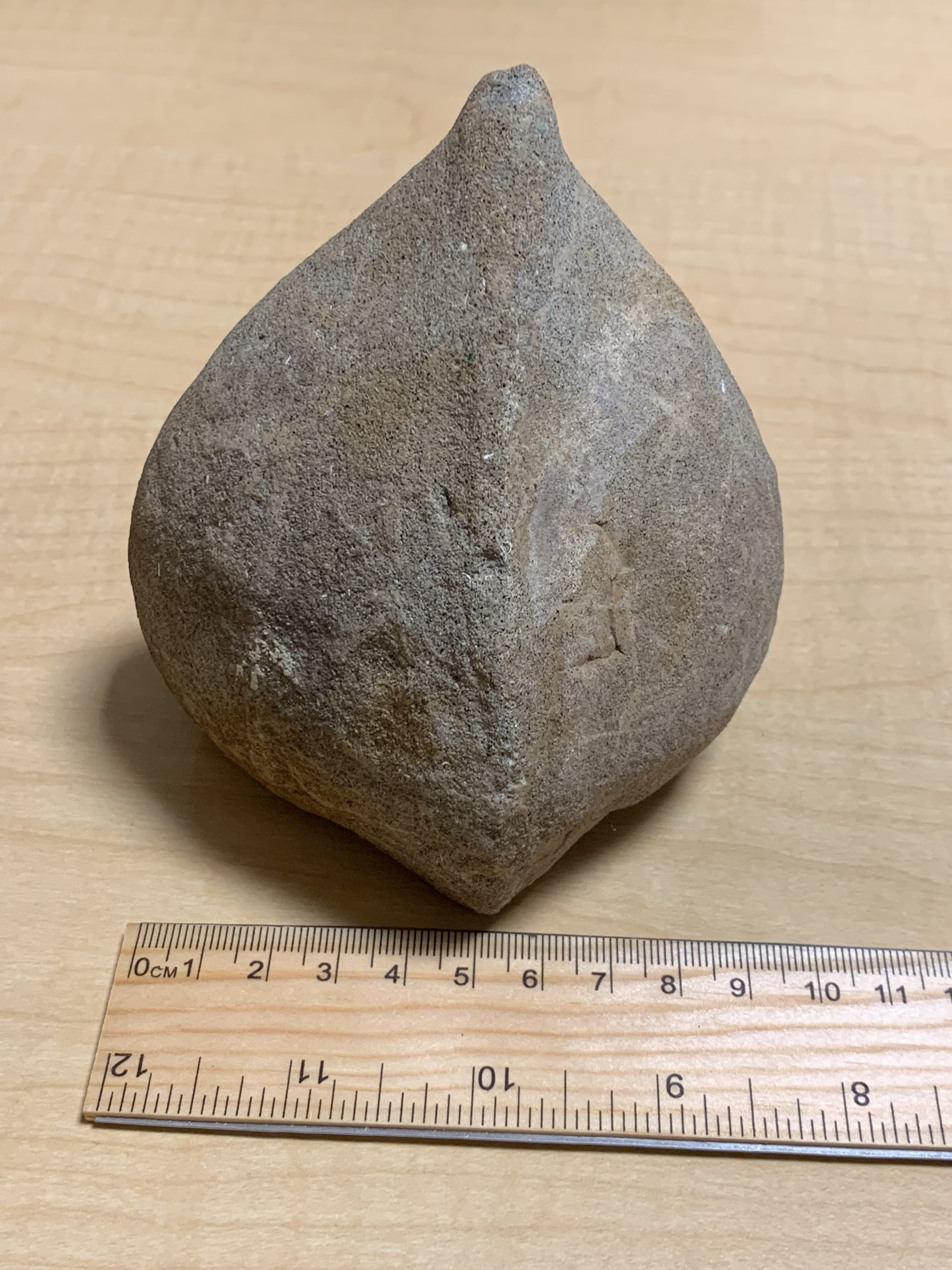
Fossilized false ark shell clam from Maryland, USA

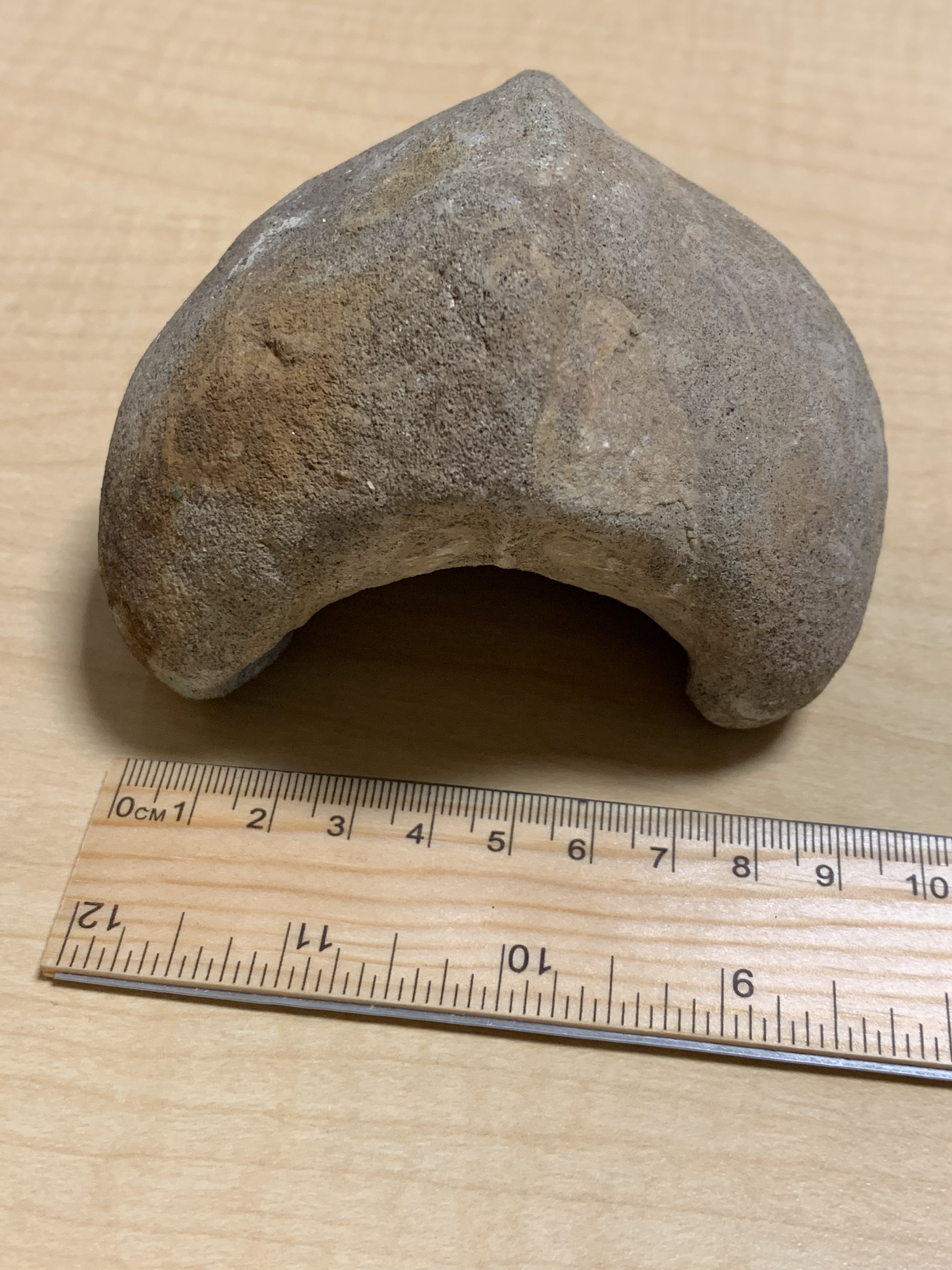
Fossilized false ark shell clam from Maryland, USA

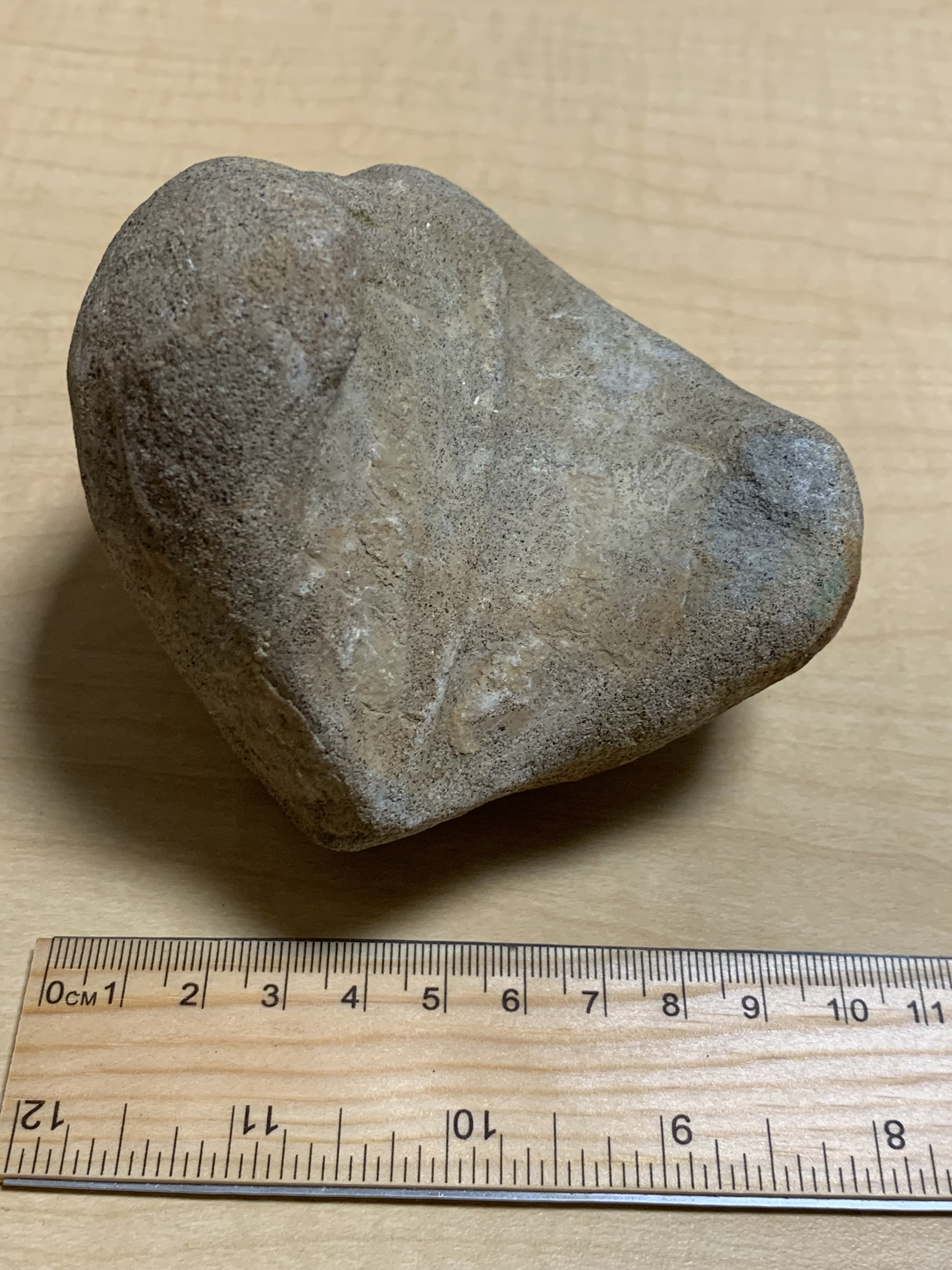
Fossilized false ark shell clam from Maryland, USA
