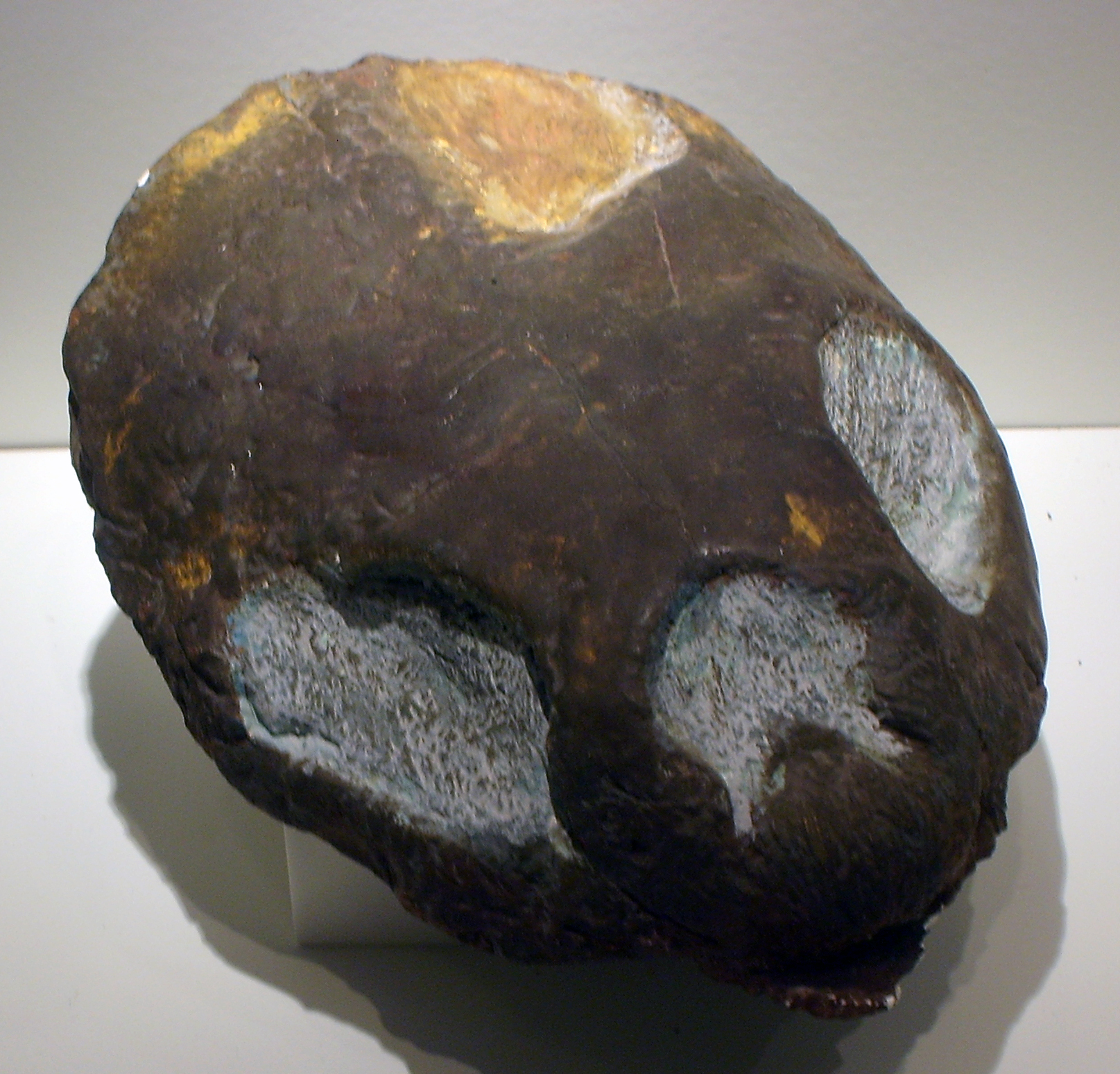
- Eosphargis breineri skull cast at the University of Copenhagen Geological Museum

Scientific classification
- Kingdom: Animalia
- Phylum: Chordata
- Class: Reptilia
- Order: Testudines
- Suborder: Cryptodira
- Family: Dermochelyidae
- Genus: †Eosphargis; Lydekker, 1889

Species
- †E. breineri Nielsen, 1959; †E. gigas (Owen, 1880); †E. insularis (Cope, 1872)

Synonyms
- †Anglocetus Tarlo, 1964; †Lembonax Cope, 1872

= Eosphargis =

Eosphargis Temporal range: Late Paleocene to Early Eocene, 59–51.5 Ma

Extinct genus of turtles

Eosphargis (from Greek eos, meaning "dawn", and sphargis, the Greek word for the leatherback turtle) is an extinct genus of sea turtles from the late Paleocene and early Eocene of western Europe and eastern North America. It is a member of the family Dermochelyidae, which also includes the modern leatherback sea turtle (Dermochelys coriacea), of which it is the earliest known definitive member.

== Taxonomy ==
The genus Eosphargis was first described by British paleontologist Richard Lydekker in 1889. It contains three known species:

The following species are known:

- †E. breineri Nielsen, 1959 - Early Eocene of Denmark (Fur Formation)
- †E. gigas (Owen, 1880) - Early Eocene of England (London Clay), potentially Maryland, US (Nanjemoy Formation)
- †E. insularis (Cope, 1872) - Late Paleocene of New Jersey, US (Vincentown Formation) and Virginia, US (Aquia Formation)

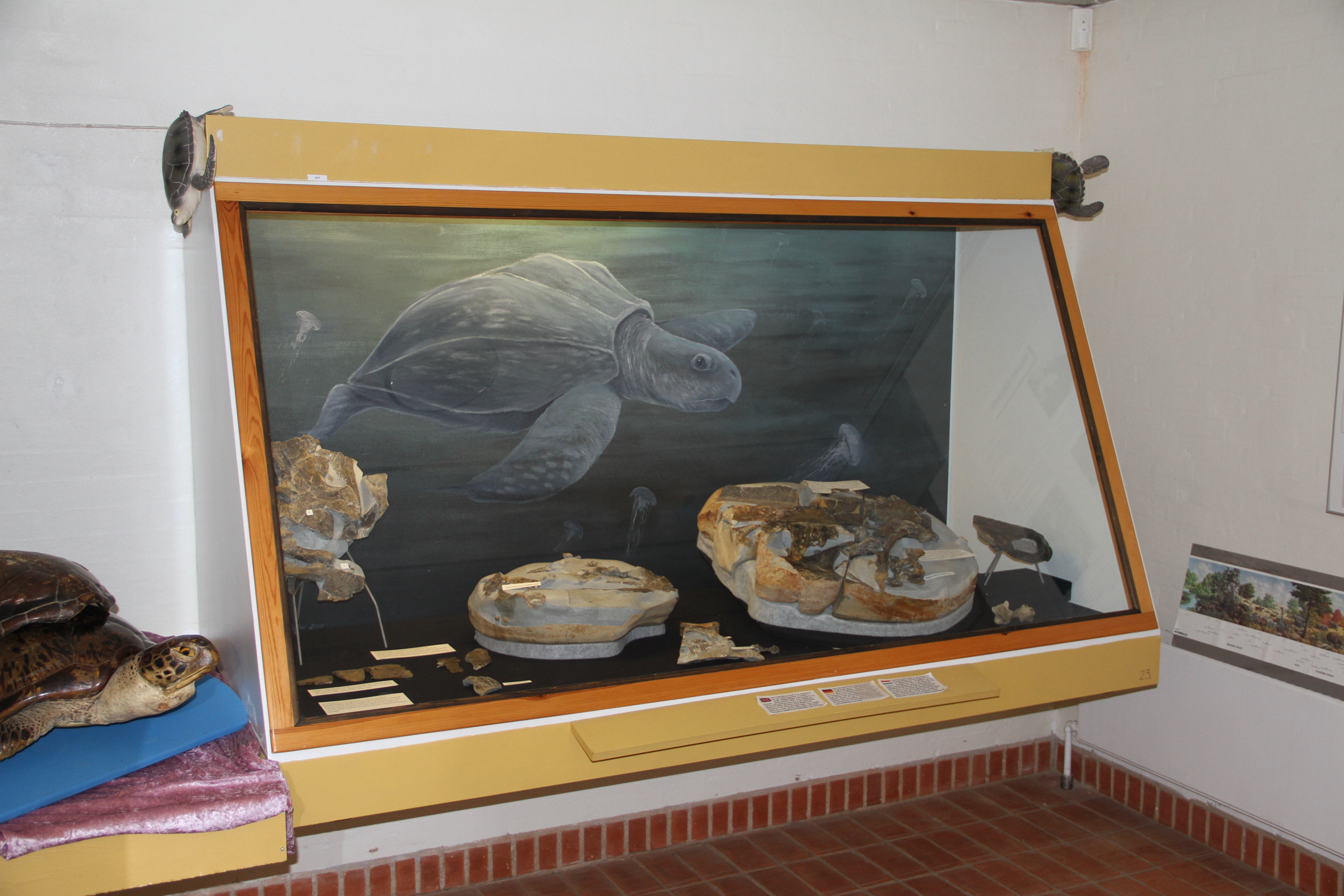
Display of fossil E. breineri material at the Fur Museum

It is possible that E. insularis is conspecific with one of the two other known species, as it is known from only fragmentary material. It was excluded from a 2025 taxonomic review for this reason. E. breineri is known from the Fur Formation lagerstatte of Denmark, and is thus the species with the best-preserved remains.

In 1964, an alleged record of a scapula from an early archaeocete whale from the London Clay was described as †Anglocetus beatsoni Tarlo, 1964. This would have been one of the earliest known whales, and one of the only known from the Eocene of Europe. However, a later analysis found this bone to likely belong to an individual of E. gigas.
