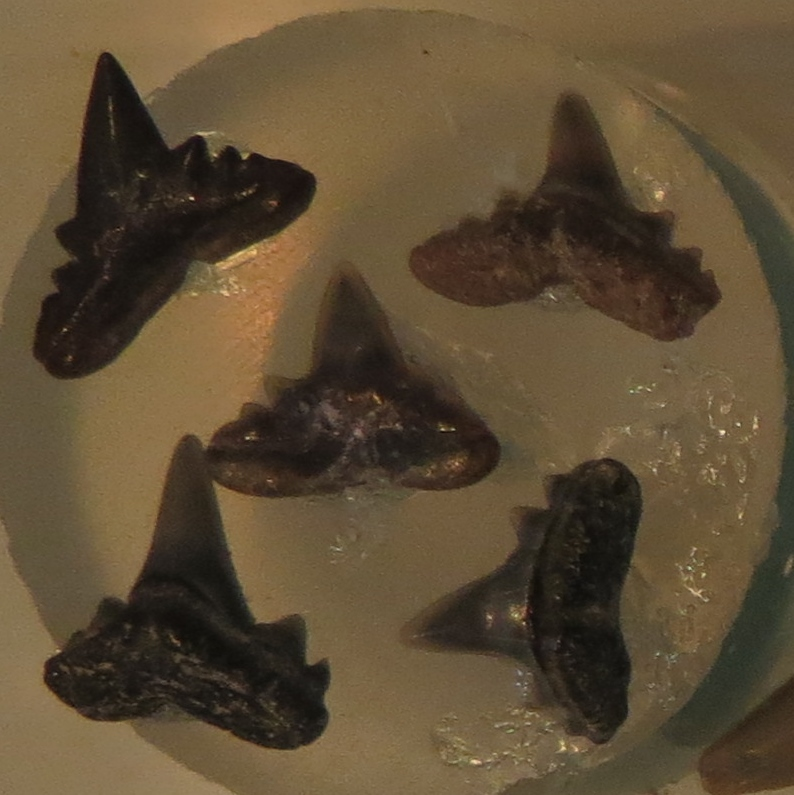
- Abdounia beaugei teeth

Scientific classification
- Kingdom: Animalia
- Phylum: Chordata
- Class: Chondrichthyes
- Subclass: Elasmobranchii
- Division: Selachii
- Order: Carcharhiniformes
- Family: Carcharhinidae
- Genus: †Abdounia
- Species: †A. beaugei

Binomial name
- †Abdounia beaugei (Arambourg, 1935)

= Abdounia beaugei =

Abdounia beaugei Temporal range: Paleocene, 66–56 Ma

Extinct requiem shark

Abdounia beaugei is an extinct species of requiem shark from the Paleocene and Eocene epochs of the Paleogene period. It is primarily known from fossil teeth, which can be found in North Africa, Europe, and North America.
