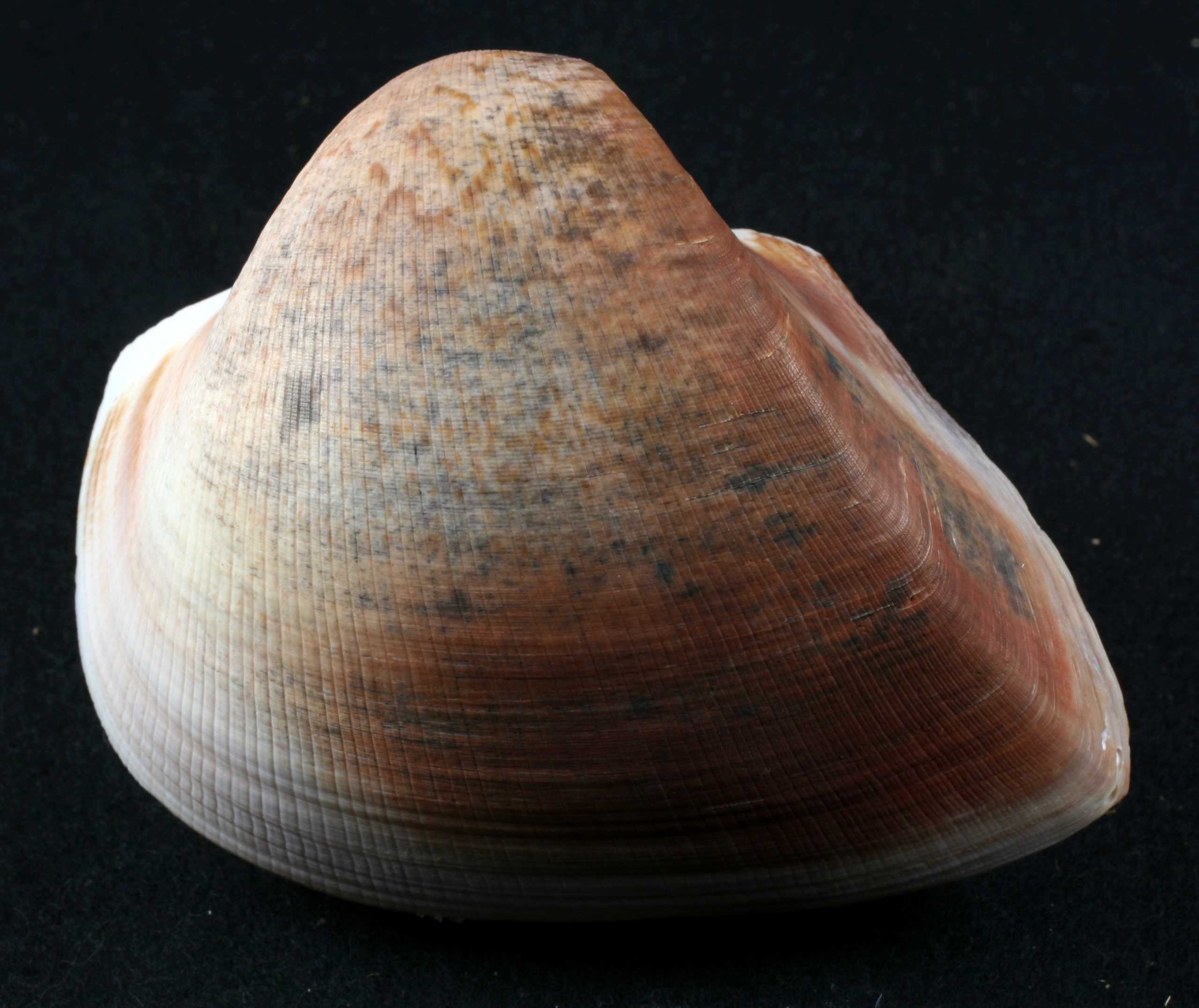

Scientific classification
- Kingdom: Animalia
- Phylum: Mollusca
- Class: Bivalvia
- Order: Arcida
- Family: Cucullaeidae
- Genus: Cucullaea
- Species: C. labiata

Binomial name
- Cucullaea labiata (Lightfoot, 1786)

= Cucullaea labiata =

Species of bivalve

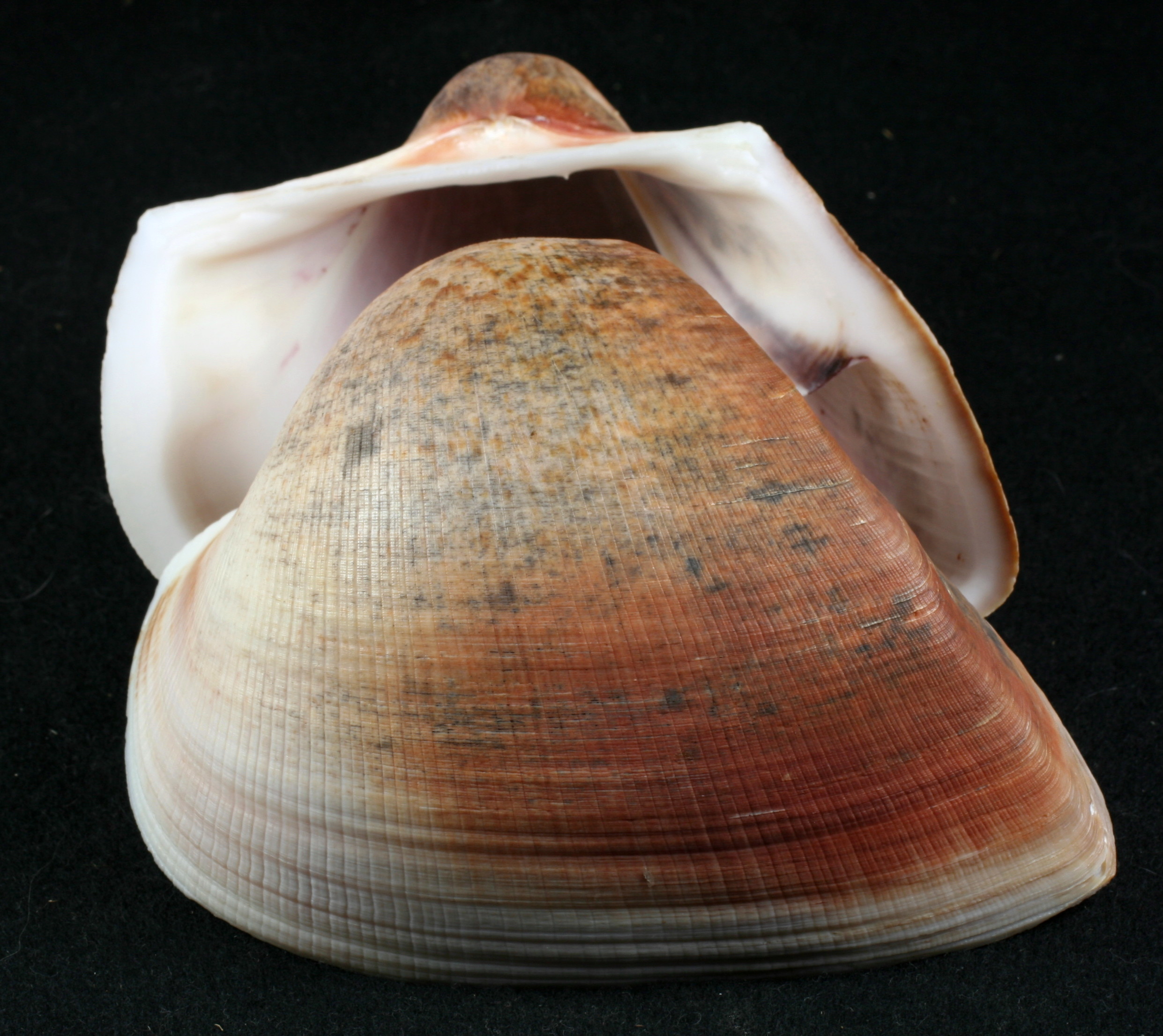
View of both valves of Cucullaea labiata (Lightfoot, 1786)

Cucullaea labiata is a species of saltwater clam or ark shell, a marine bivalve mollusk in the family Cucullaeidae.

== Description ==
The shell of Cucullea labiata is inequilateral and inequivalve, and is thin but not brittle. It grows to about 10 centimetres (3.9 in) in length though 6 centimetres (2.4 in) is a more usual size. The left valve is a little larger than the right and the shape is roughly triangular with a long, rounded margin. The umbo is prominent and slightly nearer the posterior end of the shell. It is on the summit of a triangular cardinal area which has fine sculptured ribs. The rest of the valve has further fine ribs but also concentric sculpturing giving it a reticulated pattern. The black ligament is exterior and the hinge is long and straight. It bears a row of teeth that diverge outwards and a few long teeth at the ends that are nearly horizontal. The exterior of the shell is purplish-brown and the inside white, shaded with reddish-brown posteriorly. The pallial line is faint and there is no pallial sinus. The two adductor scars are asymmetrical. The periostracum is yellowish, velvety and conspicuous and covers the outer surface of the valves.

Right and left valve of the same specimen:

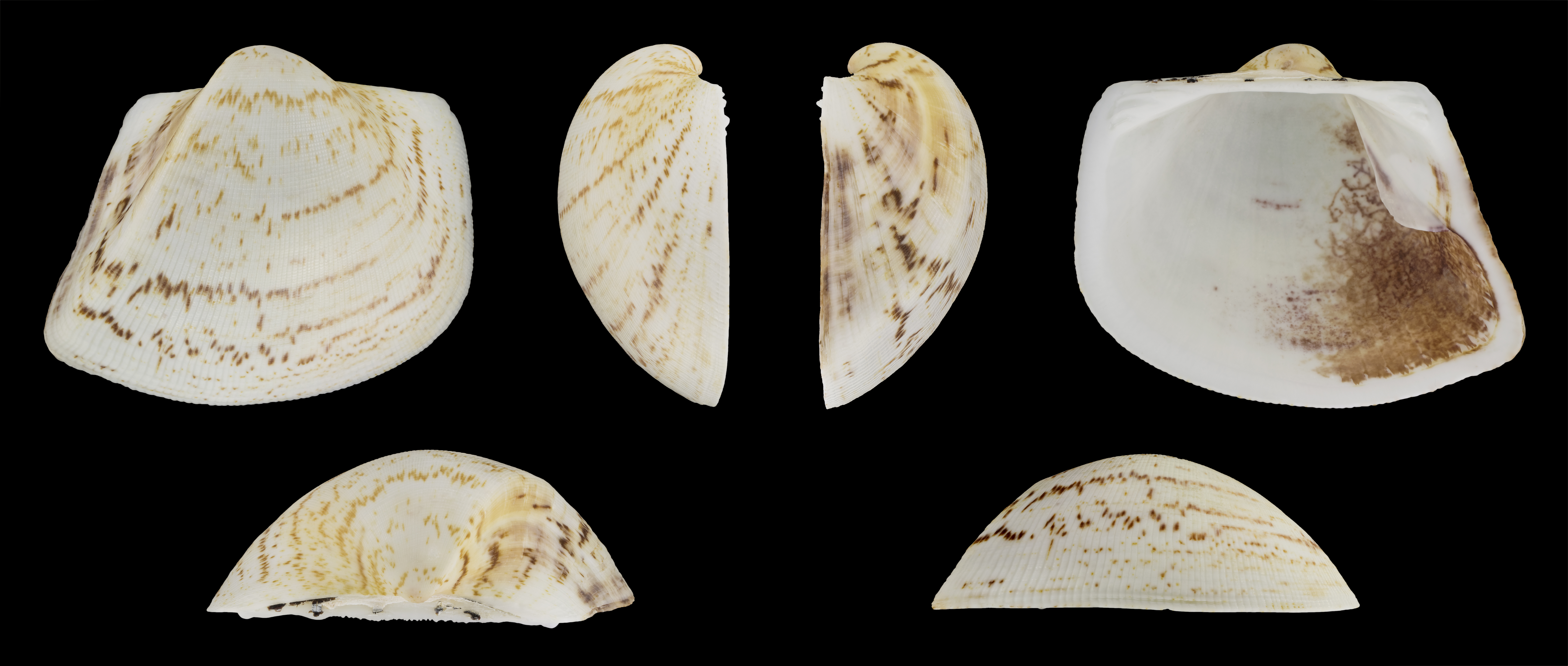
Right valve

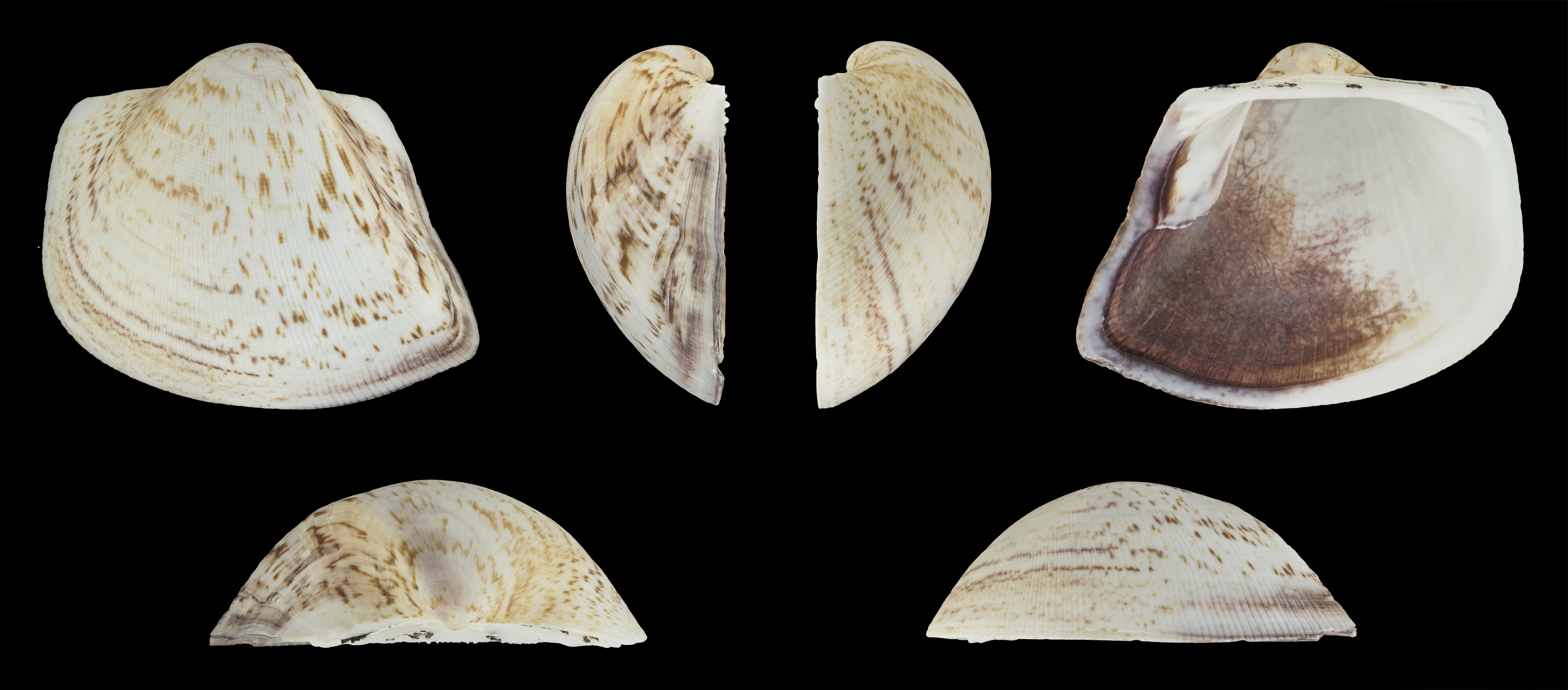
Left valve

== Distribution and habitat ==
Cucullea labiata is found in the Indo-Pacific, from northern India to Japan and New South Wales in Australia. It is found buried in sandy or muddy substrates.
