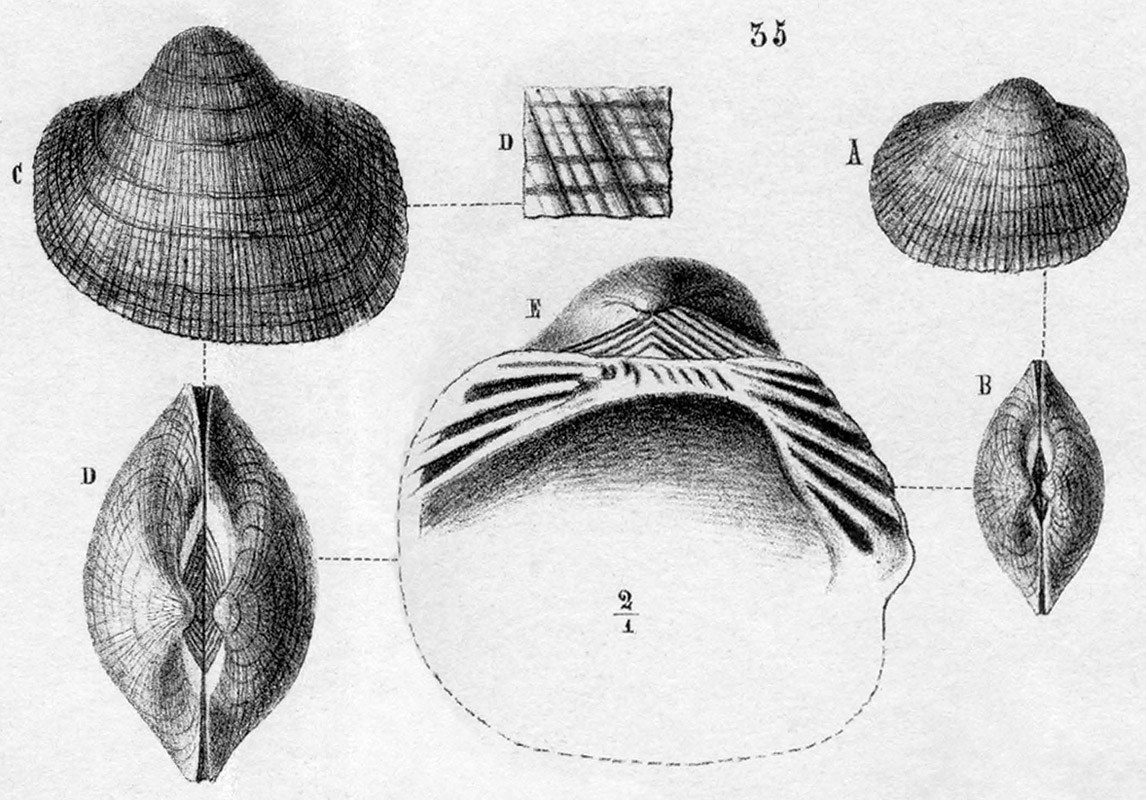

Scientific classification
- Domain: Eukaryota
- Kingdom: Animalia
- Phylum: Mollusca
- Class: Bivalvia
- Order: Arcida
- Family: Cucullaeidae
- Genus: Cucullaea
- Species: C. elegans

Binomial name
- Cucullaea elegans (Fischer) Roemer, 1836

= Cucullaea elegans =

Extinct species of bivalve

Cucullaea elegans is an extinct species of false ark shells from the North of Germany.
