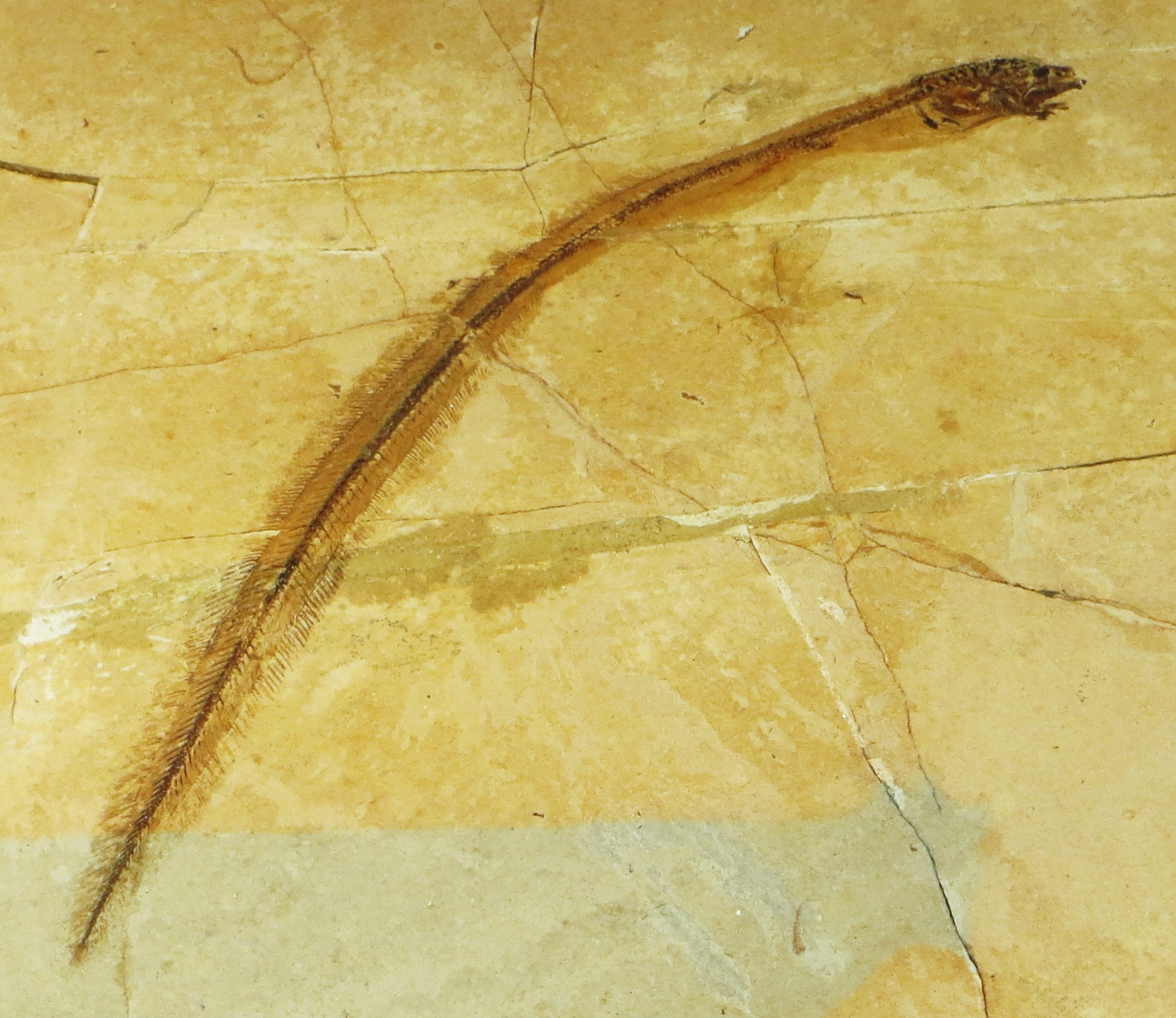
- B. bajai from Civico Museo Archeologico, Italy

Scientific classification
- Kingdom: Animalia
- Phylum: Chordata
- Class: Actinopterygii
- Order: Anguilliformes
- Family: Congridae
- Genus: †Bolcyrus; Blot, 1978

Species
- B. bajai Blot, 1978; B. formosissimus (Eastman, 1905)

Synonyms
- Eomyrus; Sphagebranchus

= Bolcyrus =

Bolcyrus Temporal range: Early Eocene

Extinct genus of prehistoric marine eel

Bolcyrus is an extinct genus of prehistoric marine eel that lived during the Early Eocene. It was a member of the family Congridae, which also contains modern conger eels.

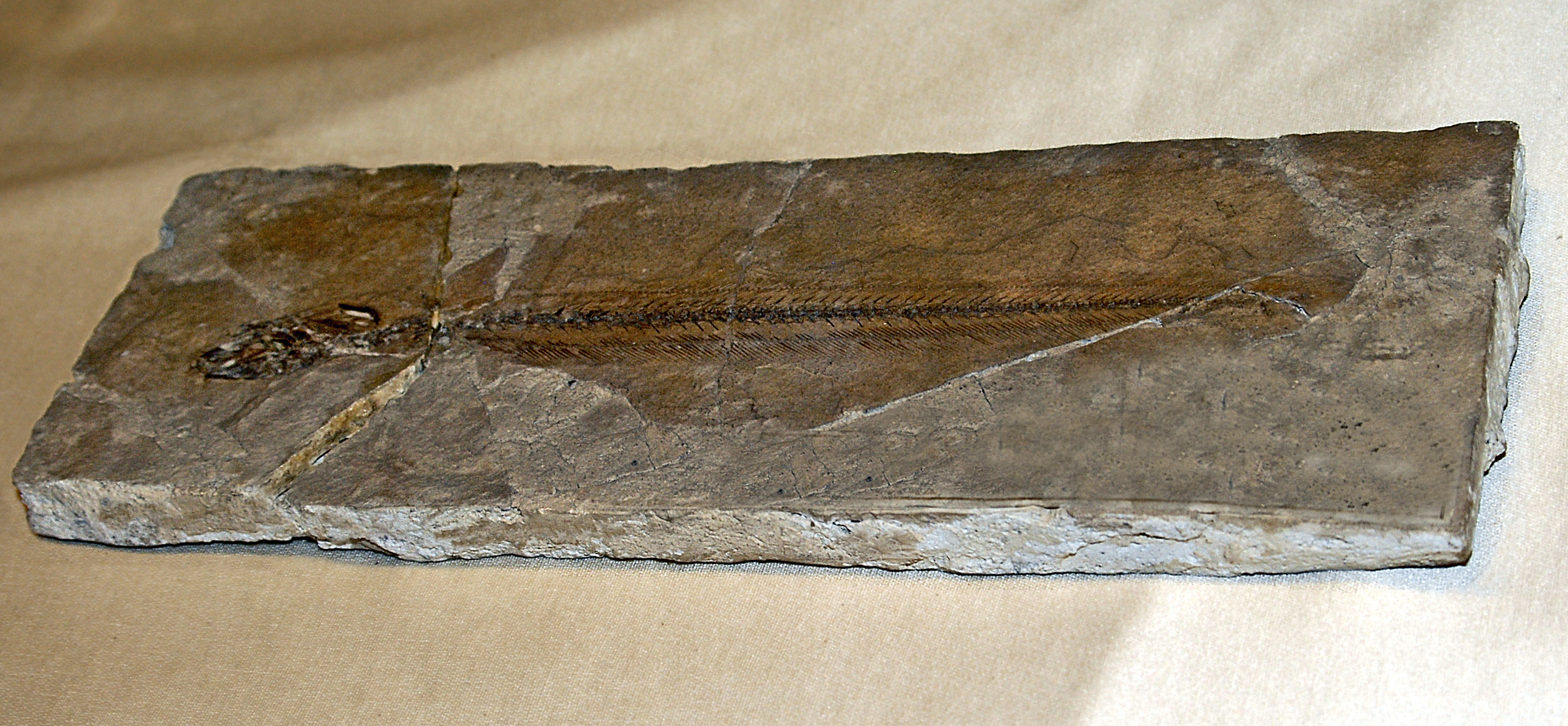
Fossil of Bolcyrus formosissimus from Monte Bolca

It contains two species:

- Bolcyrus bajai Blot, 1978 – Late Ypresian of Italy (Monte Bolca)
- Bolcyrus formosissimus (Eastman, 1905) – Late Ypresian of Italy and possibly earlier Ypresian of Virginia, US (Nanjemoy Formation)

== See also ==
- Prehistoric fish
- List of prehistoric bony fish
