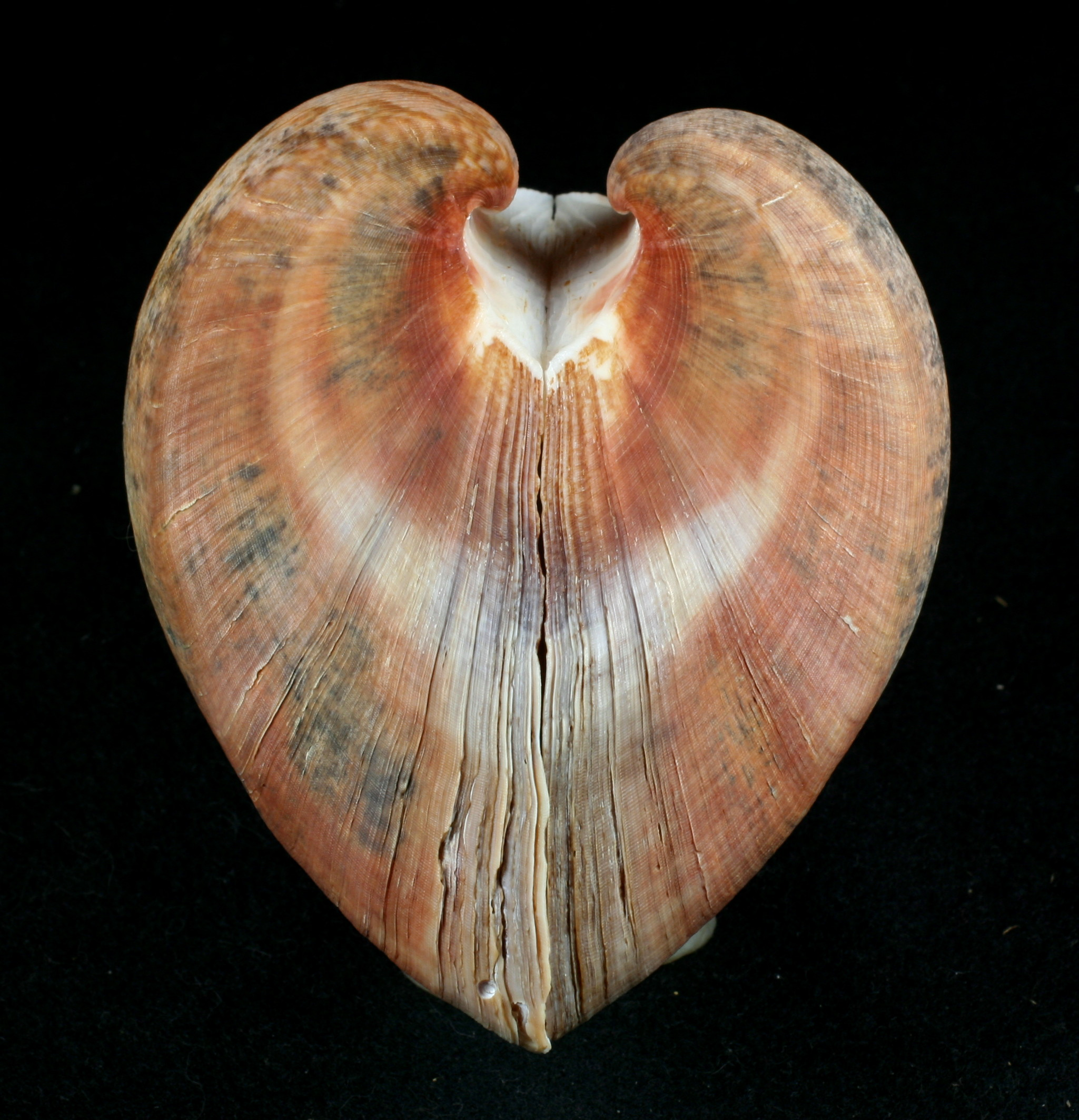
- View of umbones of Cucullaea labiata

Scientific classification
- Kingdom: Animalia
- Phylum: Mollusca
- Class: Bivalvia
- Order: Arcida
- Superfamily: Arcoidea
- Family: Cucullaeidae; Stewart 1930
- Genus: Cucullaea; Lamarck, 1801

Species
- See text

Synonyms
- Cuculina Rafinesque, 1815

= False ark shell =

Genus of molluscs

The false ark shells (Cucullaea) are a small genus of marine bivalve molluscs related to the ark clams. The genus is the only member of the family Cucullaeidae.

== Species ==
The World Register of Marine Species lists the following species:

- †Cucullaea elegans (Fischer)
- †Cucullaea gigantea Conrad, 1862
- Cucullaea granulosa Jonas, 1846
- Cucullaea labiata Lightfoot, 1786)
- Cucullaea petita Iredale, 1939
- Cucullaea vaga Iredale, 1930
