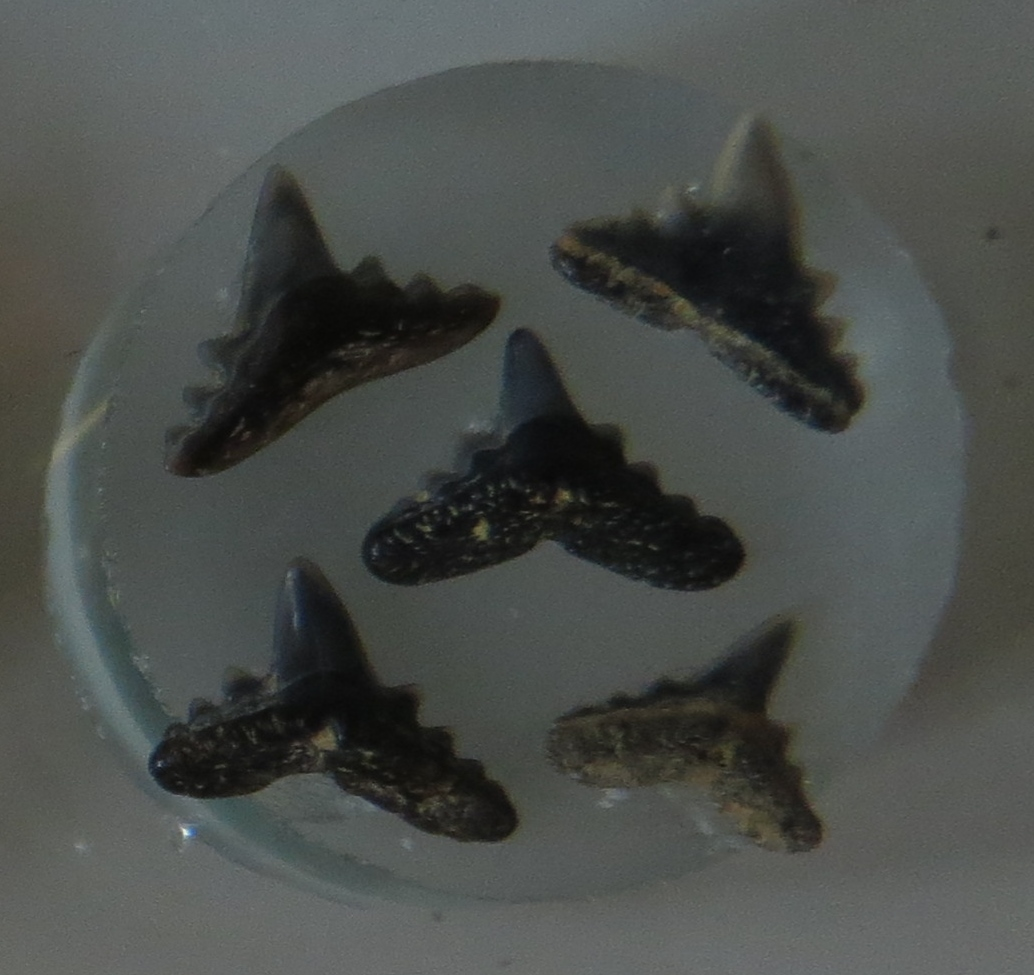

Scientific classification
- Kingdom: Animalia
- Phylum: Chordata
- Class: Chondrichthyes
- Subclass: Elasmobranchii
- Division: Selachii
- Order: Carcharhiniformes
- Family: Carcharhinidae
- Genus: †Abdounia
- Species: †A. recticona

Binomial name
- †Abdounia recticona Winkler, 1873

= Abdounia recticona =

Abdounia recticona Temporal range: Eocene

Extinct species of shark

Abdounia recticona is an extinct species of requiem shark from the Eocene epoch. It is known from isolated teeth, and can be found Europe and North America.
