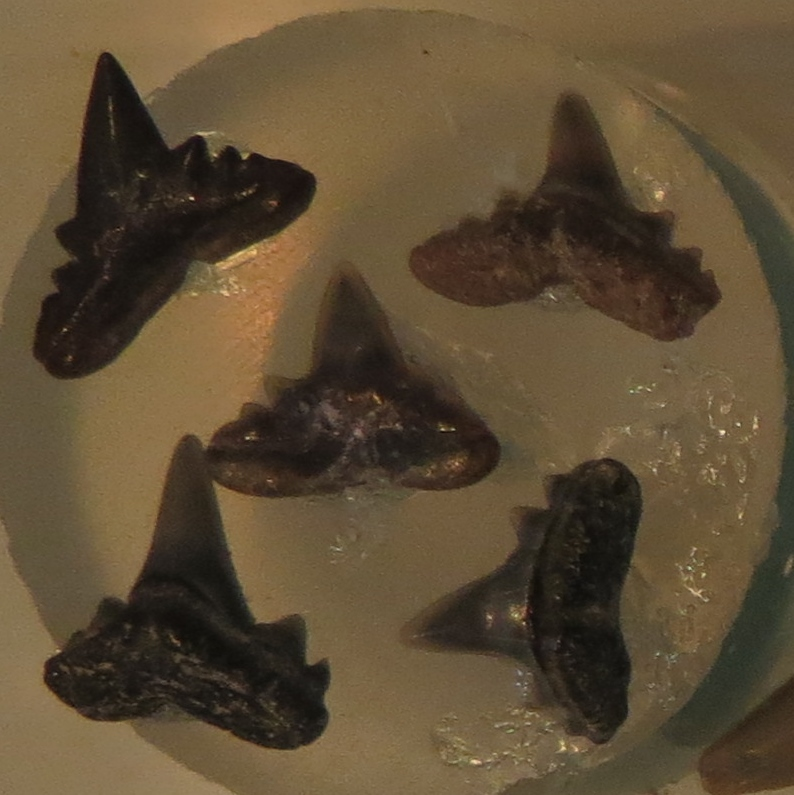
- Abdounia beaugei

Scientific classification
- Kingdom: Animalia
- Phylum: Chordata
- Class: Chondrichthyes
- Subclass: Elasmobranchii
- Division: Selachii
- Order: Carcharhiniformes
- Family: Carcharhinidae
- Genus: †Abdounia; Cappetta, 1980

= Abdounia =

Abdounia Temporal range: Danian-Rupelian, 66–27.8 Ma

Extinct requiem shark

Abdounia is an extinct genus of requiem shark which lived during the Paleogene period, and is mainly known from isolated teeth. Abdounia is one of the earliest requiem shark genera, and attained widespread success in North America, Europe, and Africa.

== Locations ==
Fossil Abdounia teeth are known from the Paleogene of Morocco, France, Belgium, Russia, and the United States (North Carolina, Georgia, Alabama, and Virginia). In the lower Nanjemoy Formation of Virginia, they are the most common fossil shark tooth. By the end of the Oligocene Epoch the genus is severely reduced, probably due to competition with other Carcharhiniformes like Carcharhinus.

== Species ==
The following are species currently attributed to this genus. Note this may be an under-representation of actual diversity, as living relatives have extremely similar teeth across species.

- Abdounia africana (Danian-Thanetian)
- Abdounia beaugei (Paleocene-Eocene)
- Abdounia belselensis (Rupelian)
- Abdounia biauriculata (Ypresian)
- Abdounia enniskelleni (Eocene)
- Abdounia furimskyi (upper Eocene-Rupelian)
- Abdounia lapierrei (Eocene)
- Abdounia lata (Priabonian)
- Abdounia minutissima (Eocene)
- Abdounia recticona (Eocene)
- Abdounia vassilyevae (Priabonian)
