= Pamunkey Group =

Geologic stratigraphic unit in Virginia, United States

- Stratigraphic range: Paleogene
- Type: Group
- Sub-units: Aquia Formation, Nanjemoy Formation

Location
- Region: Virginia
- Country: United States

The Pamunkey Group is a geologic group in Virginia, United States. It preserves fossils dating back to the Paleogene period.

== See also ==
- List of fossiliferous stratigraphic units in Virginia
- Paleontology in Virginia
