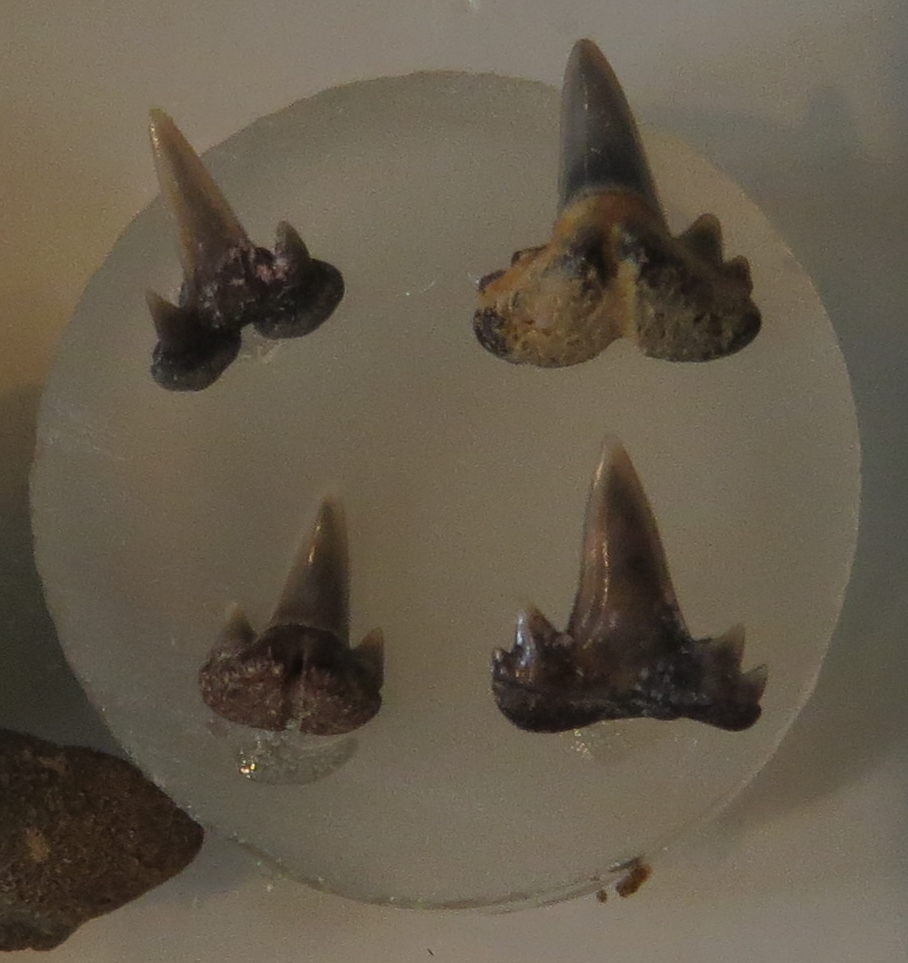

Scientific classification
- Kingdom: Animalia
- Phylum: Chordata
- Class: Chondrichthyes
- Subclass: Elasmobranchii
- Division: Selachii
- Order: Carcharhiniformes
- Family: Carcharhinidae
- Genus: †Abdounia
- Species: †A. minutissima

Binomial name
- †Abdounia minutissima Winkler, 1873

= Abdounia minutissima =

Abdounia minutissima Temporal range: Eocene

Genus of Requiem Shark

Abdounia minutissima is an extinct species of requiem shark from the Eocene Epoch. It is known from isolated teeth in England, Belgium and possibly the Chesapeake Bay region of the eastern United States.
