= Scombramphodon =

Scombramphodon Temporal range: Early- Middle Eocene

Scientific classification
- Kingdom: Animalia
- Phylum: Chordata
- Class: Actinopterygii
- Division: Teleostei
- Order: Perciformes
- Genus: †Scombramphodon; Woodward, 1901

Extinct genus of fishes

Scombramphodon is an extinct genus of prehistoric bony fish that lived from the early to middle Eocene.
