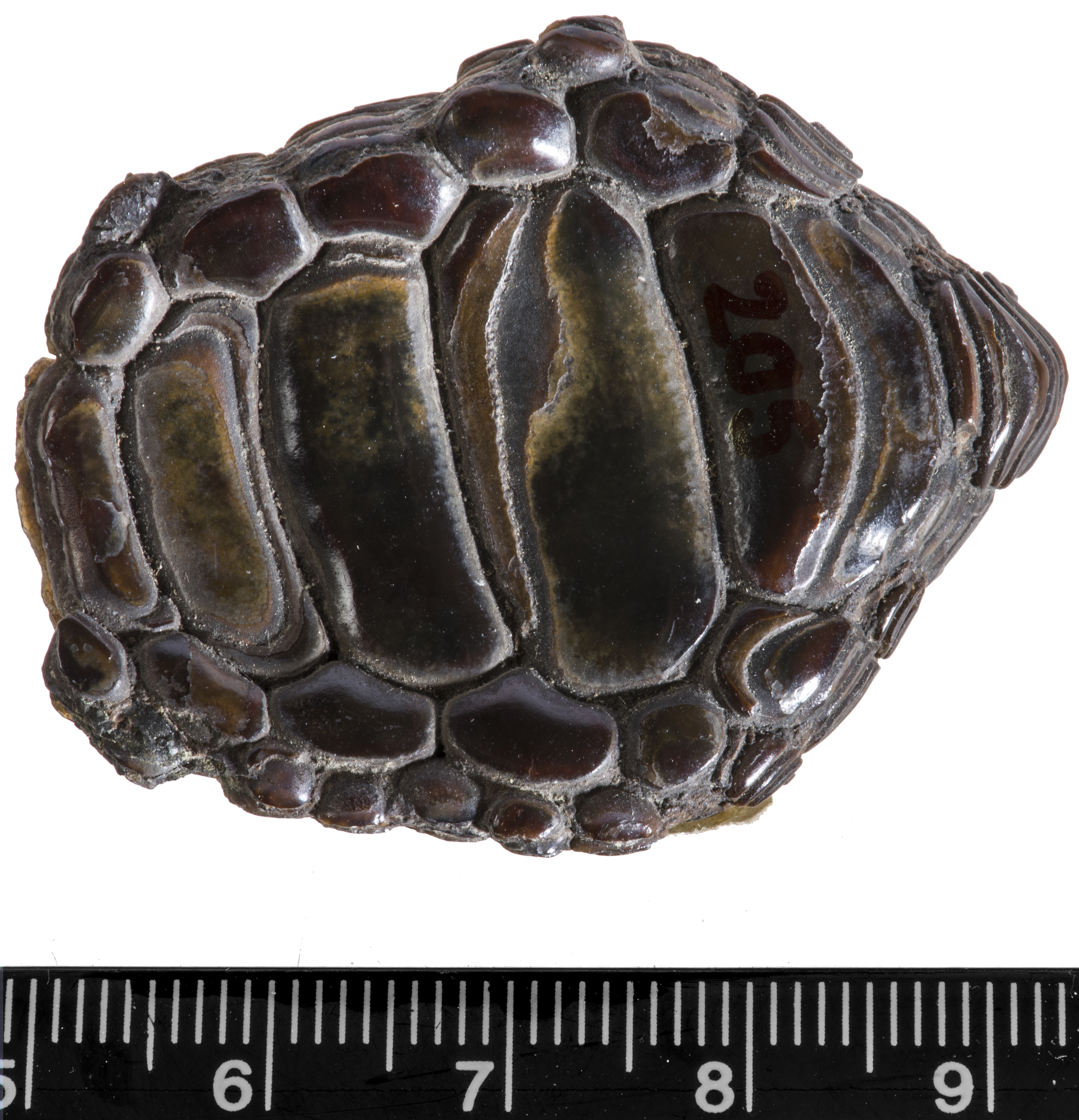
- Fossil vomer

Scientific classification
- Kingdom: Animalia
- Phylum: Chordata
- Class: Actinopterygii
- Order: Albuliformes
- Family: †Phyllodontidae
- Genus: †Phyllodus

Species
- Phyllodus bucklandi; Phyllodus curvidens; Phyllodus elegans; Phyllodus hipparionyx; Phyllodus marginalis; Phyllodus paulkatoi; Phyllodus planus; Phyllodus polyodus; Phyllodus toliapicus

= Phyllodus =

Phyllodus Temporal range: 68–50 Ma

Extinct genus of fishes

Phyllodus is an extinct genus of bony fish from the Maastrichtian to Middle Miocene. Fossils of the genus have been found in the Maastrichtian to Danian Hell Creek Formation, the Eocene London Clay, the Early eocene Nanjemoy formation. and the Paleocene of South Carolina.

== Classification ==
It was assigned to Actinopteri by Cope (1875); to Phyllodontinae by Estes and Hiatt (1978); to Labridae by Hay (1902), Leriche (1942), Rapp (1946) and Thurmond and Jones (1981); to Anguilliformes by Sepkoski (2002); and to Phyllodontidae by Casier (1946), Casier (1966), Bryant (1989), Weems (1998), Weems (1999) and Ebersole et al. (2019).

== See also ==
- List of prehistoric bony fish genera
