= Coupatezia =

Coupatezia Temporal range: Maastrichtian-Lutetian

Scientific classification
- Kingdom: Animalia
- Phylum: Chordata
- Class: Chondrichthyes
- Subclass: Elasmobranchii
- Order: Myliobatiformes
- Family: Dasyatidae
- Genus: †Coupatezia; Cappetta 1982

Extinct genus of cartilaginous fishes

Coupatezia is a prehistoric genus of ray in the family Dasyatidae whose fossils are found in strata dating from the Maastrichtian stage until the last species' extinction during the Middle Eocene. These rays were found shallow seas in Europe, Africa and the eastern United States.

== Classification ==
=== Species ===
- Coupatezia fallax
- Coupatezia trempina (Maastrichtian "Kemp Clay" stratum of Texas)
- Coupatezia turneri
- Coupatezia woutersi (Lutetian Virginia)

== See also ==
- Flora and fauna of the Maastrichtian stage
- List of prehistoric cartilaginous fish (Chondrichthyes)
