= Brightseat Formation =

Geologic formation in Maryland, United States

The Brightseat Formation is an exposure of marine sedimentary rock beds of Upper Cretaceous/Lower Paleocene age (65 MY to 55.5 MY), in Landover, Maryland. The exposure is located at Brightseat Road between Sheriff and Landover Roads. The site is currently owned by the Maryland-National Capital Park and Planning Commission. It was given its name by R.R. Bennett and G.G. Collins in 1952.

According to the Maryland Geologic Survey, the exposure consists of "Gray to greenish-gray, micaceous, argillaceous, sparsely glauconitic, fine- to coarse-grained sand, locally indurated calcareous beds; phosphatic pebbles; thickness 0 to 20 feet."

== Research ==
Available research on the flora and fauna of the Brightseat Formation is decades-old. In 1968, thirty-five species of minute crustaceans, ostracodes, mostly cytheraceans, were found at outcrops of the Brightseat Formation, including 13 new species. The presence of otoliths, calcareous secretions that accumulate within the auditory chambers of bony fish, indicate the presence of fish fauna in the formation. The Brightseat Formation has also yielded three taxa of sea turtles: Taphrosphys sulfates (Leidy), Agomphus sp., and Osteopygis emarginatus Cope.
